= Just Rens =

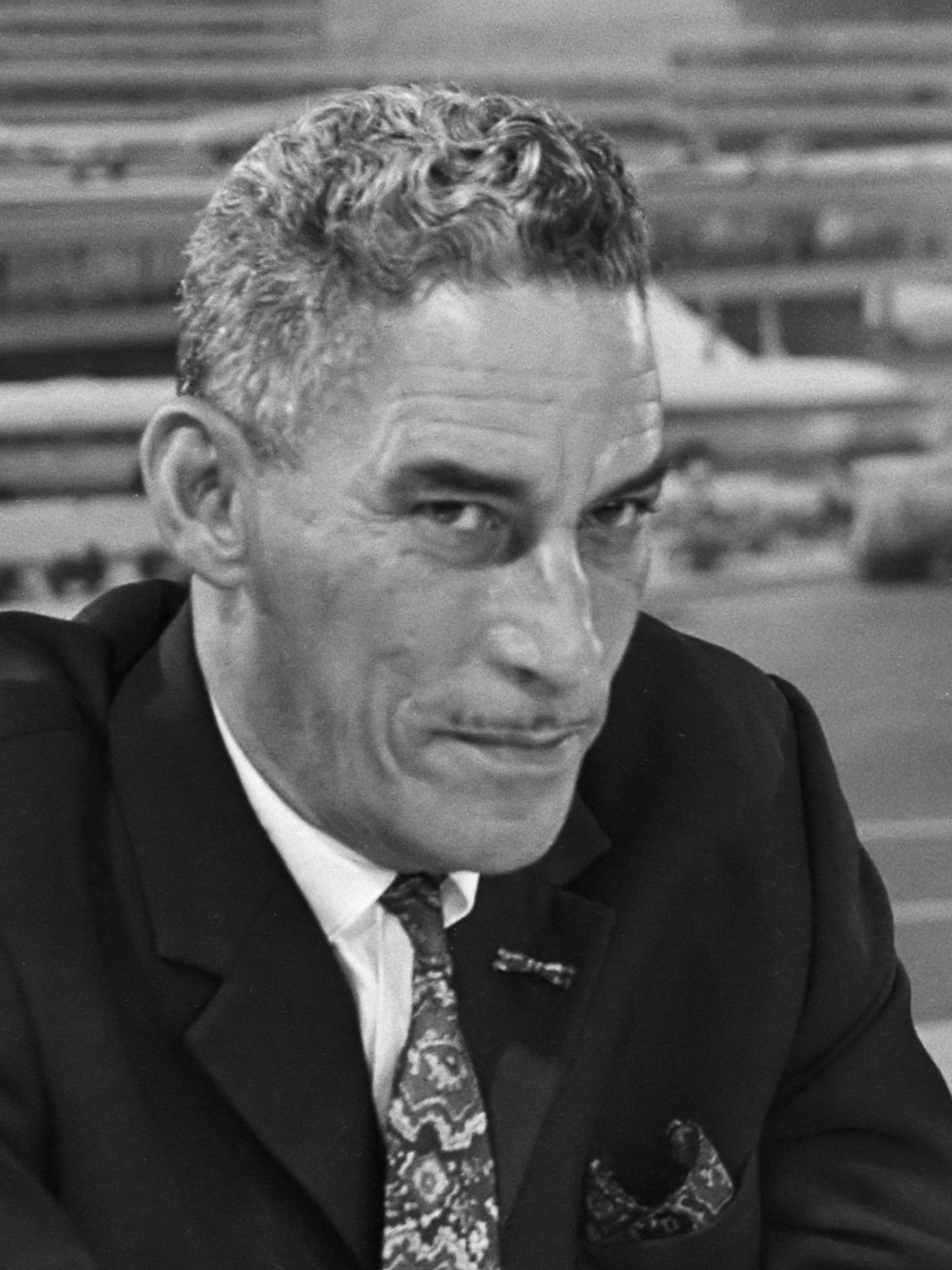
- Rens in 1971

Personal details
- Born: 12 April 1916 Paramaribo, Suriname
- Died: 16 February 1981 (aged 64) Paramaribo, Suriname
- Party: National Party of Suriname; Progressive National Party
- Occupation: Politician

Just Rens (12 April 1916 – 16 February 1981) was a Surinamese politician. He was a member of the Estates of Suriname and served as a government minister. Originally a member of the National Party of Suriname (NPS), he left the party following a political conflict and founded the Progressive National Party (PNP) in 1967.

== Political career ==
Rens was elected to the Estates of Suriname as a member of the National Party of Suriname (NPS). He was among the NPS candidates elected in the 1951 Surinamese general election and was again elected in the 1958 Surinamese general election.

Following the 1963 Surinamese general election, Rens became Minister of Development in the government led by Johan Adolf Pengel. He succeeded Frank Essed, who had held the development portfolio from 1958 to 1963.

Rens eventually came into conflict with the leadership of the NPS. In January 1967 he was dismissed from his ministerial position. Later that month, he founded the Progressive National Party (PNP), which contested the 1967 Surinamese general election.

The new party won three seats in the Estates. Rens was elected alongside Jules Sedney and Aksel Quintus Bosz.

In the 1969 Surinamese general election, the PNP participated as part of an electoral alliance with several other parties. Following the election, the PNP joined a coalition with the VHP bloc, and PNP politician Jules Sedney became Prime Minister of Suriname.

Rens subsequently served as Minister of Economic Affairs. In this capacity he was involved in efforts to develop the Surinamese airline SLM and strengthen its position in international aviation.

The PNP lost its parliamentary representation in the 1973 Surinamese general election, receiving approximately 3.2% of the vote and failing to win a seat.

== Death ==
Rens died unexpectedly in Paramaribo on 16 February 1981, aged 64.

== Legacy ==
A residential development in the Kwatta area of Paramaribo became known as the Rens Project, named after Rens.
