= 1963 Surinamese general election =

← 1958	March 1963	1967 →
- 36 seats in the Estates of Suriname; 19 seats needed for a majority
Party	Leader	Seats	+/–
NPS	Johan Pengel	14	+5
VHP	Jagernath Lachmon	8	+4
Action Front		6	+4
KTPI	Iding Soemita	4	+2
PSV		4	0
This lists parties that won seats. See the complete results below.
Prime Minister before	Prime Minister after
S.D. Emanuels; NPS	Johan Pengel; NPS

General elections were held in Suriname in March 1963. The result was a victory for the National Party of Suriname, which won 14 of the 36 seats.

== Results ==
Party	Seats	+/–
National Party of Suriname	14	+5
United Hindustani Party	8	+4
Action Front (AG–SDP–NOP–AFD)	6	+4
Party for National Unity and Solidarity	4	+2
Progressive Surinamese People's Party	4	0
Core Group	0	New
Farming Party	0	New
Nationalist Republican Party	0	New
United Indian Party	0	New
Total	36	+15
Source: Nohlen, Gallé

=== Elected members ===
Member	Party
Jnan Hansdev Adhin	United Hindustani Party
Henck Arron	National Party of Suriname
F.M. Boldewijn	National Party of Suriname
Chris Calor	National Party of Suriname
Paul Chandi Shaw	Action Front (Action Group)
David George Findlay	Action Front (Surinamese Democratic Party)
Emile de la Fuente	National Party of Suriname
Olton van Genderen	National Party of Suriname
Leo Guda	Progressive Surinamese People's Party
Henk Heidweiller	Progressive Surinamese People's Party
Harry Hirasing	Action Front (Surinamese Democratic Party)
W. Kramaredja	Party for National Unity and Solidarity
Jagernath Lachmon	United Hindustani Party
Bhagwansingh Laigsingh	United Hindustani Party
Wilfred Liefde	National Party of Suriname
Walter Lim A Po	National Party of Suriname
André Morgenstond	National Party of Suriname
E.N. Morman	National Party of Suriname
Alwin Mungra	United Hindustani Party
Radjnarain Nannan Panday	United Hindustani Party
Coen Ooft	Progressive Surinamese People's Party
Leo Naurang Pahladsingh	Action Front (Action Group)
A.H. Pawiroredjo	Party for National Unity and Solidarity
Chris Pinas	National Party of Suriname
R. Pocorni	National Party of Suriname
Dewnarain Poetoe	Action Front (Nickerie Independent Party)
Isabella Richaards	National Party of Suriname
Th.N. Saridjo	Party for National Unity and Solidarity
D. Sathoe	United Hindustani Party
Hemradj Shriemisier	United Hindustani Party
Iding Soemita	Party for National Unity and Solidarity
Hendrik Soemodihardjo	Party for National Unity and Solidarity
Jules Sof	United Hindustani Party
M.G. Sumter	Action Front (Action Front Dihaat)
Emile Wijntuin	Progressive Surinamese People's Party
Floris Zwakke	National Party of Suriname
