= Frank Essed =

Surinam politician and forestry academics

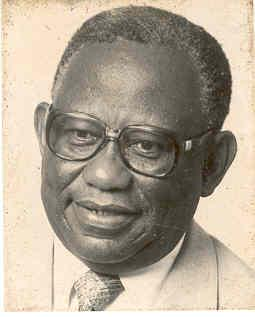

Minister of Development
- In office 1958–1963
- Preceded by: position established
- Succeeded by: Just Rens
- In office 1969–1973
- Preceded by: Arthur Johan May
- Succeeded by: Michael Cambridge

Personal details
- Born: Franklin Edgar Essed; 21 April 1919 Paramaribo, Surinam
- Died: 22 December 1988 (aged 69) Paramaribo, Suriname
- Party: National Party of Suriname (–1963); Progressive National Party (1967–)
- Occupation: politician, forest scientist

Franklin Edgar Essed (21 April 1919 – 22 December 1988) was a Surinamese forest scientist and politician. He served as Minister of Development from 1958 until 1963, and 1969 until 1973. Essed initiated Operation Grasshopper which build airstrips in the interior to map natural resources.

== Biography ==
Essed was born on 21 April 1919 in Paramaribo. He went to high school, and started to work as a geodist. In 1949, he received the opportunity to study at Wageningen University in the Netherlands. He graduated in forestry in 1955, and received his doctorate in 1957.

In 1957, Essed returned to Suriname, and started to work for Dienst 's Lands Bosbeheer, the forestry agency of Suriname. He also became a member of the National Party of Suriname (NPS), and in 1958, he was elected to the Estates of Suriname with the most votes for a single candidate. He first served as Minister without Portfolio for 14 days, before being appointed to the newly formed Ministry of Development.

In 1959, Essed initiated Operation Grasshopper, a plan to build little airstrips in the interior of Suriname to map the natural resources. The same year, he commissioned Trefossa to rewrite the national anthem. He also initiated changing the electoral system from a district system into a mixed system. An internal conflict with Jopie Pengel led to Essed resigning from the NPS, and not participating in the 1963 elections

Essed was appointed president of the planning agency of Suriname, and in 1967 joined the Progressive National Party, In 1969, he was re-elected to the Estates of Suriname, and again served as Minister of Development until 1973. In 1975, Essed became the Surinamese chairperson of the Netherlands-Suriname Development Committee which coordinated the development aid of the now independent Suriname. He was one of the proponents of the West Suriname Plan which aimed to develop the bauxite in the Bakhuis Mountains.

In 1980, Desi Bouterse committed a coup d'état resulting in the cancellation of the West Suriname Plan. In April 1980, Essed was arrested. Even though he was accused corruption, he was never charged or went to trial. He was released on 21 February 1981 and placed under house arrest. In 1987, Essed announced his candidacy for President of Suriname, however Ramsewak Shankar was elected in 1988.

On 22 December 1988, Essed attended a Christmas party organised by Henck Arron. He left the party, and was hit by a car while crossing the street. Essed died on the way to the hospital, at the age of 69.

== Legacy ==
Flora Stadion was renamed Dr. Ir. Franklin Essed Stadion in his honour. In 1995, a bust was revealed in front of the Ministry of Land and Forest Management, the current name of the Ministry of Development.
