= 1958 Surinamese general election =

- 25 June 1958
- 21 seats in the Estates of Suriname; 11 seats needed for a majority
Party	Leader	Seats	+/–
NPS	S.D. Emanuels	9	+7
VHP	Jagernath Lachmon	4	−2
PSV		4	+1
KTPI	Iding Soemita	2	0
NOP		2	New
This lists parties that won seats. See the complete results below.
Prime Minister before	Prime Minister after
Johan Ferrier; SDP	S.D. Emanuels; NPS

General elections were held in Suriname on 25 June 1958. The result was a victory for the National Party of Suriname, which won nine of the 21 seats.

== Results ==
Party	Seats	+/–
National Party of Suriname	9	+7
United Hindustani Party	4	–2
Progressive Surinamese People's Party	4	+1
Party for National Unity and Solidarity	2	0
Nickerie Independent Party	2	New
Surinamese Democratic Party	0	–5
Surinamese People's Party	0	New
Total	21	0
Source: Nohlen, Gallé

=== Elected members ===
National Party of Suriname (NPS)

- Emile Ensberg
- Frank Essed
- Emile de la Fuente
- Johan Kraag
- Walter Lim A Po
- Johan Adolf Pengel
- Emanuel Ferdinand Pierau
- Just Rens
- Jules Sof

United Hindustani Party (VHP)

- Jagernath Lachmon
- Harry Mungra
- Harry Radhakishun
- Mohamed Islam Ramdjan (Moslimblok)

Progressive Surinamese People's Party (PSV)

- Henk Heidweiller
- Emile Wijntuin
- Leo Guda
- Paul van Philips

Party for National Unity and Solidarity (KTPI)

- Iding Soemita
- S. Soedardjo

Nickerie Independent Party

- Dewnarain Poetoe
- Johan Somaroe Kolhoe

==== Replacements ====
- Van Philips (PSV) became in 1958 minister and was succeeded by Coen Ooft.
- Essed and Ensberg (both NPS) also became minister and were succeeded by André Morgenstond and Olton van Genderen
- Pierau died in 1962
