= 1969 Surinamese general election =

- 24 October 1969
- 39 seats in the Estates; 20 seats needed for a majority
Party	Leader	Vote %	Seats	+/–
VHP Bloc	Jagernath Lachmon	37.23	19	+2
NPS	Johan Adolf Pengel	27.19	11	−6
PNP Bloc	Jules Sedney	23.37	8	+5
PNR	Eddy Bruma	7.81	1	+1
This lists parties that won seats. See the complete results below.
Prime Minister before	Prime Minister after
Arthur Johan May; Independent	Jules Sedney; PNP

General elections were held in Suriname on 24 October 1969. The result was a victory for the VHP bloc (an alliance of the VHP, the Indonesian People's Party and the Action Group), which won 19 of the 39 seats.

== Results ==
Party	Votes	%	Seats	+/–
VHP Bloc (VHP–SRI–AG)	75,963	37.23	19	+2
National Party of Suriname	55,482	27.19	11	–6
PNP Bloc (PNP–KTPI–PSV–PBP)	47,690	23.37	8	+5
Nationalist Republican Party	15,943	7.81	1	+1
Surinamese Democratic Party	3,152	1.54	0	–2
Surinamese Hindu Party	2,154	1.06	0	New
Other parties	3,657	1.79	0	–
Total	204,041	100.00	39	0
Source: Nohlen
