= 1973 Surinamese general election =

- 19 November 1973
- 39 seats in the Estates; 20 seats needed for a majority
Party	Leader	Vote %	Seats	+/–
NPK	Henck Arron	50.28	22	
VHP Bloc	Jagernath Lachmon	39.06	17	−2
This lists parties that won seats. See the complete results below.
Prime Minister before	Prime Minister after
Jules Sedney; PNP	Henck Arron; NPS

General elections were held in Suriname on 19 November 1973. The result was a victory for the National Party Combination (an alliance of the National Party of Suriname, the Nationalist Republican Party, the Party for National Unity and Solidarity and the Suriname Progressive People's Party), which won 22 of the 39 seats.

== Results ==
Party	Votes	%	Seats	+/–
National Party Combination (NPS–PNR–KTPI–PSV)	61,700	50.28	22	–
VHP Bloc (VHP–SRI–PBP)	47,931	39.06	17	–2
Progressive National Party	3,908	3.18	0	–
Bush Negro Unity Party	3,198	2.61	0	New
Hindustani Political Party	3,121	2.54	0	New
United People's Party–Surinamese Women's Front	1,215	0.99	0	New
Democratic People's Front	676	0.55	0	New
Action Group	628	0.51	0	–
Democratic Union of Suriname	334	0.27	0	New
Total	122,711	100.00	39	0
Registered voters/turnout	161,400	–		
Source: Nohlen
