= Sheik Mohamed Jamaludin =

Sheik Mohamed Jamaludin (Paramaribo, 14 July 1906 – 22 April 1961) was a businessman, entrepreneur, estate member/politician and chairman of 2 religious organisations.

Despite being born in Suriname, at the census of 1921 he was considered to be a British citizen. He became a member of the Estates of Surinam in 1949. He was a member of the board and longtime chairman of both the 'Surinaamse Islamitische Vereniging' (SIV) and the in 1947 founded 'Moeslim Partij' (Muslim Party). That party merged early 1949 into the Verenigde Hindostaanse Partij (VHP). At the 1949 Surinamese general election he was elected as VHP-candidate. His brother-in-law Ashruf Karamat Ali, a KTPI-candidate, was also elected to become a member of the Estates of Suriname. Because they were brothers-in-law only one could be admitted. Karamat Ali was initially not sworn in because he had fewer votes then Jamaludin. Out of the six VHP members of the Estates of Suriname only two were Muslim: S.M. Jamaludin en H.W. Mohamed Radja. In 1950 both came in conflict with the VHP and started working together with the NPS. At the snap election in 1951 Jamaludin was not reelected. He stepped out of politics directly in 1951 and continued his business career. He had a printing factory, Match factory, several other factories and joint-venture companies. In 1961 he died at the age of 54. He had 3 sons; drs.Izaak Jamaludin, general doctor later also longtime chairman of the SIV and SIO (Surinaamse islamitische Organisatie); Dr.Abraham Jamaludin, Gynaecologist-obstetric, in Holland and Surinam and also founder of the SIO and drs.Rahim Jamaludin, apotheker. Son of drs.Izaak Jamaludin, Drs.Sharif Mohamed Jamaludin, general doctor was given the second name Mohamed after him. Third son of Dr. Abraham Jamaludin, drs.Sheikh-Mirza Jamaludin, entrepreneur, businessman and dentist-specialist in Hilversum Holland is named after him as the third S.M.Jamaludin and given the first name Sheikh after him.
