= Harry Francois Sewberath Misser =

Surinamese politician

Harry Francois Sewberath Misser (15 February 1895 – 16 August 1961) was a Surinamese civil servant and politician of the VHP.

He was born in Suriname as son of British Indian immigrants and Rammaneruth was his given name. In 1925 he officially chose to be called Harry Francois Sewberath Misser. He was working as district clerk and eventually he became the district secretary of Saramacca. Besides that he was also a politician. At the 1951 Surinamese general election Sewberath Misser was elected in the Saramacca District to become a member of the Estates of Suriname. At the election in 1955 he was reelected and the NPS lost 11 of their 13 seats. VHP-leader Jagernath Lachmon offered two of the elected VHP members would give up their place in parliament in favour of NPS members. Sewberath Misser did so and as planned Johan Adolf Pengel was elected in the resulting by-election. In 1961 Sewberath Misser died at the age of 66.
