= 1955 Surinamese general election =

- 29 March 1955
- 21 seats in the Estates of Suriname; 11 seats needed for a majority
Party	Leader	Seats	+/–
EF	Johan Ferrier	11	New
VHP	Jagernath Lachmon	6	0
NPS	Eugene Doelwijt	2	−11
KTPI	Iding Soemita	2	0
This lists parties that won seats. See the complete results below.
Prime Minister before	Prime Minister after
Archibald Currie; NPS	Johan Ferrier; SDP

General elections were held in Suriname on 29 March 1955. The result was a victory for the Unity Front, which won 11 of the 21 seats.

== Results ==
Party	Seats	+/–
Unity Front (SDP–PSV–PS)	11	New
United Hindustani Party	6	0
National Party of Suriname	2	–11
Party for National Unity and Solidarity	2	0
Christian-Social Party	0	0
Congress Party	0	0
Suriname Labour Party	0	New
Total	21	0
Source: Nohlen

=== Elected members ===
Unity Front

- Stuart Harry Axwijk (SDP)
- Clemens Ramkisoen Biswamitre (PSV)
- E.R. Braaf (SDP)
- Rudolf Bernhard William Comvalius (SDP)
- J.A. Emanuels (PSV)
- J.J. Emanuelson (PS)
- David George Findlay (SDP)
- George Kort (PS)
- Henny Lamur (PS)
- Henk van Ommeren (SDP)
- J.A. Wessels (PSV)

VHP

- Jagernath Lachmon
- Harry Radhakishun
- Harry Francois Sewberath Misser
- Soekdew Mungra
- Khemradj Kanhai
- Ramkisoen Dewdat Oedayrajsing Varma

NPS

- Emanuel Ferdinand Pierau
- Johan Kraag

KTPI

- Ashruf Karamat Ali
- Iding Soemita
