= List of prime ministers of Suriname =

Prime Minister of Suriname
- Minister-president van Suriname
- Standard of the prime minister of Suriname (1975–1988)

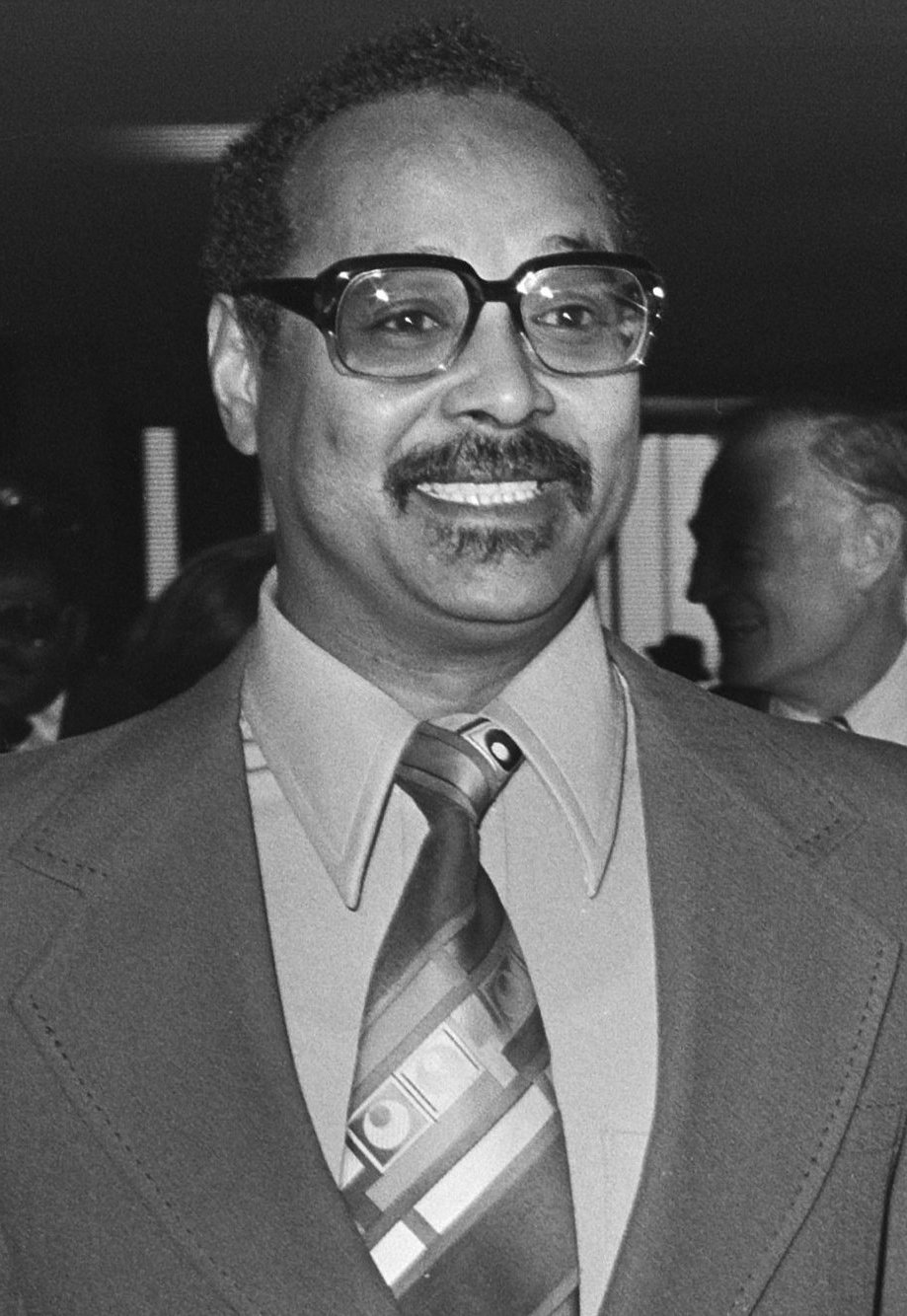
- Longest serving officeholder Henck Arron; 24 December 1973 – 25 February 1980
- Status: Head of government
- Member of: Cabinet of Suriname
- Seat: Paramaribo
- Appointer: Governor of Suriname (1949–1975) President of Suriname (1975–1988)
- Formation: 3 June 1949; 77 years ago
- First holder: Julius Caesar de Miranda
- Final holder: Jules Wijdenbosch
- Abolished: 26 January 1988; 38 years ago
- Succession: Vice President of Suriname
- Deputy: Deputy Prime Minister of Suriname

This article lists the prime ministers of Suriname from 1949 to 1988. In 1988 the position of Prime Minister of Suriname was abolished and replaced by a vice president, who chairs the Council of Ministers ex officio.

== List of prime ministers ==
Political parties

Progressive Surinamese People's Party (PSV)
National Party of Suriname (NPS)
Surinamese Democratic Party (SDP)
Progressive National Party (PNP)
Nationalist Republican Party (PNR)
Progressive Workers' and Farmers' Union (PALU)
Progressive Reform Party (VHP)
February 25th Movement (VFB)
Independent

Status

Denotes Acting Prime Minister

=== Part of the Netherlands (–1975) ===
No.	Portrait	Name (Birth–Death)	Term of office			Political party	Elected	Monarch(s)	Ref.
No.	Portrait	Name (Birth–Death)	Took office	Left office	Time in office	Political party	Elected	Monarch(s)	Ref.
Surinam (colony of the Dutch Empire)
1		Julius Caesar de Miranda (1906–1956)	3 June 1949	2 April 1951	1 year, 303 days	PSV	1949	Juliana	
–		Jacques Drielsma (1886–1974) acting	5 April 1951	4 June 1951	60 days	Independent	—	Juliana	
2		Jan Buiskool (1899–1960)	4 June 1951	6 September 1952	1 year, 94 days	Independent	1951	Juliana	
3		Adriaan Alberga (1887–1952)	6 September 1952	4 December 1952	89 days	Independent	—	Juliana	
–		Archibald Currie (1888–1986)	4 December 1952	20 August 1954	1 year, 259 days	NPS	—	Juliana	
4		Archibald Currie (1888–1986)	20 August 1954	15 December 1954	117 days	NPS	—	Juliana	
Suriname (constituent country of the Kingdom of the Netherlands)
4		Archibald Currie (1888–1986)	15 December 1954	16 April 1955	122 days	NPS	—	Juliana	
5		Johan Ferrier (1910–2010)	16 April 1955	25 June 1958	3 years, 70 days	SDP	1955	Juliana	
6		Severinus Desiré Emanuels (1910–1981)	25 June 1958	30 June 1963	5 years, 5 days	NPS	1958	Juliana	
7		Johan Adolf Pengel (1916–1970)	30 June 1963	5 March 1969	5 years, 248 days	NPS	1963	Juliana	
7		Johan Adolf Pengel (1916–1970)	30 June 1963	5 March 1969	5 years, 248 days	NPS	1967	Juliana	
–		Arthur Johan May (1903–1979) acting	5 March 1969	20 November 1969	260 days	Independent	—	Juliana	
8		Jules Sedney (1922–2020)	20 November 1969	24 December 1973	4 years, 34 days	PNP	1969	Juliana	
9		Henck Arron (1936–2000)	24 December 1973	25 November 1975	1 year, 336 days	NPS	1973	Juliana	

=== Independence (1975–) ===
No.	Portrait	Name (Birth–Death)	Term of office			Political party	Elected	Cabinet(s)	President(s)	Ref.
No.	Portrait	Name (Birth–Death)	Took office	Left office	Time in office	Political party	Elected	Cabinet(s)	President(s)	Ref.
Republic of Suriname
9		Henck Arron (1936–2000)	25 November 1975	25 February 1980 (Note: Deposed in the Sergeants' Coup.)	4 years, 92 days	NPS	—	Arron I	Johan Ferrier (NPS)	
9		Henck Arron (1936–2000)	25 November 1975	25 February 1980	4 years, 92 days	NPS	1977	Arron II	Johan Ferrier (NPS)	
10		Henk Chin A Sen (1934–1999)	15 March 1980	4 February 1982 (Note: Dismissed by Bouterse.)	1 year, 326 days	PNR	—	Chin A Sen I	Johan Ferrier (NPS)	
10		Henk Chin A Sen (1934–1999)	15 March 1980	4 February 1982	1 year, 326 days	PNR	—	Chin A Sen II	Himself (Note: From 15 August 1980.)	
11		Henry Neijhorst (born 1940)	31 March 1982	9 December 1982 (Note: Resigned following the December murders.)	253 days	Independent	—	Neijhorst	Fred Ramdat Misier (Independent)	
12		Errol Alibux (born 1948)	26 February 1983	8 January 1984 (Note: Dismissed by Bouterse.)	316 days	PALU	—	Alibux	Fred Ramdat Misier (Independent)	
13		Wim Udenhout (1937–2023)	3 February 1984	17 July 1986	2 years, 164 days	Independent	—	Udenhout I	Fred Ramdat Misier (Independent)	
13		Wim Udenhout (1937–2023)	3 February 1984	17 July 1986	2 years, 164 days	Independent	—	Udenhout II	Fred Ramdat Misier (Independent)	
14		Pretaap Radhakishun (1934–2001)	17 July 1986	7 April 1987	264 days	VHP	—	Radhakishun	Fred Ramdat Misier (Independent)	
15		Jules Wijdenbosch (1941–2025)	7 April 1987	26 January 1988	294 days	VFB	—	Wijdenbosch I	Fred Ramdat Misier (Independent)	

== See also ==
- Politics of Suriname
- List of deputy prime ministers of Suriname
- List of colonial governors of Suriname
- President of Suriname
- First Lady of Suriname
- Vice President of Suriname
