= Mohamed Islam Ramdjan =

Mohamed Islam Ramdjan (23 June 1916 – 14 October 1973) was a Surinamese wrestler and politician.

In his younger years he was active as a wrestler, following his father. He started a slaughterhouse in Paramaribo in 1943. From the 1930s he was about 40 years the chairman of the Suriname Muslim Association and in 1958 he was elected to the Estates of Suriname for the VHP in the Saramacca district. In the elections held five years later, he was without success a candidate of the Muslim Party Suriname in the Para district. After the 1967 elections Islam Ramdjan entered parliament for the NPS and was re-elected two years later. In early 1972 he went on a pilgrimage to Mecca. Shortly before the 1973 elections, Islam Ramdjan died at the age of 57.
