= 1977 Surinamese general election =

- 31 October 1977
- 39 seats in Parliament; 20 seats needed for a majority
Party	Leader	Vote %	Seats	+/–
NPS–HPP–KTPI–PSV	Henck Arron	45.41	22	0
VHP–VVP–NPD–SPS–PL	Jagernath Lachmon	44.12	17	0
This lists parties that won seats. See the complete results below.
Prime Minister before	Prime Minister after
Henck Arron; NPS	Henck Arron; NPS

General elections were held in Suriname on 31 October 1977, the first after independence on 11/25/1975. The result was a victory for the National Party Combination (an alliance of the National Party of Suriname, the Renewed Progressive Party, the Party for National Unity and Solidarity and the Suriname Progressive People's Party), which won 22 of the 39 seats.

== Results ==
Party	Votes	%	Seats	+/–
National Party Combination (NPS–HPP–KTPI–PSV)	56,176	45.41	22	0
United Democratic Party (VHP–VVP–NPD–SPS–PL)	54,583	44.12	17	0
Nationalist Republican Party	5,871	4.75	0	–
People's Party	4,534	3.66	0	New
Progressive Workers' and Farmers' Union	1,006	0.81	0	New
Democratic People's Front (DVF–VIP–PLP–BEP–PBP)	964	0.78	0	0
Progressive Muslim Party	361	0.29	0	New
Progressive National Party	225	0.18	0	0
Total	123,720	100.00	39	0
Registered voters/turnout	159,082	–		
Source: Nohlen
