= Surinamese Democratic Party =

Surinamese Democratic Party Surinaamse Democratische Partij
- Founder: David George Findlay
- Founded: 1955
- Dissolved: 1969
- Split from: National Party of Suriname
- Ideology: Social democracy

The Surinamese Democratic Party (Dutch: Surinaamse Democratische Partij, SDP) was a political party in Suriname.

The party was founded in 1955 by David George Findlay, owner and chief editor of the newspaper De West and former member of the parliament on behalf of the National Party of Suriname (NPS). The main cause of the split was that NPS member Johan Pengel had made an election agreement with the United Hindustani Party (VHP). The NPS support base consisted mainly of Creoles, while the VHP was the main Indo-Surinamese party.

In the 1955 Surinamese general election, the SDP participated as part of the Eenheidsfront ("Unity Front"). The Unity Front won 13 of the 21 seats in the parliament, while VHP and NPS won 6 and 2 seats respectively. Five SDP politicians were elected. Party member Johan Ferrier served as both prime minister and interior minister for a three-year period from 1955 until 1958. In the 1958 elections, the Unity Front (now consisting of SDP, SVP and PS) did not win a single seat, while the NPS made a strong comeback with 9 seats.

In the 1963 elections, Findlay was re-elected and together with party member H.D. Hirasing he entered the parliament. From 1967 to 1969, Findlay served as member of the parliament with party member C.R. Biswamitre. In the 1969 elections, the SDP received 1.5% of the votes and lost both seats. Afterwards, Findlay remained active at newspaper De West, but the SDP would not return to parliament.
