= Jules Sedney =

Surinamese politician (1922–2020)

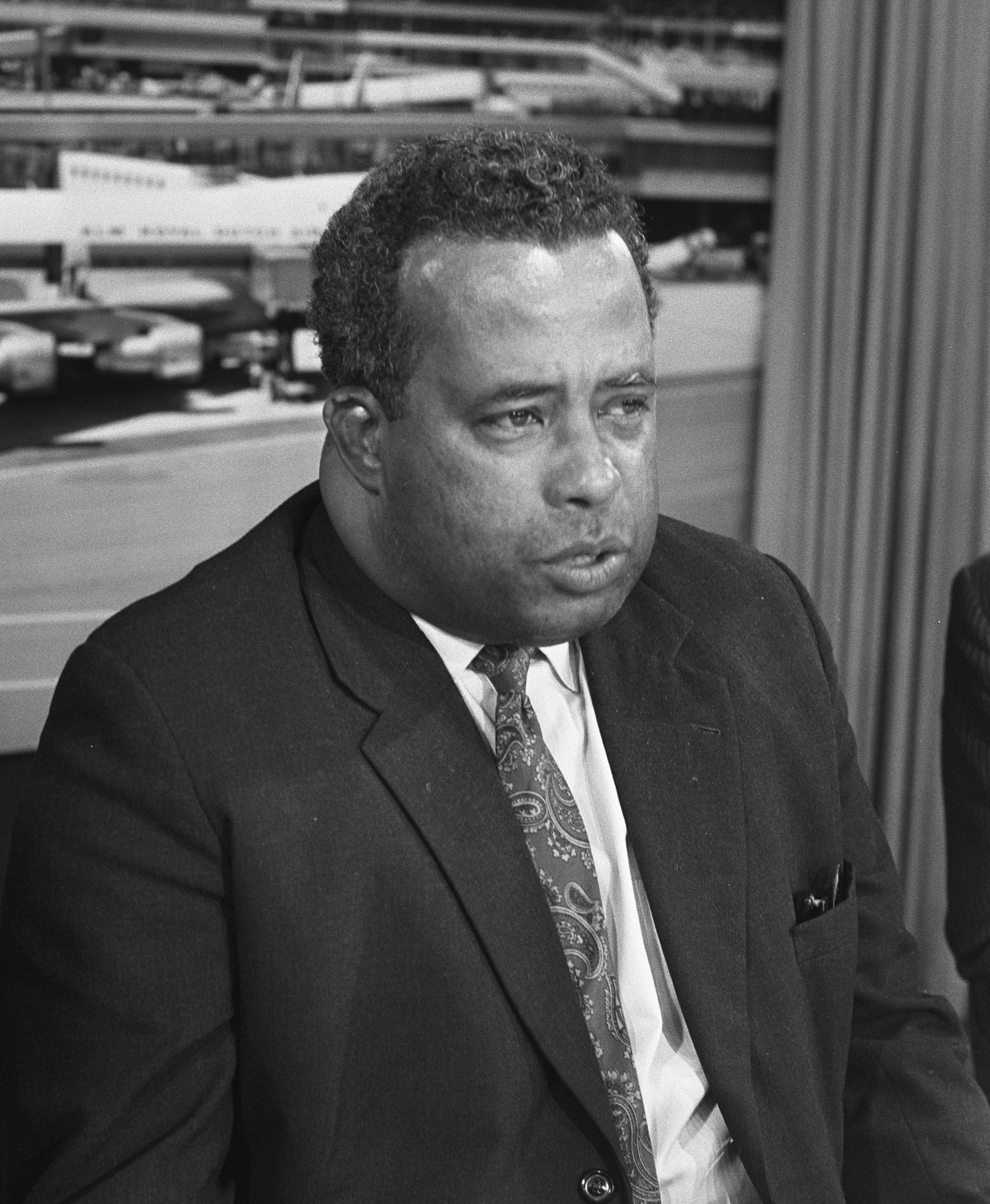
- Sedney in 1973

Prime Minister of Suriname
- In office 20 November 1969 – 24 December 1973
- Monarch: Queen Juliana
- Governor: Johan Ferrier
- Preceded by: Arthur Johan May
- Succeeded by: Henck Arron

Minister of Finance
- In office 25 June 1958 – 30 June 1963
- Monarch: Queen Juliana
- Prime Minister: Severinus Desiré Emanuels
- Preceded by: Willem Smit
- Succeeded by: Johan Adolf Pengel

3rd Governor of the Central Bank of Suriname
- In office December 1980 – January 1983
- Preceded by: Victor Max de Miranda
- Succeeded by: Henk Goedschalk

Personal details
- Born: 28 September 1922 Paramaribo, Colony of Suriname
- Died: 18 June 2020 (aged 97) Paramaribo, Suriname
- Party: Progressive National Party (PNP)

Jules Sedney (28 September 1922 – 18 June 2020) was a Surinamese politician, and Prime Minister of Suriname from 20 November 1969 to 24 December 1973. In 1980, he became governor of the Central Bank of Suriname, but had to flee the country in 1983 after a dispute with Dési Bouterse. Sedney returned to Suriname in 1989.

== Early years and education ==
Sedney was born in Paramaribo. In 1939, Sedney was certified as a classroom assistant, and began working. He passed the customs officer certification exam in 1942 and became a customs officer in Paramaribo. In 1948, Sedney left for Amsterdam to study economics at the University of Amsterdam. During his studies, he joined the organisation Wie Eegie Sanie (Our Own Things), founded by Eddy Bruma to promote Sranan Tongo and Surinamese culture. He obtained his doctorate in economic sciences in 1955 at the University of Amsterdam.

== Political career ==
In 1958, Sedney became Minister of Finance for the NPS. He later joined the breakaway Progressive National Party (PNP) founded by Just Rens. In the 1969 Surinamese general election, Sedney's party bloc took third place. They then formed a government with the first-place VHP bloc led by Jagernath Lachmon. In 1961, Sedney argued for the creation of a scientific institute in Suriname, which later developed into the University of Suriname (currently known as the Anton de Kom University).

From 1969 to 1973, Sedney served as Prime Minister of Suriname. He led a multi-ethnic government that he believed to have the checks and balances necessary to grow the Surinamese economy. In 1969, Sedney embarked on the first steps towards the independence of Suriname: he proposed a Koninkrijkscommissie (Kingdom Commission) which would set the path towards independence. The commission came into effect on 5 January 1972. However, Sedney later became a vocal critic of the same commission, arguing that the Dutch PvdA was acting in undue haste. From Sedney's perspective, independence should have been planned more carefully over a longer time period. He also raised concerns about ethnic tensions.

In 1980, Sedney became the governor of the Central Bank of Suriname. In 1983, he was fired after a dispute with Desi Bouterse about a suspicious loan. In January 1983, he went into exile in the Netherlands. Sedney's citizenship was revoked on 21 July 1983 after he testified in a Dutch court against Henk Herrenberg, the Surinamese ambassador to the Netherlands. He was allowed to return to Suriname in 1989.

== Later life ==
Sedney was the oldest bridge player of Suriname. In 1997, he published De toekomst van ons verleden (The Future of Our Past), a political history of Suriname from 1948 onward. This book included evaluations of Suriname's parliamentary democracy prior to the coup d'état and provided recommendations for strengthening democracy. Successive editions were published in 2010 and 2017. In 2016, he was awarded honorary membership by the VHP. In 2016, the New Harbour in Paramaribo was renamed Dr Jules Sedney – Haven van Paramaribo to recognize his involvement in its founding.

Sedney died on 18 June 2020. He had been hospitalized just prior to his death.

== Selected publications ==
- Jules Sedney, Het werkgelegenheidsaspect van het Surinaamse Tienjaren Plan (The Employment Aspect of the Surinamese Ten-Year Plan). (1955) Amsterdam: S. J. P. Bakker. Doctoral Dissertation.
- Jules Sedney, Ontwerp grondwet van de Pendawa Lima (Concept Constitution). (1986) Amsterdam: S.V.R-Pendawa Lima
- Jules Sedney, De Toekomst van Ons Verleden: Democratie, Etniciteit en Politieke Machtsvorming in Suriname (The Future of Our Past: Democracy, Ethnicity and Political Power in Suriname). (1997, 1st ed.) Paramaribo: VACO Publishers.

== Honours ==
- Suriname: Grand Cordon (Grootlint), Honorary Order of the Yellow Star (November 2008)

Political offices
Preceded by Willem Smit	Minister of Finance; 1958–1963	Succeeded by Johan Adolf Pengel
Preceded by Arthur Johan May	Prime Minister of Suriname; 1969–1973	Succeeded by Henck Arron
Government offices
Preceded by Victor Max de Miranda	Governor of the Central Bank of Suriname; 1980–1983	Succeeded by Henk Goedschalk
