= Jan Raatgever =

Surinamese physician and politician

Estates of Suriname
- In office 1949–1951

Personal details
- Born: Jan Adriaan Francois Raatgever; 16 June 1907 Suriname
- Died: 1953 (aged 45–46) Orange County, Florida, United States
- Party: National Party of Suriname

Jan Adriaan Francois Raatgever (16 June 1907 – 1953) was a Surinamese physician and politician of the NPS.

Raatgever studied at the Geneeskundige School in Paramaribo. In 1934 Raatgever passed both the theoretical and practical surgical exam, and started to work as a physician. At the 1949 Surinamese general election he was elected for the Marowijne District. Major conflicts arose in his party and in 1950 he was one of eight NPS members of the Estates of Suriname to leave the party. He remained a member of the parliament until the general election in 1951. Although he was older than 40, in 1951 he still received a study assignment. He moved to Leiden and became a Doctor of Medicine in July 1952. On 16 September 1952, he migrated to Florida. Raatgever died in Orange County, Florida in 1953.
