= Eddy Bruma =

Surinamese politician, lawyer and writer

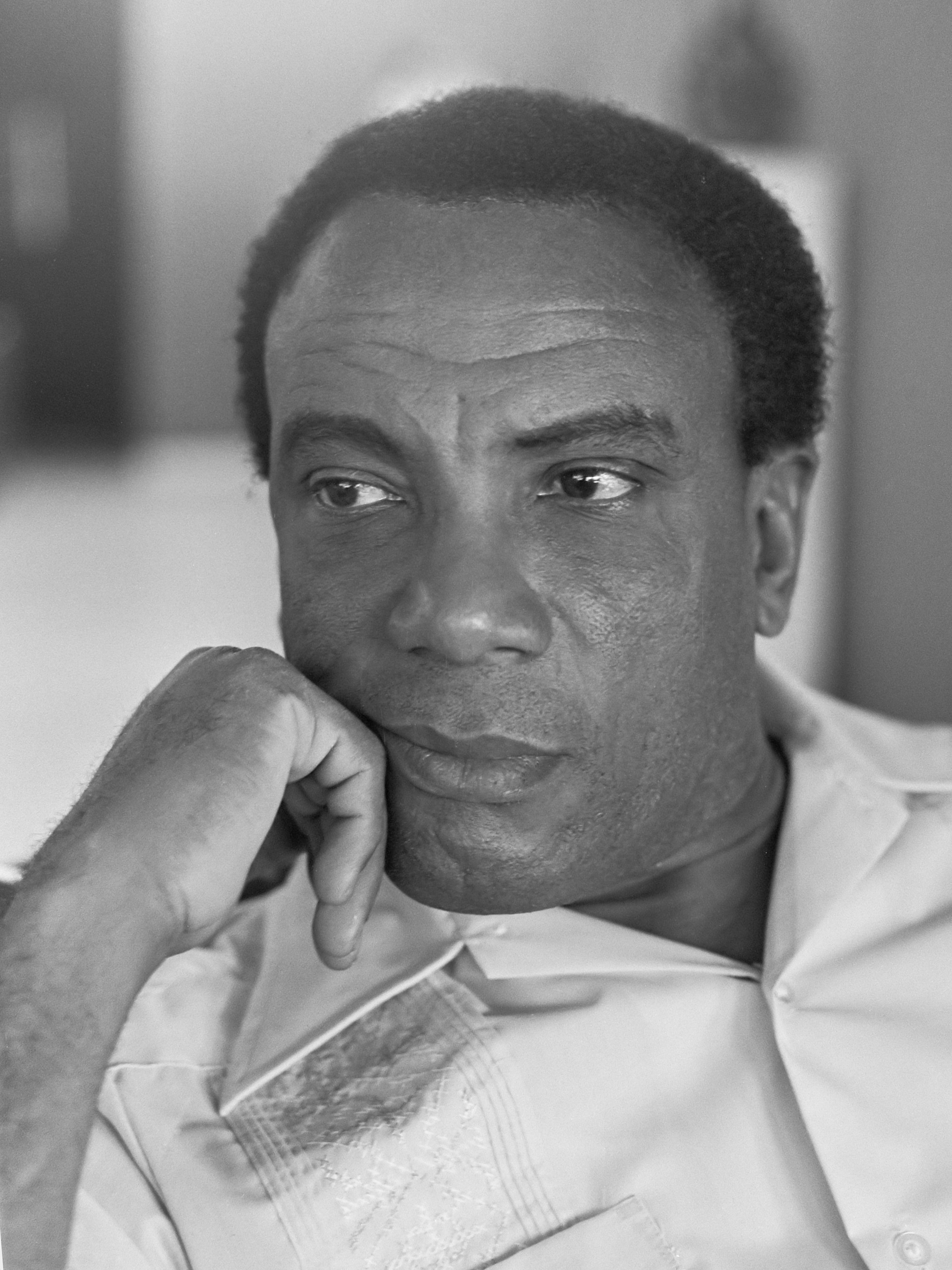
- Born: Eduard Johan Bruma; May 30, 1925; Paramaribo, Suriname
- Died: November 6, 2000 (aged 75); Paramaribo, Suriname
- Occupations: Writer, lawyer, politician
- Political party: Nationalist Republican Party

Eduard Johan "Eddy" Bruma (May 30, 1925 – November 6, 2000) was a Surinamese politician, lawyer and writer.

== Biography ==
Bruma was imprisoned during World War II, because of his nationalistic activities. After the war, he studied law at the Free University Amsterdam and, in 1951, he was involved in the founding of the Surinamese cultural association Wie Eegie Sanie ("our own things"). Bruma considered his own native language so important, that he addressed the World Youth Congress in Bucharest in Sranan Tongo. After returning to Suriname in 1954, he settled as a lawyer in Paramaribo.

In addition, he was also politically active. In 1959, he founded the "Nationalist Movement Suriname", which merged with the Nationalist Republican Party (PNR) in 1961. The PNR strived for immediate independence, while the National Party of Suriname led by Johan Pengel only wanted it in the long term. In that year, the PNR did not obtain a seat at the States elections. In the elections of 24 October 1969, his party did have a seat, after which Bruma, as a member of the parliament, opposed the government led by Prime Minister Jules Sedney. He was also chairman of the Progressive Labour Federation 47 (C-47; a counterpart to the General Alliance of Labour Unions, which was linked to the NPS), until he was succeeded by Fred Derby.

In 1973, the PNR was one of the parties that was part of the National Party Combination (NPK), which won 22 out of 39 seats. After these elections, Bruma was the Minister of Economic Affairs in the Arron cabinet for four years, while his party colleague Eddy Hoost became Minister of Justice. During that reign, the ideal of Bruma was realized; Suriname became independent from the Netherlands in 1975. In the parliamentary elections of 1977, the PNR did not manage to secure a seat.

After the military coup in 1980 led by Dési Bouterse, Bruma became the formateur of the Chin A Sen government, in which, in addition to civilians, members of the National Military Council (NMR) were involved. Chin A Sen, a physician, was a member of the PNR, but was not politically active before. Afterwards, he was mainly active as a lawyer, and sometimes he gave political advice. In October 2000, he was robbed at his home, resulting in a skull fracture. A few weeks later, he died of those injuries in a hospital at the age of 75. President Ronald Venetiaan gave a speech at his state funeral.

== Author ==
The first publication of Wie Eegie Sanie was not in Sranan Tongo, but written in Frisian, and published by the Frisian magazine De Tsjerne in 1952. The main reason was the recent acceptance of the Frisian language after Kneppelfreed. Bruma hoped that the Frisians would support his efforts of normalisation of Sranan Tongo. A large crowd gathered to hear the introduction by Fedde Schurer, but Bruma expected more sympathy for his cause.

That same year, Bruma also wrote De geboorte van Boni about the history of Maroon leader Boni in Dutch, and published poetry in Sranan Tongo for Koenders' Foetoe-boi. In 1954, Bruma became editor covering for Suriname for the De Tsjerne. In 1957, Bruma translated his novel about Boni in Sranan Tongo.
