= Progressive National Party (Suriname) =

Progressive National Party Progressieve Nationale Partij
- Founder: Just Rens
- Founded: 24 January 1967
- Dissolved: 1973
- Split from: National Party of Suriname
- Ideology: Social democracy

The Progressive National Party (Dutch: Progressieve Nationale Partij, PNP) was a political party in Suriname.

The party was founded in January 1967 by Just Rens, a former member of the parliament and Minister of Construction on behalf of the National Party of Suriname, who was fired after a conflict with the party.

In the 1967 Surinamese general election, PNP won three seats in the parliament. Besides Rens, Jules Sedney and Aksel Quintus Bosz were elected. Two and a half years later, the party participated in the early elections as part of the PNP bloc. In addition to the PNP, this partnership consisted of KTPI, PSV and PBP. The PNP bloc won eight seats. PNP formed a coalition with the VHP bloc, in which PNP member Jules Sedney became prime minister.

The 1973 elections were mainly between the National Party Combination (NPK; consisting of NPS, PNR, PSV and KTPI) and the VHP bloc. With almost 3.2% of the votes, the PNP did not win a seat. Of the 39 seats, 22 went to the NPK and the remaining 17 went to the VHP bloc. Afterwards, the PNP would not return to parliament.
