= 1967 Surinamese general election =

- 15 March 1967
- 39 seats in the Estates of Suriname; 20 seats needed for a majority
Party	Leader	Vote %	Seats	+/–
NPS	Johan Pengel	29.49	17	+3
VHP	Jagernath Lachmon	23.03	11	+3
Action Group		13.52	4	+2
PNP		9.62	3	New
SDP		5.83	2	0
PARI		3.95	2	New
This lists parties that won seats. See the complete results below.
Prime Minister before	Prime Minister after
Johan Pengel; NPS	Johan Pengel; NPS

General elections were held in Suriname on 15 March 1967. The result was a victory for the National Party of Suriname, which won 17 of the 39 seats.

== Results ==
Party	Votes	%	Seats	+/–
National Party of Suriname	61,085	29.49	17	+3
Progressive Reform Party	47,708	23.03	11	+3
Action Group	28,010	13.52	4	+2
Progressive National Party	19,930	9.62	3	New
Surinamese Democratic Party	12,075	5.83	2	0
Party for National Unity and Solidarity	11,705	5.65	0	–4
Progressive Surinamese People's Party	9,223	4.45	0	–4
Indonesian People's Party	8,183	3.95	2	New
Nationalist Republican Party	5,378	2.60	0	0
Action Front Dihaat	2,012	0.97	0	–1
Independents	1,810	0.87	0	New
Total	207,119	100.00	39	+3
Source: Nohlen
