= Heinrich Wladimir Mohamed Radja =

Heinrich Wladimir Mohamed Radja (1917 – 7 January 1976) was a Surinamese entrepreneur and politician.

Mohamed Radja was initially a civil servant at customs and during the Second World War he was transferred to the section 'Prijszetting'. Eventually he made it there to section head. At the 1949 Surinamese general election he was elected as VHP-candidate to become a member of the Estates of Suriname. Out of the six VHP members of the Estates of Suriname only two were Muslim: S.M. Jamaludin and H.W. Mohamed Radja. In 1950 both came in conflict with the VHP and started working together with the NPS. At the snap election in 1951 Mohamed Radja was not reelected. Around 1954 he was dismissed after a sick leave. He became an entrepreneur and beside that he was from 1953 to 1961 the chairman of the Surinaamse Islamitische Vereniging (SIV). In 1962 he succeeded G.R. Chin Ten Fung as chairman of the Suriname Chamber of Commerce and Industry. At the end of 1971 Mohamed Radja started 'De Patriot'; a newspaper of which he became the chief editor. After a fire at his printing company MORA in 1973, the newspaper stopped. He was also involved in the design of the mosque at the Keizerstraat in Paramaribo. Mohamed Radja died on 7 January 1976.
