= Percy Wijngaarde =

Surinamese journalist, politician (1915–2005)

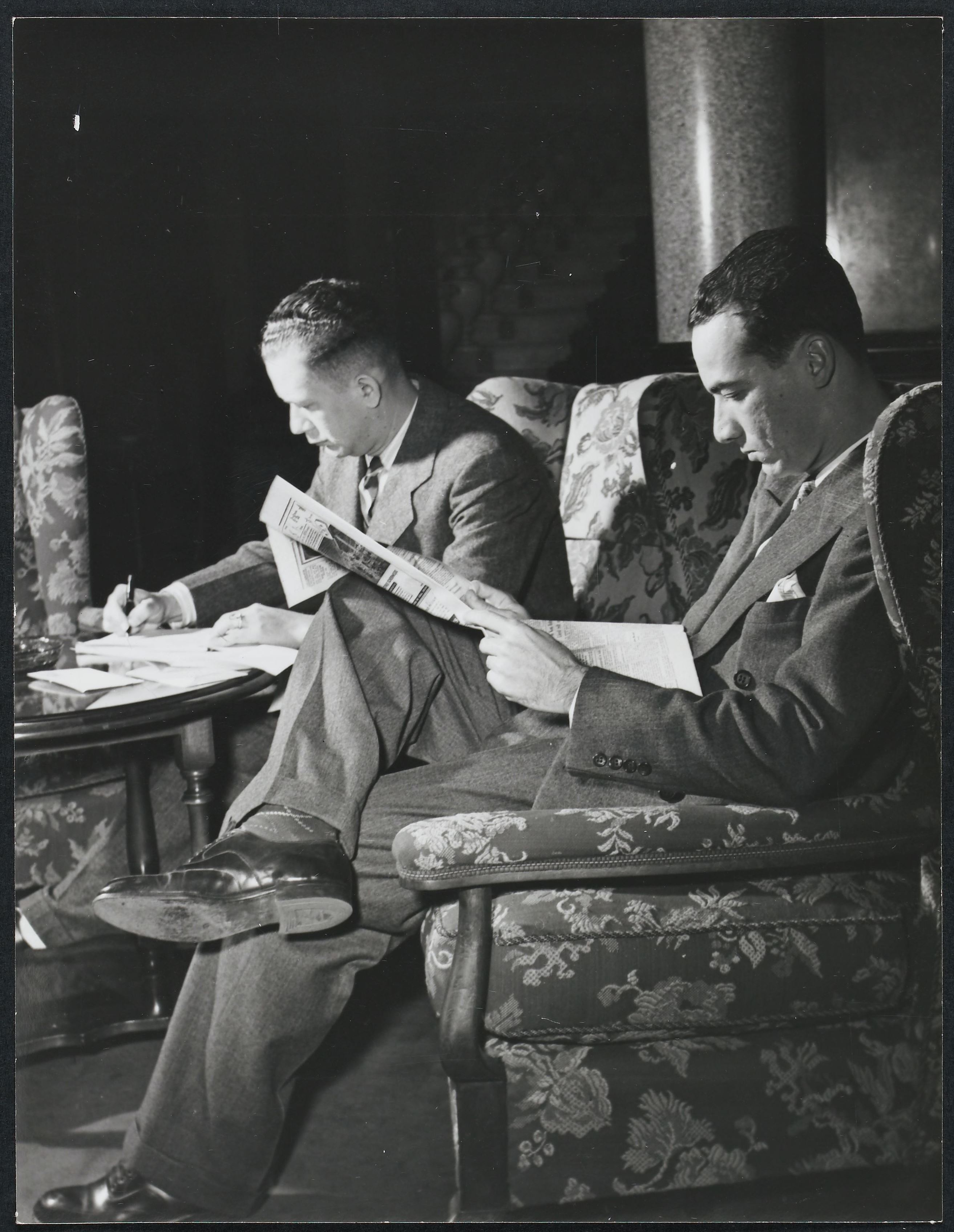
- P. Wijngaarde and D.G.A. Findlay

Member of the Estates of Suriname
- In office 1947–1951

Ambassador of Suriname to Venezuela
- In office 1976–1979

Personal details
- Born: 27 August 1915 Paramaribo, Surinam
- Died: 15 August 2005 (aged 89) Curaçao
- Party: NPS
- Occupation: politician, editor

Percy Wijngaarde (27 August 1915 – 15 August 2005) was a Surinamese journalist, politician of the NPS and diplomat.

== Biography ==
Wijngaarde was born in Paramaribo as a son of Jantje Wijngaarde who was involved in the newspaper Suriname. He studied to become a teacher at an elementary school, but in 1943 he started to work for the Suriname newspaper. After Frederik Lim A Po gave up his position at the Estates of Suriname Wijngaarde won the by-election on May 1, 1947. Just like David Findlay, he combined being a member of the parliament with working as a journalist. At the 1949 Surinamese general election Wijngaarde was re-elected and he became NPS-Parliamentary leader. Major conflicts arose in his party and in 1950 he was one of eight NPS members of the Estates of Suriname to leave the party. He remained a member of the parliament until the general election in 1951. Around 1958 he became the editor-in-chief of the Suriname newspaper and continued until 1971 when the newspaper ceased to exist.

In April 1971, Wijngaarde became a consul-general to Guyana. As a minister plenipotentiary he was working at the Dutch Embassy in Georgetown, Guyana. After the independence of Suriname in 1975 he served as an ambassador of Suriname to Venezuela, and in 1979 consul-general in the Netherlands Antilles. After he retired in 1980, he moved to the Netherlands.

Wijngaarde died on 15 August 2005 in Curaçao at the age of 89.

His brother Edgar Wijngaarde was a businessman and government minister.
