= 1987 Surinamese general election =

- 25 November 1987
- 51 seats in the National Assembly; 26 seats needed for a majority
- Turnout: 84.96%
| Party | Leader | Vote % | Seats | +/– |
|---|---|---|---|---|
| VHP–NPS–KTPI | Pretaap Radhakishun | 85.50 | 40 | +10 |
| NDP | Jules Wijdenbosch | 9.29 | 3 | New |
| PALU | Errol Alibux | 1.69 | 4 | +4 |
| PL | Paul Somohardjo | 1.55 | 4 | 0 |
This lists parties that won seats. See the complete results below.
Results by district
| Prime Minister before | Prime Minister after |
|---|---|
| Jules Wijdenbosch; NDP | Jules Wijdenbosch; NDP |

General elections were held in Suriname on 25 November 1987. They were the first held in the country since the first post-independence elections in 1977, and the first since a new constitution was approved in a referendum held a month earlier.

The Front for Democracy and Development, an alliance of the National Party of Suriname (NPS), the Progressive Reform Party (VHP) and the Party for National Unity and Solidarity (KTPI), won a decisive victory with 40 of the 51 seats with 86% of the vote, the largest vote share achieved by a Surinamese party or alliance since independence in 1975. The National Democratic Party, the political vehicle of Desi Bouterse, the country's de facto leader since a 1980 coup, finished a distant second with three seats. Voter turnout was 85%.

== Results ==
| Party | Votes | % | Seats | +/– |
|---|---|---|---|---|
| Front for Democracy and Development (VHP–NPS–KTPI) (Note: The VHP won 16 of the 40 seats, the NPS 14 and the KTPI 10.) | 147,196 | 85.50 | 40 | +10 |
| National Democratic Party | 16,000 | 9.29 | 3 | New |
| Progressive Workers' and Farmers' Union | 2,910 | 1.69 | 4 | +4 |
| Surinamese Labour Party | 2,704 | 1.57 | 0 | New |
| Pendawa Lima | 2,676 | 1.55 | 4 | – |
| Partij Perbangunan Rakjat Suriname | 664 | 0.39 | 0 | New |
| Total | 172,150 | 100.00 | 51 | +12 |
| Valid votes | 172,130 | 97.23 | | |
| Invalid/blank votes | 4,895 | 2.77 | | |
| Total votes | 177,025 | 100.00 | | |
| Registered voters/turnout | 208,356 | 84.96 | | |
Source: Nohlen (Note: There is a difference of 20 between the party totals and the reported number of valid votes.)

== Aftermath ==
At its first session on 13 January 1988, the National Assembly elected the VHP's Ramsewak Shankar as president. Henck Arron of the NPS, who had led the country as Prime Minister from independence in 1975 until the 1980 coup, became vice president. Their election was assured after the Front for Democracy and Development won 78 percent of the seats at the election. This was enough for Shankar to be elected without the need for support from other blocs; the new constitution required the president to be elected by a two-thirds supermajority of the Assembly. To date, this is the only time under Suriname's present constitution that a party or alliance has won enough seats on its own to elect a president.

However, Shankar and Arron only held office for less than two years before being overthrown in 1990 in another coup engineered by Bouterse.
