= Jozef Weidmann =

Dutch-Surinamese priest and politician

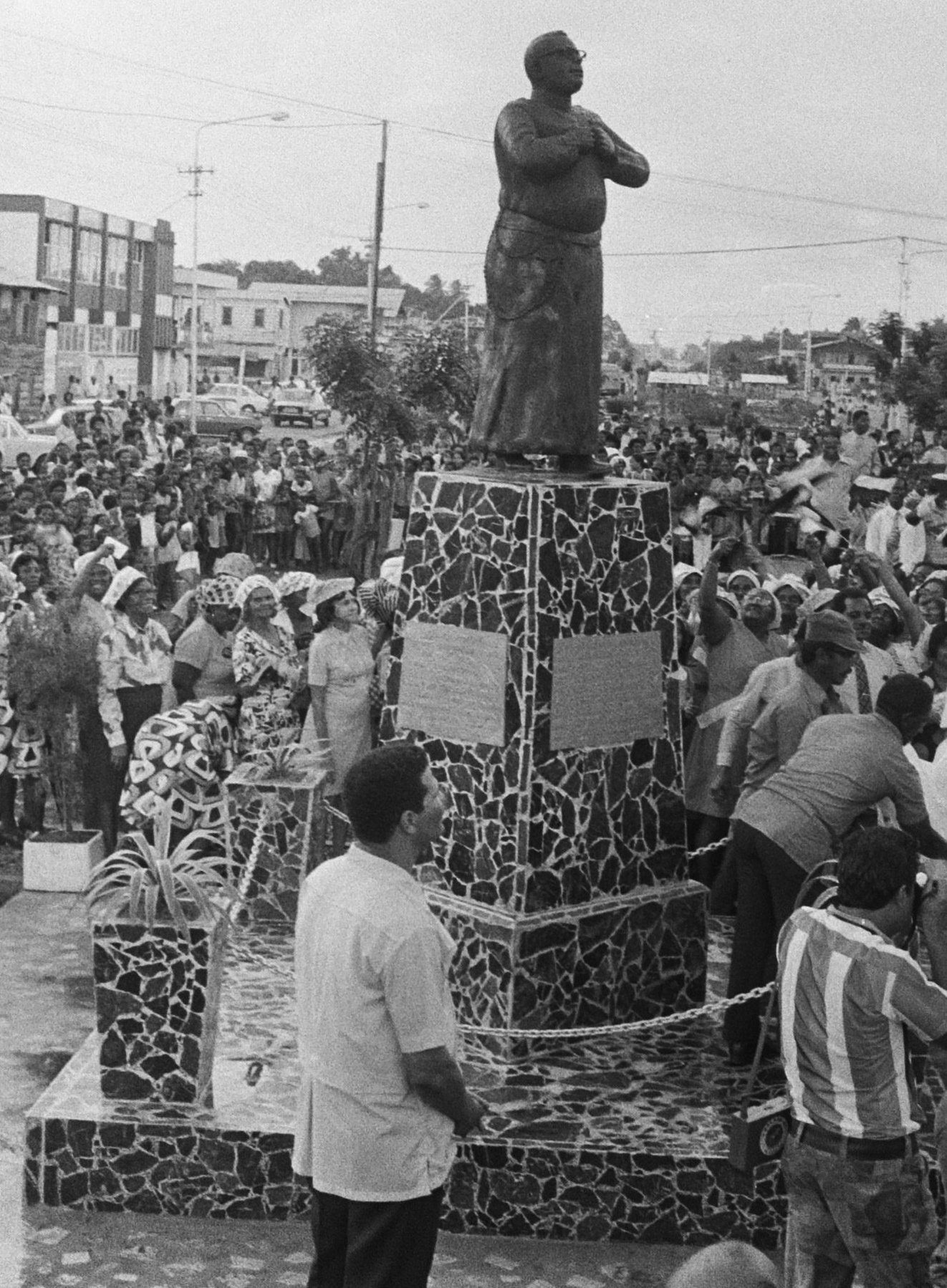
- Statue of Jozef Weidmann
- Born: Leonardus Josephus Weidmann; 3 October 1899; Kerkrade, Netherlands
- Died: 15 September 1962 (aged 62); Paramaribo, Suriname
- Occupations: Priest, politician and union leader

Leonardus Josephus "Jozef" Weidmann (3 October 1899 – 15 September 1962) was a Dutch-Surinamese Catholic priest, politician and union leader. He is one of the founders of the Progressive Surinamese People's Party (PSV). Weidmann played a leading role in establishing universal suffrage in Suriname, and was the founder of Progressive Workers Organisation, the oldest recognised trade union in Suriname.

== Biography ==
Weidmann was born on 3 October 1899 in Kerkrade, Netherlands. In 1925, he was ordained priest of the Catholic Church. In 1928, he was sent to Suriname as a missionary, and worked in the interior among the Maroons and Amerindians. Later, he became a priest in Paramaribo. On 7 December 1942, Wilhelmina of the Netherlands made a radio speech promising autonomy for the colonies. Weidmann decided to become politically active, and asked the Vatican permission to relieve him, and venture into politics.

In August 1946, Weidmann was one of the founders of the Progressive Surinamese People's Party (PSV), a Christian democratic party. He started to emphasise universal suffrage, because he was of the opinion that democracy was not possible without universal suffrage first. On 16 February 1948, Weidmann founded the Progressive Workers Organisation (PWO), the oldest recognised trade union in Suriname, and served as its chairperson. On 7 March 1948, he organised a demonstration for universal suffrage which was attended by more than 20,000 people.

On 28 January 1948, Johann de Miranda, a member of the PSV, attended the First Round Table Conference in The Hague on behalf of Suriname, In July 1948, the States General of the Netherlands voted to extend universal suffrage to Suriname. On 30 May 1949, the first general election was held, however the PSV failed to gain any seats.

Weidmann died on 15 September 1962 at the age of 62.

== Legacy ==
After his death, the Father Weidmann Foundation, was established. The foundation was chaired by Emile Wijntuin and operates a home for stray children. On 1 April 1975, Weidmann was honoured with a statue created by Jozef Klas. The statue is located near the offices of the PWO, and a street in Rainville was named after Father Weidmann. In 1996, Wijntuin published Weidmann, grondlegger van het algemeen kiesrecht in Suriname, a biography about Weidmann and the struggle for universal suffrage.
