= Progressive Surinamese People's Party =

Progressive Surinamese People's Party Progressieve Surinaamse Volkspartij
- Founder: Jozef Weidmann; Coen Ooft
- Founded: 25 August 1946
- Dissolved: 25 August 2014
- Succeeded by: DRS
- Ideology: Christian democracy
- International affiliation: Christian Democrat Organization of America

The Progressive Surinamese People's Party (Dutch: Progressieve Surinaamse Volkspartij, PSV) was a political party in Suriname. The party was a member of the Christian Democrat Organization of America.

The party was founded in August 1946 by, among others, Father Jozef Weidmann and Coen Ooft.

In 1948, party member Johann de Miranda, on behalf of the PSV, went to the First Round Table Conference in the Netherlands, where he pleaded for universal suffrage for men and women. One of the results of this conference was that the census and capacity selection right for men was replaced by a universal suffrage for men and women.

In 1955 three PSV politicians were elected and soon after that two members of the PSV became minister: Willem Smit (Finance) and Lucien Rens (Education and Community Development). Rens was in 1957 succeeded by Julius Johan Jacques Volkerts.

After the elections of 1969 the PSV politician Rudi Vonsée became the Minister of Health.

At the 1973 elections, the PSV belonged to the coalition National Party Combination (NPK), led by Henck Arron, who obtained 22 of the 39 seats. The PSV received two ministerial posts in the Arron cabinet.

In 1977, the NPK once again won 22 of the 39 seats in a slightly changed composition, with another two PSV ministers in the cabinet. As a result of the military coup in 1980 led by sergeant Dési Bouterse, this government came to an end prematurely.

After the restoration of democracy, the PSV no longer played a major role in Surinamese politics.

| Election year | No. of overall seats won | +/– | Votes |
|---|---|---|---|
| 1949 | 0 / 21 | | |
| 1951 | Did not contest | | |
| 1955 | 3 / 21 | ▲3 | |
| 1958 | 4 / 21 | ▲1 | |
| 1963 | 4 / 36 | | |
| 1967 | 0 / 39 | ▼4 | 9,223 |
| 1969 | | | |
| 1973 | 3 / 39 | | |
| 1977 | | | |
| 1987 | Did not contest | | |
| 1991 | 0 / 51 | | 599 |
| 1996 | 0 / 51 | | |
| 2000 | 0 / 51 | | 186 |
| 2005 | 0 / 51 | | |
| 2010 | Did not contest | | |
