= Surinaamse Werknemers Organisatie =

Surinaamse Werknemers Organisatie (Surinamese Workers Organization, abbreviated SWO) was a trade union centre in Suriname.

The organization was founded in 1947. The organization had six affiliated unions. The main force behind the formation of SWO was the Surinamese Miners Union (SMU). Another of the SWO affiliates was the Surinaamse Haven- en Transportarbeiders Bond (Surinamese Dock and Transport Workers Union), with 400 members.

Leo E. A. S. Eliazer was the chairman of SWO, A. C. Calor its general secretary, R. E. Groenhart its vice chairman and A. S. Shukrula and R. Chandrikaperksd its Commissioners. The organization had its offices on Steenbakkerijstraat.

SWO represented candidates in the 1951 Surinamese general election The organization opposed female voting rights.

SWO was a founding member of the International Confederation of Free Trade Unions (ICFTU) in 1949. At the time SWO claimed to have some 18,000 members. SWO was affiliated with ORIT and CADORIT. By 1958 SWO claimed to have some 20,000 members.

When the in Suriname Labour Council (Raad van Vakcentralen) was formed 1951, SWO obtained 3 out of 8 board seats - Eliazer (chairman), J. Strok and R. Groenhart.

SWO had become defunct by 1960. In March 1964 the ICFTU Executive Board decided to consider the SWO membership lapsed after 4 years of unpaid membership fees and a long period without contacts.
