= Sedney =

Sedney is a surname. Notable people with the surname include:

- Jules Sedney (1922–2020), Surinamese politician
- Naomi Sedney (born 1994), Dutch sprinter
- Zoë Sedney (born 2001), Dutch athlete
