= Frits Karsowidjojo =

Surinamese politician

Ferdinand Roslan (Frits) Karsowidjojo (21 May 1909 – 8 May 1977) was a Surinamese politician.

His mother Bok Marroepi had gone to Suriname in 1901 as an 18-year-old indentured laborer from Java in what was then the Dutch East Indies. She gave birth to several children and would die in 1949 in Surinam. In 1949 he himself chose the family name Karsowidjojo and the first names Ferdinand Roslan. Initially he worked as a teacher, but later he switched to the administrative service. At the end of 1962 he became deputy district secretary and five years later he was appointed district secretary. In addition, he was a member of the Estates of Suriname from March 1967. Karsowidjojo was then elected as SRI candidate for the district of Commewijne. He was re-elected in the 1969 by-elections and became the Minister of the Interior. After completing his 4-year term, his political career came to an end. Karsowidjojo died in 1977 at the age of 67.
