= Arthur Johan May =

Surinamese civil servant and politician (1903–1979)

Arthur May

Prime Minister of Suriname (acting)
- In office 5 March 1969 – 20 November 1969
- Monarch: Queen Juliana
- Preceded by: Johan Adolf Pengel
- Succeeded by: Jules Sedney

Personal details
- Born: Arthur Johan May; 2 July 1903 Paramaribo, Surinam
- Died: 8 February 1979 (aged 75) Leidschendam, Netherlands
- Party: Independent politician

Arthur Johan May (2 July 1903 – 8 February 1979) was a Surinamese and Dutch civil servant, and served as acting Prime Minister of Suriname in 1969.

== Biography ==
May was born on 2 July 1903 in Paramaribo. He studied to become a civil servant. From 1945 to 1947, he was stationed in Commewijne District, and temporarily served as District Commissioner for Marowijne. In 1947, he was appointed government secretary.

In 1948, May was asked to form the first College van Algemeen Bestuur (cabinet) in the run up to the first election with universal suffrage. From 3 April 1948 until 18 June 1949, he served as president of the College van Algemeen Bestuur.

After the 1949 elections, he moved to the Netherlands, and worked for the Minister of Foreign Affairs. In 1966, he was appointed Director Western Hemisphere. In August 1968, he retired and returned to Suriname.

In 1969, the government of Pengel fell. May was asked to form a temporary government. From 5 March 1969 until 20 November, May served as acting Prime Minister of Suriname and Interior Minister.

May died on 8 February 1979 in Leidschendam, at the age of 75.

== Honours ==
- Officer of the Order of Orange-Nassau.
