= 1949 Surinamese general election =

- 30 May 1949
- All 21 seats in the Estates; 11 seats needed for a majority
Party	Leader	Vote %	Seats
NPS	J.C. de Miranda	48.11	12
VHP	Jagernath Lachmon	16.50	6
SLO	Iding Soemita	3.97	2
Independents	–	4.78	1
This lists parties that won seats. See the complete results below.
Prime Minister after
J.C. de Miranda; NPS

General elections were held in Surinam on 30 May 1949. The result was a victory for the National Party of Suriname, which won 12 of the 21 seats (and was subsequently joined by the sole independent). Voter turnout was 52%.

== Results ==
Party	Votes	%	Seats
National Party of Suriname	107,615	48.11	12
Progressive Surinamese People's Party	45,763	20.46	0
United Hindustani Party	36,900	16.50	6
Surinamese Farmers' Organisation	8,881	3.97	2
Christian Social Party	5,535	2.47	0
People's Party of Indonesians in Suriname	3,199	1.43	0
Agrarian Party	1,659	0.74	0
Negro Political Party	1,488	0.67	0
Women's Committee	1,184	0.53	0
International Unemployeds' Union	756	0.34	0
Independents	10,684	4.78	1
Total	223,664	100.00	21
Total votes	50,490	–	
Registered voters/turnout	96,466	52.34	
Source: De Surinamer, Het Nieuws, Mangal Mitrasing

=== Results by constituency ===
==== Constituency I: Paramaribo ====
Candidate	Party	Votes	%	Notes
Emile de la Fuente	National Party of Suriname	11,341	6.22	Re-elected
David George Findlay	National Party of Suriname	10,992	6.03	Re-elected
Wim Bos Verschuur	National Party of Suriname	10,941	6.00	Re-elected
Gerard van der Schroeff	National Party of Suriname	10,493	5.76	Re-elected
Percy Wijngaarde	National Party of Suriname	10,480	5.75	Re-elected
Leo Lauriers	National Party of Suriname	10,198	5.60	Re-elected
Henk van Ommeren	National Party of Suriname	10,136	5.56	Elected
Johan Adolf Pengel	National Party of Suriname	9,744	5.35	Elected
Otto Wong	National Party of Suriname	9,479	5.20	Re-elected
Rudolf Bernhard William Comvalius	National Party of Suriname	9,117	5.00	Elected
L.J. Weidmann	Progressive Surinamese People's Party	5,988	3.29	
Cornelis Jong Baw	Progressive Surinamese People's Party	4,781	2.62	
A.R.M. Tjin A Djie	Progressive Surinamese People's Party	4,770	2.62	
J. Sookdwesing	United Hindustani Party	4,377	2.40	
J.A. Emanuels	Progressive Surinamese People's Party	4,209	2.31	
P.J.C. Waaldijk	Progressive Surinamese People's Party	4,201	2.31	
H.A. van Eyck	Progressive Surinamese People's Party	4,132	2.27	
N. Anakram	United Hindustani Party	4,092	2.25	
L.C. Biervliet	Progressive Surinamese People's Party	4,080	2.24	
J.H.A. van den Bergh	Progressive Surinamese People's Party	4,033	2.21	
A.A.J. Eygenberger	Progressive Surinamese People's Party	4,029	2.21	
C.A. Montpellier	Progressive Surinamese People's Party	3,935	2.16	
R.G. Budhram	United Hindustani Party	3,782	2.08	
O.A. Tribhuawan	United Hindustani Party	3,701	2.03	
Frederik Lim A Po	Independent	2,849	1.56	
K.R.S. Coleridge	Christian Social Party	1,589	0.87	
A.L.R. Smit	Independent	1,314	0.72	
A.W.L. Putscher	Women's Committee	1,184	0.65	
A.P. Lieuw Kie Song	Independent	1,086	0.60	
S.E.H. Sanches	Independent	1,072	0.59	
T.A.C. Comvalius	Independent	986	0.54	
A. Currie	Agrarian Party	930	0.51	
K.P. van Westen	Christian Social Party	737	0.40	
L.M. Meursinge	Agrarian Party	729	0.40	
J.W. van Lijnden	Christian Social Party	726	0.40	
H.J. Kensenhuys	Christian Social Party	656	0.36	
R.L Eyken	Christian Social Party	491	0.27	
D.P. Leetz	Negro Political Party	469	0.26	
J.M. van Eer	Independent	467	0.26	
A.M.F. Oostburg	Christian Social Party	451	0.25	
E.G. Halfhide	Christian Social Party	448	0.25	
C.E. Vervuurt	Christian Social Party	437	0.24	
A.E.V. Baank	Independent	414	0.23	
Grace Schneiders-Howard	Independent (Note: Supported by Surinamese Farmers' Organisation)	386	0.21	
H.N. Liesdek	International Unemployeds' Union	380	0.21	
H. Faverus	Negro Political Party	379	0.21	
C.E. Wolff	International Unemployeds' Union	376	0.21	
S.M.F. Lieveld	Negro Political Party	354	0.19	
H.E. Lupson	Negro Political Party	286	0.16	
Total		182,227	100.00	
Valid votes		182,227	91.68	
Invalid/blank votes		16,540	8.32	
Total votes		198,767	100.00	
Source: De Surinamer, Het Nieuws

==== Constituency II: Suriname ====
Candidate	Party	Votes	%	Notes
Jagernath Lachmon	United Hindustani Party	4,197	76.57	Elected
Hanif Nurmohamed	Surinamese Farmers' Organisation	693	12.64	
Ming Doelman	People's Party of Indonesians in Suriname	341	6.22	
L.F. Petri-Hedges Abraham	Independent	250	4.56	
Total		5,481	100.00	
Registered voters/turnout		11,294	–	
Source: De Surinamer, Mangal Mitrasing

==== Constituency III: Suriname ====
Candidate	Party	Votes	%	Notes
Sheik Mohamed Jamaludin	United Hindustani Party	4,953	84.23	Elected
Achmed Djamin	Surinamese Farmers' Organisation	927	15.77	
Total		5,880	100.00	
Valid votes		5,880	96.66	
Invalid/blank votes		203	3.34	
Total votes		6,083	100.00	
Registered voters/turnout		12,009	50.65	
Source: De Surinamer, Mangal Mitrasing

==== Constituency IV: Suriname ====
Candidate	Party	Votes	%	Notes
Leo Eliazer	Independent (Note: Candidate of the Paranam Mineworkers' Union, subsequently joined the National Party of Suriname)	889	37.23	Elected
Emanuel Ferdinand Pierau	Independent	563	23.58	
Rachmat Soerodinson	Surinamese Farmers' Organisation	522	21.86	
Harry Eugène Gustaaf Sweeb	Progressive Surinamese People's Party	353	14.78	
G.R. Slijngard	Independent (Note: Supported by the Christian Social Party)	61	2.55	
Total		2,388	100.00	
Registered voters/turnout		6,574	–	
Source: De Surinamer, Mangal Mitrasing

==== Constituency V: Commewijne ====
Candidate	Party	Votes	%	Notes
Iding Soemita	Surinamese Farmers' Organisation	2,325	23.15	Elected
Ashruf Karamat Ali	Surinamese Farmers' Organisation	2,179	21.70	Elected
S. Panday	United Hindustani Party	1,698	16.91	
Soekdew Mungra	United Hindustani Party	1,535	15.28	
Salikin Hardjo	People's Party of Indonesians in Suriname	884	8.80	
H. Seljee	National Party of Suriname	791	7.88	
James Alexander Mac May	National Party of Suriname	284	2.83	
J. Schüngel	Independent	347	3.46	
Total		10,043	100.00	
Registered voters/turnout		15,900	–	
Source: De Surinamer, Mangal Mitrasing

==== Constituency VI: Saramacca ====
Candidate	Party	Votes	%	Notes
Hemradj Shriemisier	United Hindustani Party	1,426	27.88	Elected
Ludwig Sitalsing	United Hindustani Party	1,412	27.61	Elected
Radiman Rakin	Surinamese Farmers' Organisation	929	18.16	
Arga Karta	Surinamese Farmers' Organisation	912	17.83	
Mohamed Zen Sharif	People's Party of Indonesians in Suriname	152	2.97	
Johannes Wagimo Kariodimedjo	People's Party of Indonesians in Suriname	146	2.85	Unseated
Ragoenath Banwarie	Progressive Surinamese People's Party	138	2.70	
Total		5,115	100.00	
Valid votes		5,115	98.46	
Invalid/blank votes		80	1.54	
Total votes		5,195	100.00	
Source: Mangal Mitrasing

==== Constituency VII: Nickerie ====
Candidate	Party	Votes	%	Notes
Sewraam Rambaran Mishre	United Hindustani Party	2,871	29.24	Elected
Heinrich Wladimir Mohamed Radja	United Hindustani Party	2,856	29.08	Elected
A.R. Wix	National Party of Suriname	1,731	17.63	
Frits Karsowidjojo	People's Party of Indonesians in Suriname	1,676	17.07	
Jozef Hosein	Surinamese Farmers' Organisation	394	4.01	
George Guillaume Maynard	Progressive Surinamese People's Party	292	2.97	
Total		9,820	100.00	
Valid votes		9,820	98.10	
Invalid/blank votes		190	1.90	
Total votes		10,010	100.00	
Source: De Surinamer, Mangal Mitrasing

==== Constituency VIII: Coronie ====
Candidate	Party	Votes	%	Notes
Paul Kolader	National Party of Suriname	881	60.38	Elected
Philip Ignatius Inocentius van Daal	Progressive Surinamese People's Party	578	39.62	
Total		1,459	100.00	
Valid votes		1,459	97.72	
Invalid/blank votes		34	2.28	
Total votes		1,493	100.00	
Registered voters/turnout		1,681	88.82	
Source: De Surinamer, Mangal Mitrasing

==== Constituency IX: Marowijne ====
Candidate	Party	Votes	%	Notes
Jan Raatgever	National Party of Suriname	1,007	80.50	Elected
Otto Sanches	Progressive Surinamese People's Party	244	19.50	
Total		1,251	100.00	
Registered voters/turnout		2,061	–	
Source: De Surinamer, Mangal Mitrasing
