= Rudi Vonsée =

Surinamese physician and politician

Rudy George Henri (Rudi) Vonsée (December 29, 1926, in Paramaribo – April 25, 2016, in Geldrop) was a Surinamese physician and politician.

In 1946 his mother made an official request to change his surname from Balinge to Vonsée. In 1950 he came to the Netherlands and two years later he returned to Suriname as a medical graduate. He worked there as a company doctor at Billiton and was a general practitioner in Paramaribo from 1956 to 1961. He then left for the Netherlands again to specialize as a gynecologist. In 1966 Vonsee started working at the academic hospital in Paramaribo and from 1968 he was temporarily director-physician of a regional hospital in Nieuw-Nickerie. At the end of 1969 he became the Minister of Health on behalf of the Progressive Surinamese People's Party (PSV), stipulating that he could also remain somewhat active as a gynecologist. Two years later, he quite suddenly left politics and started working as a gynecologist at the St. Gregorius Hospital in Brunssum, Limburg. He then indicated that he wanted to go for a PhD.

Vonsee died in 2016 at the age of 89.
