= Khemradj Kanhai =

Surinamese politician (1912–1988)

Estates of Suriname
- In office 1951–1958

Personal details
- Born: 4 June 1912 Paramaribo, Suriname
- Died: 26 November 1988 (aged 76) Amsterdam, Netherlands
- Party: Progressive Reform Party (VHP)

Khemradj Kanhai (4 June 1912 – 26 November 1988) was a Surinamese politician of the VHP.

Kanhai was born in Paramaribo. He studied bookkeeping, but failed his examination. He proceeded to work as a shop assistant at Sauwma, and later he became active in wholesale and retail. Kanhai was also a board member of the Chamber of Commerce and Factories.

Kanhai was also active in politics as a board member of the 'Hindu Party' that merged in 1949 into the VHP of which he became the treasurer. At the 1951 Surinamese general election the two seats of the Estates of Suriname for the district Nickerie went to the VHP members Oedayrajsing Varma and Kanhai. Both were re-elected in 1955, but at the election in 1958 the VHP candidates Rambaran Mishre and Kanhai in that district lost to the NOP candidates Poetoe and Kolhoe.

In 1974, a year before Suriname became independent, he moved to Amsterdam where he died in 1988 at the age of 76.
