= Stuart Robles de Medina =

Surinamese sculptor, painter and designer

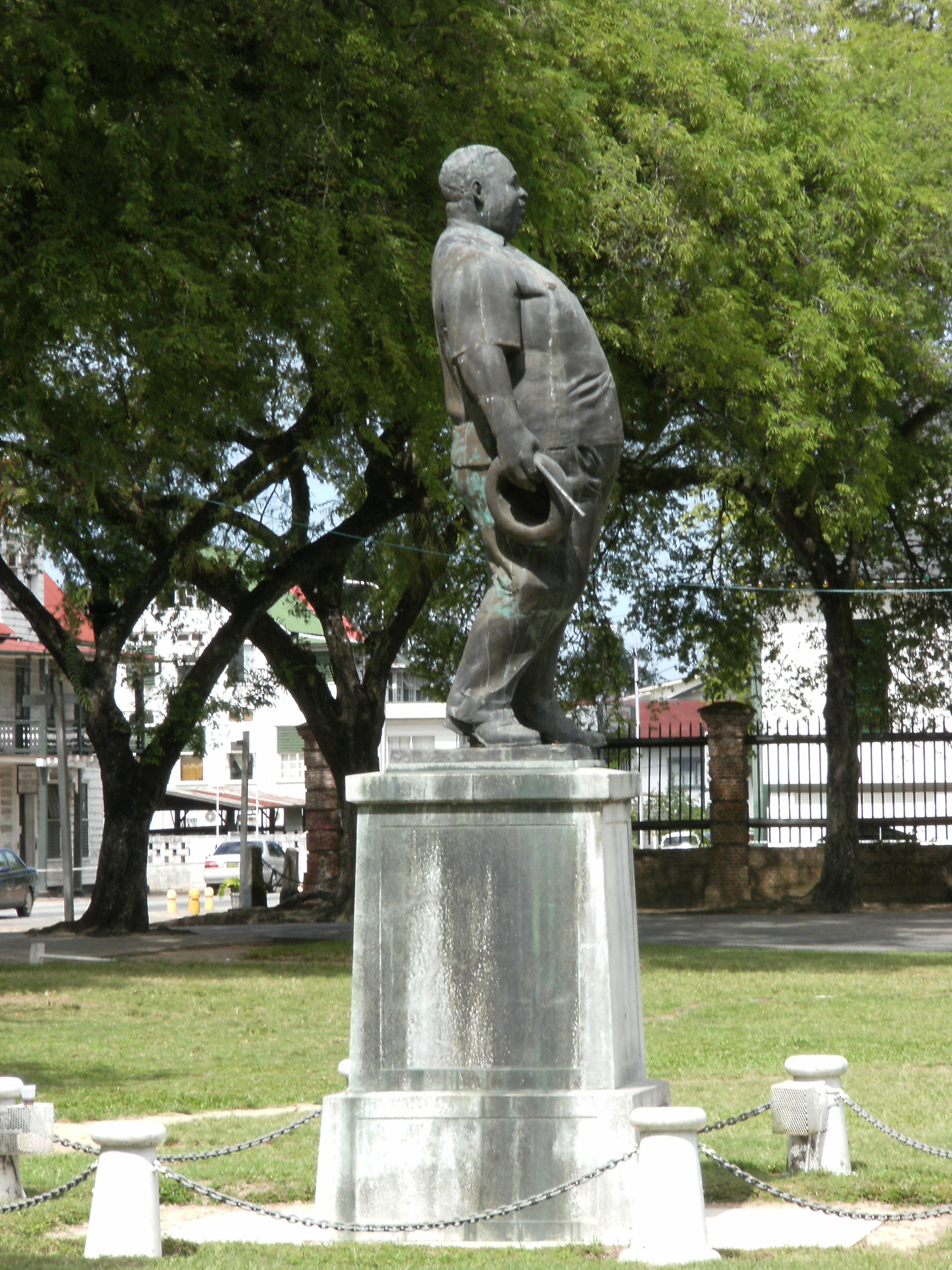
Statue of Johan Pengel

Stuart Sasha Henricus Robles de Medina (December 14, 1930 - May 20, 2006) was a Surinamese sculptor, painter and designer.

As a visual artist, Robles de Medina received several large orders, which the result can still be seen in Paramaribo. One of these assignments was the statue of Johan Adolf Pengel on Onafhankelijkheidsplein in 1970, after the death of Pengel. The statue is made of bronze. On June 5, 1974, the statue was unveiled.

May 8, 1966, was the 100th anniversary of the States of Suriname. On this occasion, a monument made of bronze by Robles de Medina was unveiled on Spanhoek.

Outside these assignments he was also a painter. Most of his works are in private collections. At least one work is in the Suriname Museum in Paramaribo.

On April 24, 2006, the Honorary Order of the Yellow Star was awarded by then President Ronald Venetiaan to Stuart Robles de Medina. The insignia were hung around his bed, where he lay while he was ill, by a representative of the Surinamese Embassy in The Hague.

After an illness he died on May 20, 2006, in his hometown Eindhoven in the Netherlands.
