= Jules Sof =

Surinamese politician

Estates of Suriname
- In office 1954–1955
- In office 1958–1969

Personal details
- Born: Jules George Sof; 25 February 1914 Paramaribo, Suriname
- Party: National Party of Suriname

Jules George Sof (born 25 February 1914) was, before Suriname became independent, a member of the Estates of Suriname for the NPS.

== Biography ==
Sof was born as a son of Egbertus Charles Godfried Sof in Paramaribo. In 1954, he joined the main board of the NPS of which he for some time also was the secretary. A few months later he was elected in the parliament at a by-election (caused by the death of NPS member of parliament F.J.A. Murray) in the Marowijne District. At the 1955 Surinamese general election the NPS lost almost all the seats in parliament and also Sof was not reelected. He was civil servant in Moengo when he could return in 1958 to the Estates of Suriname. This time he would stay 11 years member of parliament and he was also the NPS-faction leader. At the general election in 1969 Sof was unsuccessfully the NPS candidate for the district Upper-Marowijne.

== Honours ==
- Suriname: Officer in the Honorary Order of the Palm (1985).
- Netherlands: Officer in the Order of Orange-Nassau.
