= Party for National Unity and Solidarity =

Political party in Suriname

Party for National Unity and Solidarity Kerukunan Tulodo Pranatan Inggil
- Abbreviation: KTPI
- Chairperson: Iwan Ganga
- Founder: Iding Soemita
- Founded: 28 November 1949
- Ideology: Javanese Surinamese interests
- National affiliation: A-Combination (formerly); V7 (2015); Megacombinatie (formerly)

The Party for National Unity and Solidarity (Javanese: Kerukunan Tulodo Pranatan Inggil, KTPI) is a political party in Suriname historically supported by Javanese Surinamese.

== History ==
The party was founded by Iding Soemita on 28 November 1949. He led the party until 1972, when his son Willy Soemita succeeded him as party chairman. Willy Soemita retired November 2019, and Iwan Ganga became the new leader. Ganga is the first non-Javanese chairman; he joined from the VHP in 2000.

== Electoral results ==
| Election | No. of overall seats won | +/– | Votes | Government | Representation | Notes |
|---|---|---|---|---|---|---|
| 1949 | 2 / 21 | ▲2 | | Opposition | | |
| 1951 | 2 / 21 | 0 | | Opposition | | |
| 1955 | 2 / 21 | 0 | | Coalition | | |
| 1958 | 2 / 21 | 0 | | Opposition | | |
| 1963 | 4 / 36 | ▲2 | | Opposition | | |
| 1967 | 0 / 39 | ▼4 | 11,705 | Extra-parliamentary | | |
| 1969 | 0 / 39 | 0 | | Extra-parliamentary | | |
| 1973 | 2 / 39 | ▲2 | | Coalition | | |
| 1977 | 2 / 39 | 0 | | Coalition | | |
| 1987 | 11 / 51 | ▲9 | | Coalition | | |
| 1991 | 7 / 51 | ▼4 | | Coalition | | |
| 1996 | 5 / 51 | ▼2 | | Coalition | | |
| 2000 | 1 / 51 | ▼4 | | Opposition | Willy Soemita | part of the Millennium Combination (MC) |
| 2005 | 1 / 51 | 0 | | Opposition | Rame Amatsoerdi | part of the Volksalliantie Voor Vooruitgang (VVV) |
| 2010 | 2 / 51 | ▲1 | | Coalition | Refano Wongsoredjo; Oesman Wangsabesari | part of the Megacombinatie (MC) |
| 2015 | 0 / 51 | ▼2 | 1,677 | Extra-parliamentary | | |
| 2020 | did not contest | | | | | |
