= Ramkisoen Dewdat Oedayrajsing Varma =

Estates of Suriname
- In office 1951–1958

Personal details
- Born: March 1907 Nieuw Nickerie, Suriname
- Died: 1968 (aged 60–61) Suriname
- Party: Progressive Reform Party (VHP)

Ramkisoen Dewdat Oedayrajsing Varma (March 1907 – 1968) was a member of the Estates of Suriname for the VHP during the 1950s.

Varma was born in Nieuw Nickerie. He studied to become a teacher at a primary school, but did not finish it. He became a priest at the Arya Samay and a trader. In 1950 he officially became an interpreter of Hindustani languages in the Nickerie District and he was also chairman of the van Drimmelenpolder water board.

At the 1951 Surinamese general election Oedayrajsing Varma was elected in the Nickerie District to become a member of the Estates of Suriname. Four years later he was re-elected. In April 1958 Oedayrajsing Varma and VHP member Soekdew Mungra supported a vote of confidence in the Ferrier government, although the VHP was at that moment in opposition. As a result Ferrier could remain in power a little longer. At the snap election a few months later he was no longer a VHP candidate. He continued with his cultural and religious activities.

Oedayrajsing Varma died of a sudden heartache during a speech in 1968.
