= Severinus Desiré Emanuels =

Surinamese politician

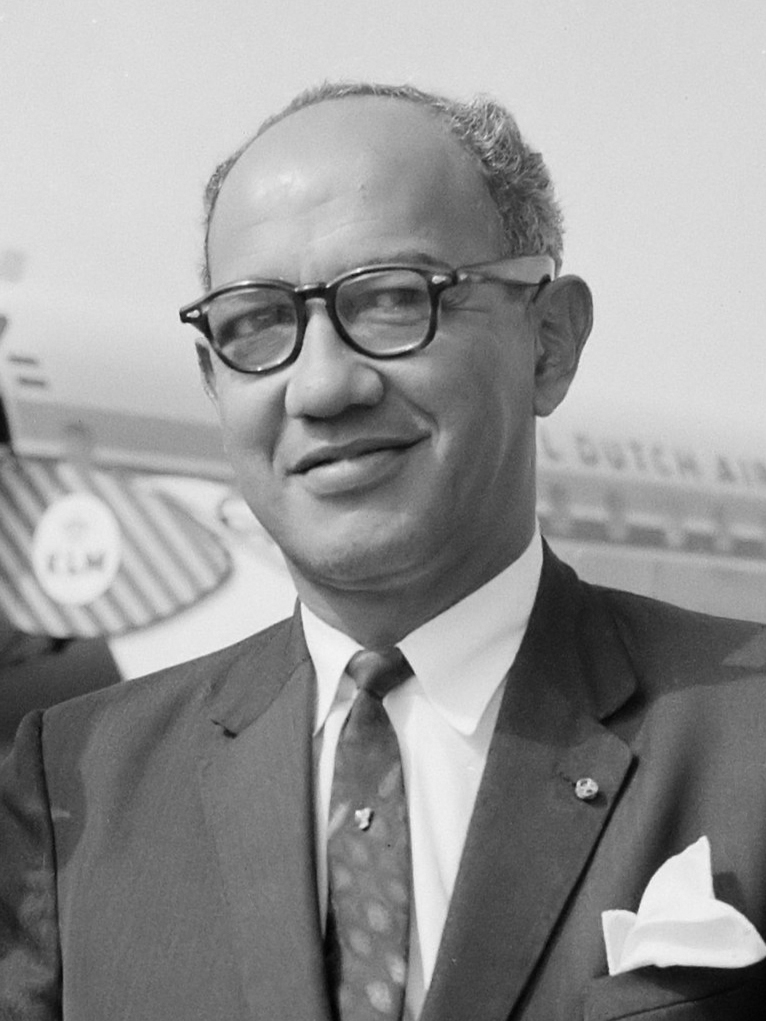
- Severinus Desiré Emanuels in 1962

Prime Minister of Suriname
- In office 14 July 1958 – 30 June 1963
- Preceded by: Johan Ferrier
- Succeeded by: Johan Adolf Pengel

Minister of Finance
- In office 6 September 1952 – 1 April 1955

Personal details
- Born: 27 February 1910; Rotterdam, Netherlands
- Died: 27 August 1981 (aged 71); The Hague, Netherlands
- Political party: National Party of Suriname
- Profession: Politician

Severinus Desiré "Freek" Emanuels (27 February 1910 – 27 August 1981) was a Dutch politician, and Prime Minister of Suriname from 25 June 1958 to 30 June 1963.

== Biography ==
Emanuels was born in Rotterdam on 27 February 1910. He studied law at the Utrecht University. From 1934 to 1950, he worked as a judge in the Dutch East Indies, and its successor Indonesia. In 1948, he was an advisor for the Federal Conference of Bandung. Between 1952 and 1955, he served as Surinamese Minister of Finance in the Currie government.

In 1958, he was working for the Dutch embassy in Washington, D.C. Formateur Johan Adolf Pengel asked Emanuels to lead a government which he accepted, and he arrived in Suriname on 14 July 1958. He served as Prime Minister of Suriname from 1958 to 1963. In September 1959, he asked the States General of the Netherlands to boycott South Africa which was denied, however Suriname was permitted to implement their own trade boycott. In 1961, his government unsuccessfully tried to negotiate more autonomy for Suriname.

In 1963, Emanuels was succeeded by Pengel, and appointed Minister Plenipotentiary of Suriname. In 1965, he returned to the Dutch Ministry of Foreign Affairs. He retired in 1976.

Emanuels died on 27 August 1981 in The Hague, at the age of 71.
