= 1951 Surinamese general election =

- 14 March 1951
- 21 seats in the Estates; 11 seats needed for a majority
Party	Leader	Seats	+/–
NPS	Archibald Currie	13	0
VHP	Jagernath Lachmon	6	0
KTPI	Iding Soemita	2	0
This lists parties that won seats. See the complete results below.
Prime Minister before	Prime Minister after
J.C. de Miranda; NPS	Jacques Drielsma; Independent

General elections were held in Surinam on 14 March 1951. The result was a victory for the National Party of Suriname, which won 13 of the 21 seats.

== Results ==
Party	Votes	%	Seats	+/–
National Party of Suriname			13	0
United Hindustani Party			6	0
Party for National Unity and Solidarity			2	0
Agrarian Party			0	New
Christian-Social Party			0	0
Congress Party			0	New
Total			21	0
Registered voters/turnout		38.4		
Source: Nohlen

=== Elected members ===
- National Party of Suriname
  - Frederik Lim A Po
  - Paul Kolader
  - David George Findlay
  - Henk van Ommeren
  - Johan Adolf Pengel
  - Rudolf Bernhard William Comvalius
  - Frederick James Alexander Murray
  - Johan Kraag
  - Stuart Harry Axwijk
  - Emanuel Ferdinand Pierau
  - James Alexander Mac May
  - Huerta Milano Celvius Bergen
  - Just Rens
- United Hindustani Party
  - Jagernath Lachmon
  - Harry Radhakishun
  - Harry Francois Sewberath Misser
  - Soekdew Mungra
  - Khemradj Kanhai
  - Ramkisoen Dewdat Oedayrajsing Varma
- Party for National Unity and Solidarity
  - Ashruf Karamat Ali
  - Iding Soemita

=== Changes ===
- Guno Kletter succeeded Lim A Po after by-election in 1953.
- Jules Sof succeeded Murray after by-election in 1954.
