= Suriname (Kingdom of the Netherlands) =

Constituent country of the Kingdom of the Netherlands, 1954–1975

Country of Suriname Land Suriname
- 1954–1975
- Flag Coat of arms
- Anthem: God zij met ons Suriname (Dutch) "God be with our Suriname" Royal anthem: Wilhelmus (Dutch) (Latinised version of the name "William")
- Status: Constituent country of the Kingdom of the Netherlands
- Capital: Paramaribo
- Common languages: Dutch (official) 11 other languages: Sranan Tongo; Sarnami Hindustani; Javanese; Ndyuka; Saramaccan; Kwinti; Chinese; English; Portuguese; French; Spanish; 8 native languages: Akurio; Arawak-Lokono; Carib-Kari'nja; Sikiana-Kashuyana; Tiro-Tiriyó; Waiwai; Warao; Wayana
- Government: Parliamentary constitutional monarchy
- Monarch
  - 1954–1975: Juliana
- Governor General
  - 1954–1956: Jan Klaasesz
  - 1956–1963: Jan van Tilburg
  - 1963–1964: Archibald Currie
  - 1968–1975: Johan Ferrier
- Prime Minister
  - 1954–1955: Archibald Currie
  - 1955–1958: Johan Ferrier
  - 1958–1963: Severinus Desiré Emanuels
  - 1963–1969: Johan Adolf Pengel
  - 1969–1973: Jules Sedney
  - 1973–1975: Henck Arron
- Legislature: Estates of Suriname
- History
  - Proclamation of Charter: 15 December 1954
  - Independence: 25 November 1975
- Currency: Dutch guilder (until 1962); Surinamese guilder (after 1962)
- ISO 3166 code: SR
Preceded by	Succeeded by
Surinam (Dutch colony)	Suriname

Suriname was a constituent country of the Kingdom of the Netherlands between 1954 and 1975. The country had full autonomy, except in areas of defence and foreign policy, and participated on a basis of equality with the Netherlands Antilles and the Netherlands itself in the Kingdom of the Netherlands. The country became fully independent as the Republic of Suriname on 25 November 1975.

== History ==
The origin of the administrative reform of 1954 was the 1941 Atlantic Charter (stating "the right of all peoples to choose the form of government under which they will live", and the desire for "a permanent system of general security"), which was signed by the Netherlands on 1 January 1942. Changes were proposed in the 7 December 1942 radio speech by Queen Wilhelmina. In this speech, the Queen, on behalf of the Dutch government-in-exile in London, expressed a desire to review the relations between the Netherlands and its colonies after the end of the war. After liberation, the government would call a conference to agree on a settlement in which the overseas territories could participate in the administration of the kingdom on a basis of equality. Initially, this speech had propaganda purposes; the Dutch government had the Dutch East Indies (now Indonesia) in mind, and hoped to appease public opinion in the United States, which had become skeptical towards colonialism.

After Indonesia became independent, a federal construction was considered too heavy, as the economies of Suriname and the Netherlands Antilles were insignificant compared to that of the Netherlands. In the charter, as enacted in 1954, Suriname and the Netherlands Antilles each obtained a Minister Plenipotentiary based in the Netherlands, who had the right to participate in Dutch cabinet meetings when it discussed affairs that applied to the kingdom as a whole, when these affairs pertained directly to Suriname and/or the Netherlands Antilles. Delegates of Suriname and the Netherlands Antilles could participate in sessions of the First and Second Chambers of the States-General. An overseas member could be added to the Council of State when appropriate. According to the charter, Suriname and the Netherlands Antilles were also allowed to alter their "Basic Laws" (Staatsregeling). The right of the two autonomous countries to leave the kingdom unilaterally, was not recognised; yet it also stipulated that the charter could be dissolved by mutual consultation.

=== Moving towards independence ===
In 1954 and during the 1950s, the Dutch government strongly opposed the idea of full independence for its former colony. Suriname had been given far-reaching autonomy in order to keep it within the kingdom. This changed in the 1960s, especially after the Netherlands New Guinea crisis of 1962, and the riots in Curaçao in 1969. In the 1960s virtually all parties in the Dutch parliament began to support the idea of full independence for Suriname as soon as possible. The former colonies in the Caribbean had become a fiscal burden and the Dutch government had lost control over their internal administration. The Dutch Labour Party added to these political and economic reasonings an ideological argument: colonialism was considered wrong and all its remnants, such as the inclusion of Suriname and the Netherlands Antilles in the Kingdom of the Netherlands, should be eliminated.

The Den Uyl cabinet that took office in May 1973 and stated that the Caribbean countries within the kingdom were to become independent during its term in office. The Netherlands Antilles rejected the idea, but Suriname was willing to talk. The Surinamese government under Jules Sedney argued that the Netherlands was acting in undue haste, and that independence required longer-term planning. The newly elected government of Henck Arron however accepted Den Uyl's invitation that Suriname be independent by the end of 1975. After long negotiations, and with a very substantial severance package amounting to 3.5 billion Dutch guilders of Dutch aid, Suriname became independent on 25 November 1975. On 21 November, the statue of Queen Wilhelmina was removed from Oranjeplein and replaced with the Surinamese flag. Oranjeplein was renamed Independence Square. The Dutch flag was lowered for the last time in the evening of 24 November. A big party started around midnight. The first day of the independent Republic of Suriname was celebrated in the company of Princess Beatrix, Prince Claus and Prime Minister Den Uyl. On 25 November, Johan Ferrier, the former Governor, was sworn in as president, while in The Hague, Queen Juliana signed the treaty of sovereignty.

== Dutch Guiana ==
The term Dutch Guiana (Dutch: Nederlands Guiana) is often unofficially used for Suriname, in an analogy to British Guiana and French Guiana. Officially, the name has always been Surinam or Suriname, both in Dutch and English, Before 1814, however, there were several Dutch colonies in the Guianas: Suriname, Berbice, Essequibo, Demerara, and Pomeroon. The last four were taken over by the United Kingdom in 1814 and united into British Guiana in 1831. The term Dutch Guiana applied to the period before 1814 does not describe a distinct political entity, but rather a group of colonies under Dutch sovereignty. Therefore, the term "Governor of Dutch Guiana" should not cause confusion if applied to the period after 1814. Before 1814, however, its use is incorrect because the Governor of Suriname did not rule the other Dutch colonies in the Guianas.
