= Nationalist Republican Party (Suriname) =

Nationalist Republican Party Partij Nationalistische Republiek
- Founder: Eddy Bruma
- Founded: 1959
- Dissolved: 1980
- Succeeded by: Surinamese Labour Party
- Ideology: Social democracy Nationalism

The Nationalist Republican Party (Dutch: Partij Nationalistische Republiek, PNR) was a political party in Suriname, existing from 1959 to 1980.

== History ==
In 1951, Surinamese students in the Netherlands founded the cultural association Wi Eigi Sani ("our own things"). In 1959, the association became a political party under the name "Nationalist Republican Party" (PNR), and began its activities in Suriname. In the 1969 parliamentary election, the party secured one seat, by Eddy Bruma. In 1973, in a coalition with the National Party of Suriname, the party won 4 seats in the parliament. In the cabinet of Henck Arron from December 24, 1973 to 1977, the cabinet consisted of 3 representatives of the party.

In 1977, the coalition broke up and the Nationalist Republican Party went to the elections independently, without receiving seats in the parliament. On 25 February 1980, a military coup led by sergeant Dési Bouterse overthrew Arron's government. Bouterse began to rule Suriname as the head of the National Military Council, created by him. He dissolved the parliament, abolished the constitution, introduced a state of emergency in the country and created a special tribunal that examined the affairs of members of the former government and large businessmen. Members of the Nationalist Republican Party were members of the National Military Council. Party member Henk Chin A Sen was president from August 15, 1980 to February 4, 1982. After the restoration of democracy in 1987, the party was not restored. The Surinamese Labour Party is considered to be the successor of the Nationalist Republican Party of Suriname.

== Electoral results ==
Election year	No. of overall seats won	+/–	Votes	%	Government	Representation
1969	1 / 39	▲1	15,943	7.81	Opposition	Eddy Bruma
1973	4 / 39	▲3			Coalition	Eddy Bruma; Robin Ewald Ravales; Désiré Willem Refos; Harold Hubert Rusland
1977	0 / 39	▼4	5,871	4.75	Extra-parliamentary	

== See also ==
- Category:Nationalist Republican Party (Suriname) politicians
