= Henck Arron =

First Suriname Prime Minister (1936–2000)

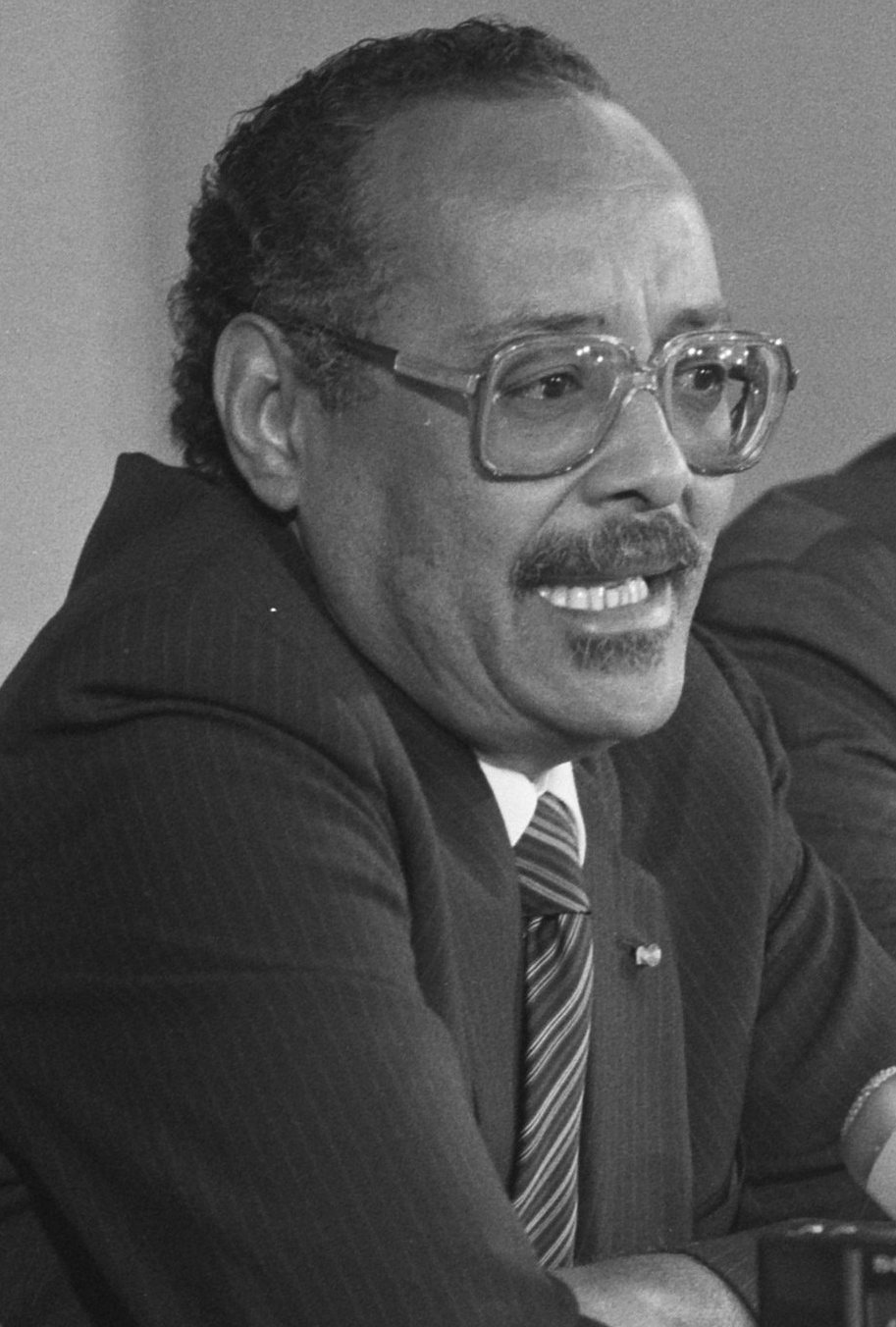
- Henck Arron in 1988

1st Vice President of Suriname
- In office 25 January 1988 – 24 December 1990
- President: Ramsewak Shankar
- Preceded by: Office Established
- Succeeded by: Jules Wijdenbosch

Prime Minister of Suriname
- In office 24 December 1973 – 25 February 1980
- Monarch: Queen Juliana (1973–1975)
- President: Johan Ferrier (1975–1980)
- Governor General: Johan Ferrier (1973–1975)
- Preceded by: Jules Sedney
- Succeeded by: Henk Chin A Sen

Personal details
- Born: Henck Alphonsus Eugène Arron; 25 April 1936 Paramaribo, Suriname
- Died: 4 December 2000 (aged 64) Alphen aan den Rijn, Netherlands
- Party: National Party of Suriname
- Spouse: Antoinette Leeuwin

Henck Alphonsus Eugène Arron (25 April 1936 – 4 December 2000) was a Surinamese politician who served as the first Prime Minister of Suriname after it gained independence in 1975. A member of the National Party of Suriname, he served from 24 December 1973 with the transition government, to 25 February 1980. He was overthrown in a coup d'état by the military, led by Dési Bouterse. Released in 1981 after charges of corruption were dropped, he returned to banking, his previous career. In 1987, Arron was elected as Vice President of Suriname and served until another coup in 1990 overthrew the government.

== Biography ==
Arron was born in Paramaribo in 1936. He completed high school in 1956, and moved to the Netherlands to study banking. Arron worked several years at the Amsterdamsche Bank. On return to Suriname, he became staff member at the Vervuurts Bank (current name Hakrinbank). In late 1963, he became deputy director of the Volkskredietbank (People's Credit Union).

In 1961, Arron became a member of the National Party of Suriname (NPS), the main Creole party. In 1970, Arron was chosen as the Chairman of the NPS. In 1973, he created a coalition which included the pro-independence Nationalist Republican Party (PNR), that won that year's general election. On 24 December 1973, Arron became prime minister, and lead the final negotiation for the independence of Suriname. The NPS found an ally in the Dutch Labour Party (PvdA) who wanted independence as soon as possible. In February 1974, Arron announced that Suriname would be seeking independence before the end of 1975. Many observers were surprised, as Arron's NPS did not have a majority in favour of independence.

The Netherlands granted Suriname independence on 25 November 1975. The independence was marked by social unrest, economic depression, and rumours of corruption. Its leaders were accused of fraud in the 1977 elections, in which Arron won a further term. During the first years of independence about one-third of the population emigrated to the Netherlands.

The hastily created Suriname National Army had many non-commissioned officers who tried to unionise complaining about corruption, and poor pay. Arron refused to recognise them, and arrested the ringleaders who were to go to trial on 26 February 1980. Also, elections were planned for March of that year. On 25 February, Arron was overthrown and jailed in a coup by the military led by Dési Bouterse. In 1981, Arron was released under house arrest. A year later, he was selected as managing director of the Surinamese People's Credit Bank.

In 1987, the United Nations, Netherlands, France, and United States pressured the military government to negotiate, and Suriname saw a return to democracy. That year Arron was elected as Vice President of Suriname (and therefore Chairman of the Council of Ministers), serving from 26 January 1988 to 24 December 1990. Ramsewak Shankar was elected as president. Their government was overthrown in 1990 in another coup by Bouterse and the military.

In December 2000, Arron was invited by the Royal Tropical Institute to the Netherlands to talk about 25 years of Surinamese independence. On the evening of 4 December, he died at the home of his brother as a result of cardiac arrest.

== Gallery ==
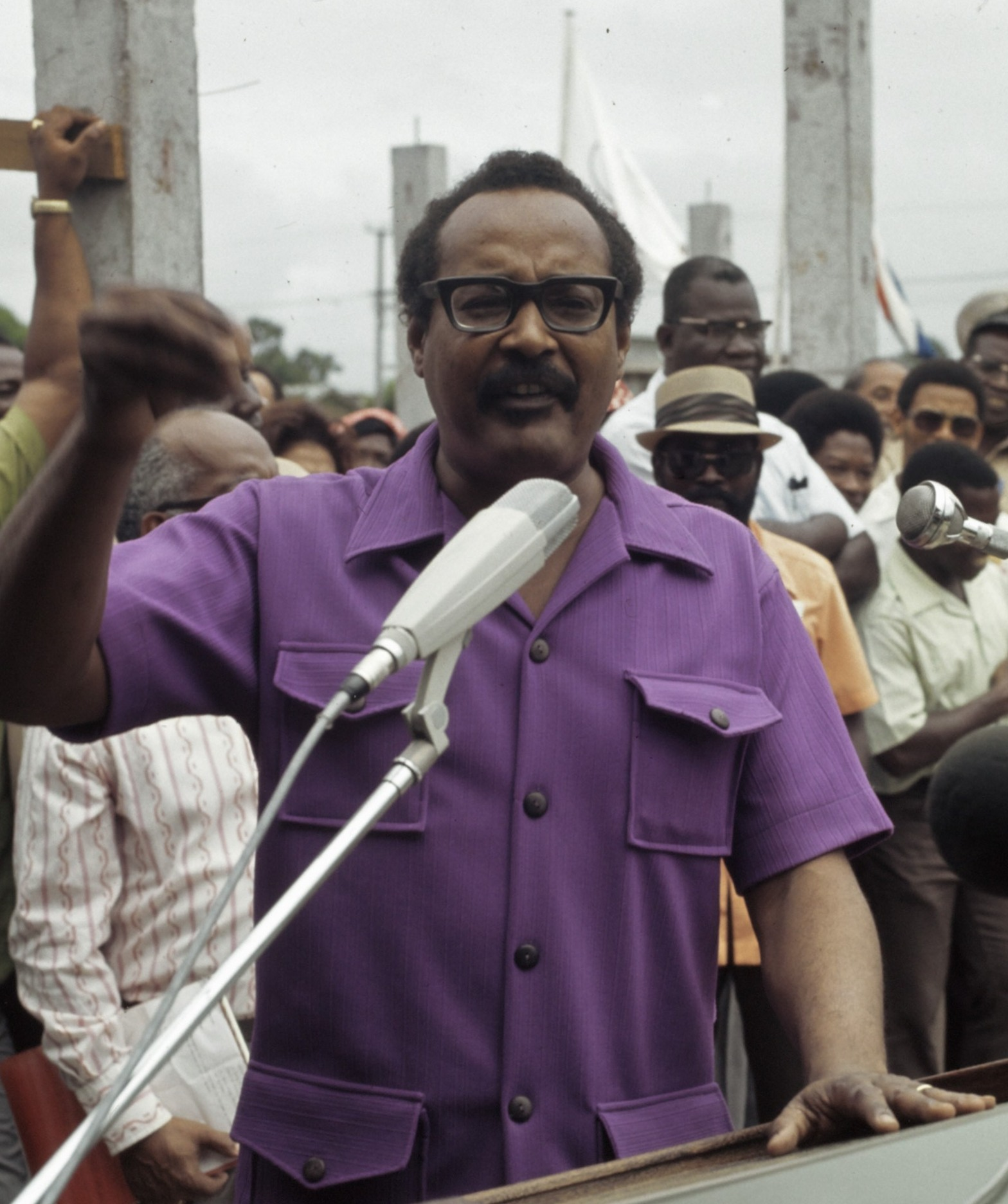
Arron in 1975

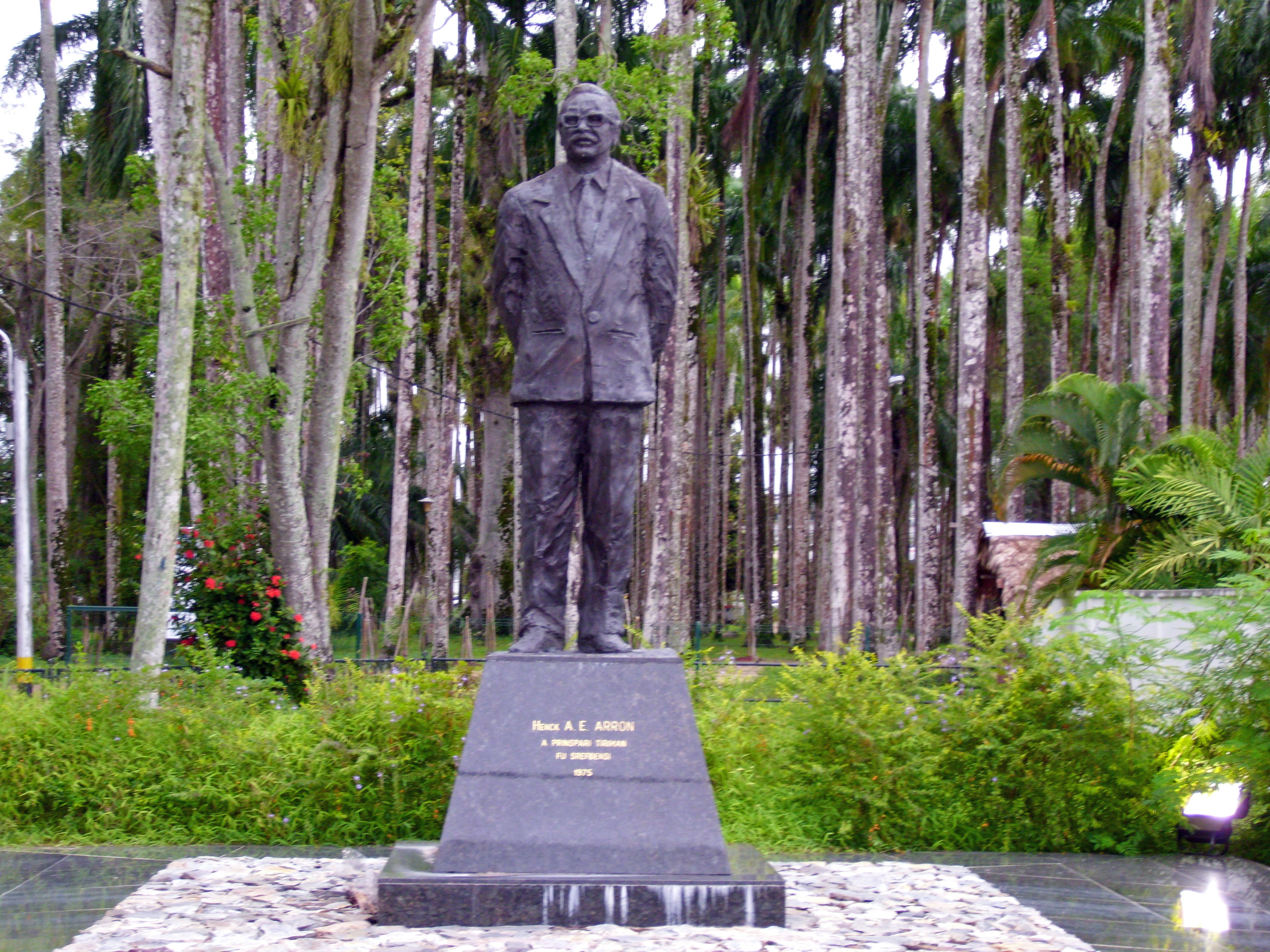
Statue of Arron in Paramaribo

== Honours ==
- Suriname: Grand Cordon (Grootlint), Honorary Order of the Yellow Star (2000)

Political offices
Preceded by Jules Sedney	Prime Minister of Suriname; 1973–1980	Succeeded by Henk Chin A Sen
Preceded by Position established	Vice President of Suriname; 1988–1990	Succeeded by Jules Wijdenbosch
