= Progressive Reform Party (Suriname) =

Political party in Suriname

Progressive Reform Party Vooruitstrevende Hervormings Partij (Dutch) वूरुइत्स्त्रेवेन्दे हेर्वोर्मिङ्स पर्तिज (Sarnami Hindustani)
- Abbreviation: VHP
- Chairman: TBD
- Founded: January 1949
- Merger of: Muslim Party; Hindostaans-Javaanse Political Party; Surinamese Hindu Party
- Ideology: Social democracy Third Way; Civic nationalism Historical: Indo-Surinamese civil rights Javanese Surinamese civil rights Hindu and Muslim religious rights
- Political position: Centre to centre-left
- National affiliation: V7 (2015); New Front for Democracy and Development (formerly)
- Seats in the National Assembly: 17 / 51

Website
- vhp.sr

The Progressive Reform Party (Dutch: Vooruitstrevende Hervormings Partij, VHP; Sarnami Hindustani: वूरुइत्स्त्रेवेन्दे हेर्वोर्मिङ्स पर्तिज or प्रगतिशील सुधार दल, Pragatisheel Sudhaar Dal) (Note: formerly known as the United Hindustani Party (Dutch: Verenigde Hindoestaanse Partij; Sarnami Hindustani: संयुक्त हिंदुस्तानी पार्टी, Samyukt Hindustani Party; 1949–August 1966) and the Vatan Hitkari Party (English: Party for the Promotion of National Welfare; Dutch: Partij ter Bevordering van het Nationale Welzijn, Sarnami Hindustani: वतन हितकारी पार्टी, Vatan Hitkari Party; August 1966 – 1973)) is a political party in Suriname. It was originally founded in January 1949 as a merger of three parties to represent the Indo-Surinamese community. The party occupies a position straddling the political centre and centre-left, advocating for a combination of social-democratic and social-liberal policies under the Third Way philosophy. During the party's history it frequently allied itself with the National Party of Suriname (NPS) that historically represented the Afro-Surinamese community.

Chan Santokhi was the chairman of the party from 3 July 2011 to 30 March 2026. The VHP is a multi-ethnic party and is primarily supported by Indo-Surinamese. Previous chairman Ram Sardjoe holds the title of honorary chairman. After the 2020 parliamentary elections, the Progressive Reform Party became the biggest political party in Suriname and Chan Santokhi became the new President of Suriname.

The party has been part of seven government coalitions, in the periods of: 1958–1963 (five years), 1963–1967 (four years), 1969–1973 (four years), 1987–1991 (four years), 1991–1996 (five years), 2000–2005 (five years), 2005–2010 (five years), and 2020–2025 (five years). In 2020, the party formed a coalition government with the General Liberation and Development Party led by Ronnie Brunswijk, the new Vice President of Suriname.

== Early representation ==
1949

- S. Rambaran Mishre
- H.W. Mohamed Radja
- L.B. Sitalsing
- H. Shriemisier
- J. Lachmon
- S.M. Jamaludin

1951

- J. Lachmon
- H. S. Radakushun
- H. F. Sewberath Misser
- J. S. Mungra
- K. Kanhai
- R. D. Oedayrajsing Varma

1955

- J. Lachmon
- H.S. Radakushun
- H.F. Sewberath Misser
- J.S. Mungra
- K. Kanhai
- R.D. Oedayrajsing Varma

1958

- J. Lachmon
- H. Mungra
- H.S. Radakushun
- M. Ramdjan

1963

- J.H. Adhin
- J. Lachmon
- B. Laigsingh
- L. Mungra
- R.M. Nannan Panday
- D. Sathoe
- H. Shriemisier

== Electoral results ==
Election	No. of overall seats won	Votes	+/–	Rank		Government
1949	6 / 21		▲6	2nd		Opposition
1951	6 / 21		0	2nd		Opposition
1955	6 / 21		0	2nd		Opposition
1958	4 / 21		▼2	2nd		Coalition
1963	8 / 36		▲4	2nd		Coalition
1967	11 / 39		▲3	2nd		Opposition
1969	19 / 39		▲6	1st		Coalition
1973	16 / 39		▼1	2nd		Opposition
1977	13 / 39		▼3	2nd		Opposition
1987	14 / 51		▲1	2nd		Coalition
1991	8 / 51		▼5	2nd		Coalition
1996	9 / 51 4 / 51 (*after BVD defection)		▲1 ▼5	3rd		Opposition
2000	8 / 51		▼1	2nd		Coalition
2005	7 / 51		▼1	2nd		Coalition
2010	8 / 51		▲1	2nd	Paramaribo: 2 (of 17); Wanica: 3 (of 7); Nickerie: 1 (of 5); Commewijne: 1 (of 4); Saramacca: 1 (of 3)	Opposition
2015	9 / 51	55,276	▲1	2nd	Paramaribo: 2 (of 17) 0 Wanica: 3 (of 7) 0 Nickerie: 2 (of 5) ▲1; Commewijne: 1 (of 4) 0 Saramacca: 1 (of 3) 0	Opposition
2020	20 / 51	108,378	▲11	1st	Paramaribo: 7 (of 17) ▲5 Wanica: 5 (of 7) ▲2 Nickerie: 4 (of 5) ▲2 Commewijne: 2 (of 4) ▲1 Saramacca: 2 (of 3) ▲1	Coalition

== Chairmen ==
The party has had four chairmen since its founding:

- 16 January 1949 – 18 October 2001: Jagernath Lachmon
- 19 October 2001 – 23 December 2001: Jnan Adhin
- 23 December 2001 – 3 July 2011: Ramdien Sardjoe
- 3 July 2011 – 30 March 2026: Chan Santokhi
