= Jagernath Lachmon =

Surinamese politician (1916–2001)

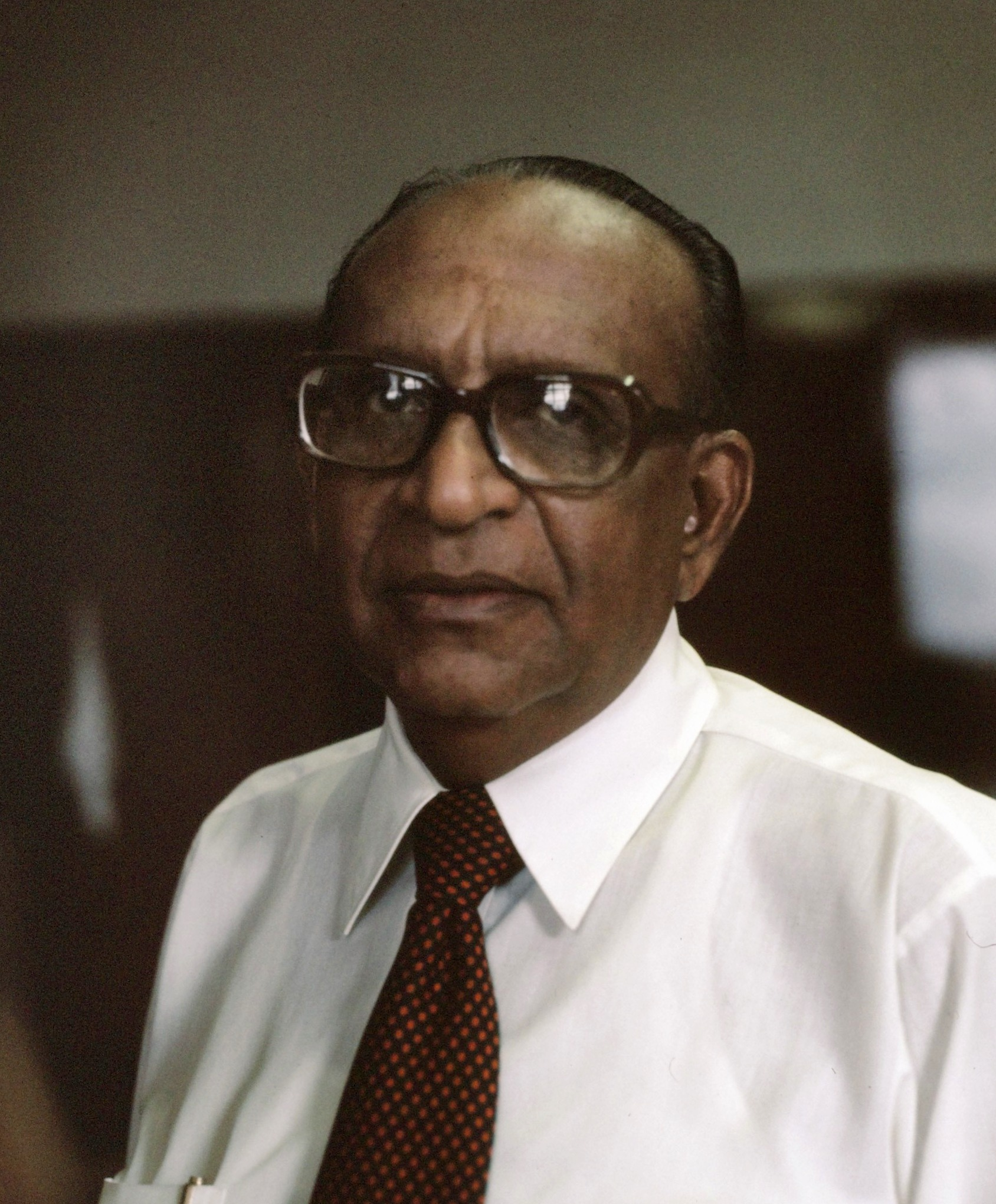
- Jagernath Lachmon in 1975

Chairperson of the National Assembly of Suriname
- In office 24 July 2000 – 19 October 2001
- Preceded by: Marijke Djwalapersad
- Succeeded by: Ram Sardjoe
- In office 14 December 1987 – 9 October 1996
- Preceded by: Ulrich Aron
- Succeeded by: Marijke Djwalapersad

Chairperson of the Estates of Suriname
- In office 18 November 1969 – 15 December 1973
- Preceded by: Emile de la Fuente
- Succeeded by: Olton van Genderen

Personal details
- Born: 21 September 1916 Nickerie, Surinam
- Died: 19 October 2001 (aged 85) The Hague, Netherlands
- Party: Progressive Reform Party (VHP)
- Spouse: Fawziya Lachmon

Jagernath Lachmon, also Jaggernath Lachmon, (21 September 1916 – 19 October 2001) was a Surinamese politician. He was one of the founders of the Progressive Reform Party (VHP), an Indo-Surinamese party founded in 1947 of which he served as president until his death.

== Biography ==
Lachmon was born in Corantijnpolder in the district of Nickerie. The youngest child of six, his parents were contract laborers from Uttar Pradesh to Suriname. His father was a cook and his mother clipped cane on the plantation Waterloo. His parents had chosen the surname Lachmon when they arrived at the plantation. Later, his parents started a small dairy farm in Nieuw Nickerie.

Lachmon left for Paramaribo when he was thirteen, and completed his school qualifications. On the advice of one of his teachers, he decided to practise law. At that time, there were restrictions about legal studies in Suriname. After a long search, he found the creole lawyer Julius Caesar de Miranda who became mentor. Surprised that a Creole was willing to teach an Indian made a great impression on the young Lachmon and laid the basis for his efforts towards reconciliation between the different ethnic groups.

In 1940, he started his own law practice, and in 1943, together with other Hindus, he founded the association Djagaran Will. In 1947, Lachmon was one of the founders and forerunner of the United Hindustani Party (VHP), the largest Hindu political party in Suriname (later renamed Progressive Reform Party). Lachmon was chairman, and retained that post until his death. In the general election of 1949, Lachmon won a seat in the Estates of Suriname, and the National Party of Suriname (NPS) took 13 of the 21 seats, enabling them to form a government. In the 1955 Suriname election, the NPS lost heavily, and Lachmon withdrew one of its candidates to back Johan Adolf Pengel, in order to give him a better chance. From 1964 to 1967 and 1969 to 1973, Lachmon served as the Chairman of the Estates of Suriname.

=== Independence ===
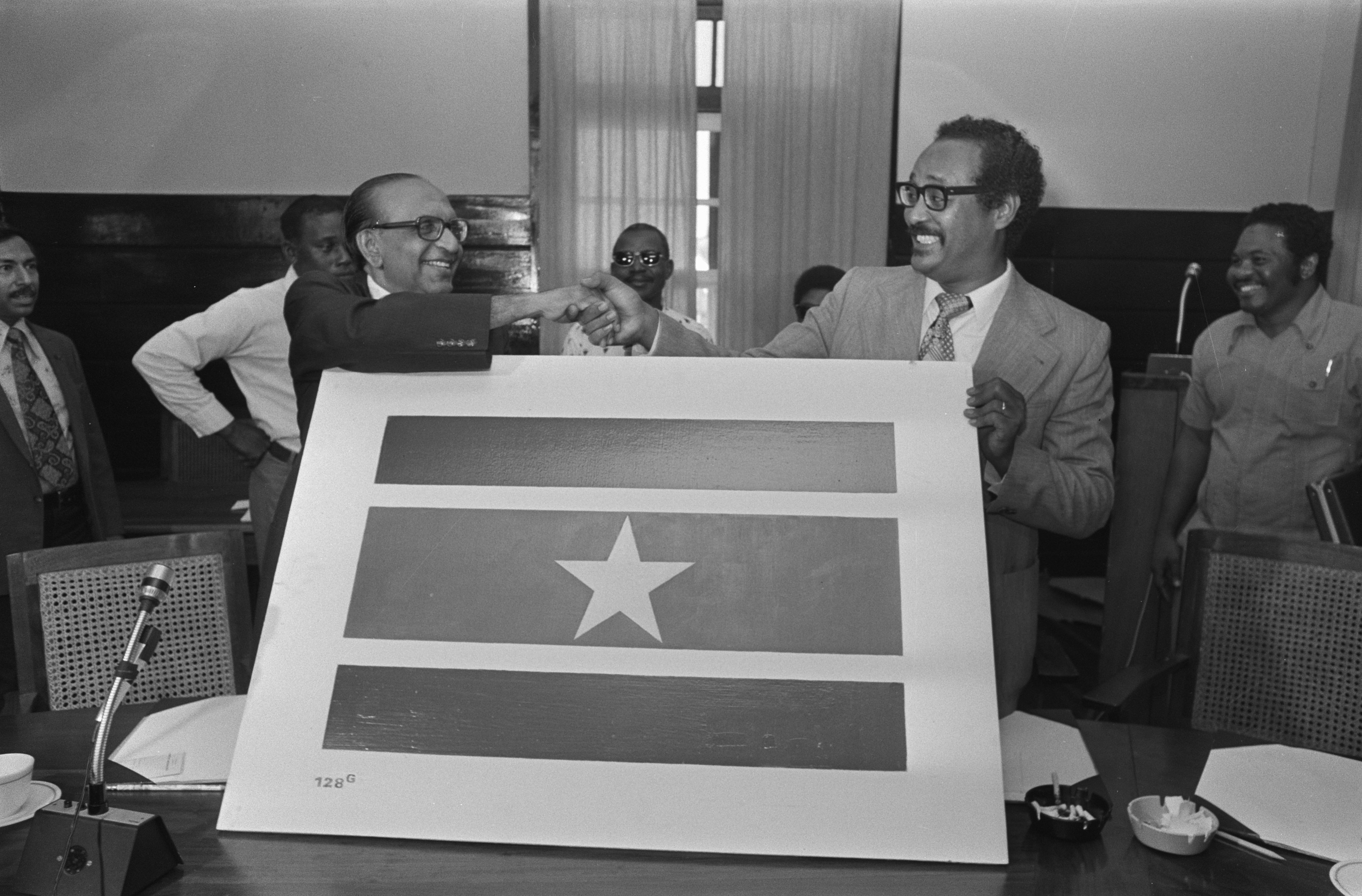
Jagernath Lachmon and Prime Minister Henck Arron with the new flag in November 1975

In February 1974, Henck Arron, the Prime Minister at the time, announced that Suriname would be granted independence from the Netherlands at the end of 1975. Lachmon was in favor of the independence of Suriname, but only in the long term against the will of Hindus. Arron's plans were too hastily for him, because he was afraid of domination of the Indians by the Afro-Creoles. The ethnic tensions in the neighboring country, Guyana (formerly British Guiana) as an example of what could occur to Suriname if the government acted with blind haste. He called for a referendum on independence, if only because that issue had played no role in the elections of 1973. Arron did not want it, and the Dutch government advised against it. In the run-up to independence, this led to severe riots erupted. Lachmon, often mockingly referred to as Lachmon van Oranje (English: Lachmon of the House of Orange), was reconciled to the idea just six days before independence. The commitment of Johan Ferrier to be the first president played an important role. On 25 November 1975, Suriname became independent.

In the period after the Sergeants' Coup in February 1980 he took the idea of bending reeds that he admired Mahatma Gandhi had promoted and that his opponents mockingly called bending with all winds. In 1987 elections could be held again, partially thanks to Lachmon's reconciliation efforts. His VHP was in the government and Lachmon was chairman of the National Assembly. In total, he was the chairman of the National Assembly five times between 1987 and 2001. In June 1999 he was in the Guinness Book of Records as the longest-serving parliamentarian in the world.

=== Death ===
Lachmon died in a hotel room in The Hague, during an official visit to the Dutch government as chairman of a parliamentary delegation. On 25 October 2001 he was cremated in Paramaribo. In order to emphasize good relationships with the NPS, the body went not only to the VHP-party office, but also to that of the NPS. Lachmon was succeeded as president by Ram Sardjoe. Lachmon was married to Fawziya A.L. Abdul Sovan.

A statue of Lachmon is situated on the Onafhankelijkheidsplein (Independence Square). In 2012, a bust of Lachmon was placed in Nieuw-Nickerie. At Kwakoe, the annual Summer Festival in Amsterdam, the "Kwakoe Jagernath Lachmon Award" is awarded to Surinamese who have been commendable in social or cultural areas.
