= Johan Adolf Pengel =

Surinamese politician (1916–1970)

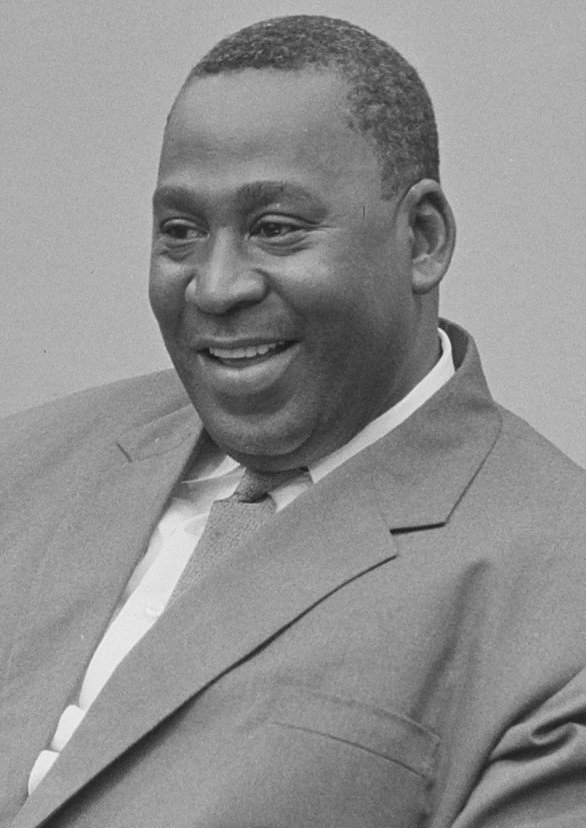
- Pengel in 1963

Prime Minister of Suriname
- In office 30 June 1963 – 5 March 1969
- Monarch: Juliana
- Preceded by: Severinus Desiré Emanuels
- Succeeded by: Jules Sedney

Member of the Estates of Suriname
- In office 1949–1970

Personal details
- Born: 20 January 1916 Paramaribo, Suriname
- Died: 5 June 1970 (aged 54) Paramaribo, Suriname
- Party: National Party of Suriname
- Profession: Politician, trade unionist
- Nickname(s): Jopie, Penpen

Johan Adolf "Jopie" Pengel (20 January 1916 – 5 June 1970) was a Surinamese politician, and prime minister of Suriname from 30 June 1963 to 5 March 1969 for the National Party of Suriname (NPS).

== Biography ==
Pengel was born in Paramaribo on 20 January 1916. He went to law school, but did not graduate. Van Dijck owned a large parcel of ground close to Pengel's home which was rented to poor Afro and Indo-Surinamese people, and started to demand large rent increases. Pengel started a protest movement against Van Dijck, and managed to raise enough money to buy the land.

In 1949, he joined the National Party of Suriname, and was elected to the Estates of Suriname. He became one of the most influential politicians in Suriname at that time. In 1952, he became chairman of General Alliance of Labour Unions in Suriname. In 1955, he was elected Chairman of the Estates of Suriname.

In 1955, the NPS, led by Pengel and the United Hindustani Party (VHP), the largest Hindu party led by Jagernath Lachmon, fashioned a coalition which successfully took power in 1958, and held it until 1967, allowing both the groups to understand each other. In 1958, Pengel was formateur of the Emanuels government, however he decided to remain party leader and not take part in the government.

In 1963, Pengel was elected Prime Minister of Suriname. Under Pengel's government, the Surinamese infrastructure was strongly developed. Roads were constructed and existing infrastructure was strongly improved. Two new hospitals were built. In 1967, he was re-elected and also served as Minister of General Affair, Interior and Finance. The States General of the Netherlands was of the opinion that Pengel's government was spending too much money, and cut development aid. This caused strikes which led to the downfall of his government in 1969.

Pengel died of sepsis on 5 June 1970, at the age of 54 in Paramaribo.

== Legacy ==
Pengel owned a country residence in Carolina on the Blackwatra Creek. Artificial rapids were constructed in the creek to give the impression of a bubble bath. After his death, it was turned into the Blaka Watra recreation area.

Pengel was a collector of animals. When he received lions in 1966, he thought it would be better to build a zoo. In 1972, the Paramaribo Zoo opened.

In 1974, a statue of Pengel was revealed on Onafhankelijkheidsplein. The statue was created by Stuart Robles de Medina.

In 1990, the main airport at Zanderij was renamed Johan Adolf Pengel International Airport.
