= National Party of Suriname =

Political party in Suriname

National Party of Suriname Nationale Partij Suriname
- Abbreviation: NPS
- Leader: Gregory Rusland
- Founded: 29 September 1946; 79 years ago
- Ideology: Social democracy Third Way; Historical: Surinamese independence
- Political position: Centre-left
- National affiliation: V7 (2015); New Front for Democracy and Development (formerly)
- Colours: Green
- National Assembly: 6 / 51

Website
- https://www.npssuriname.com

The National Party of Suriname (Dutch: Nationale Partij Suriname, NPS) is a political party in Suriname, founded in 1946, and since June 2012 led by Gregory Rusland. For a long time it was the largest ruling party in the country, and it has been in government for a total of over 40 years. Of the 16 general elections held in Suriname, the party or a coalition it was a leading part of finished in first place 11 times. The party tends to be more popular among Afro-Surinamese and multiracial people.

At the 2005 legislative elections, the party was part of the New Front for Democracy and Development that won 41.2% of the popular vote and 23 out of 51 seats in the National Assembly.

In 1993, Ronald Venetiaan became party leader. Since that time, the NPS witnessed a decline in the elections that followed. In June 2012, Venetiaan stepped down from party leadership. Party elections were held for his successor with Gregory Rusland winning seven out of eleven districts, and Ivan Fernald winning four. Under Rusland's leadership, the party has adopted some elements of the Third Way into its ideology and moved slightly closer to the political centre.

In the 2020 elections, the NPS won 3 of the 51 seats.

== Electoral results ==
Election year	No. of overall seats won	% of seats	Votes	+/–	Government
1949	13 / 21	61.9		▲12	Coalition
1951	13 / 21	61.9			Coalition
1955	2 / 21	9.5		▼11	Opposition
1958	9 / 21	42.9		▲7	Coalition
1963	14 / 36	38.9		▲5	Coalition
1967	17 / 39	43.6	61,085	▲3	Coalition
1969	11 / 39	28.2	55,482	▼6	Opposition
1973	13 / 39	33.3		▲2	Coalition
1977	15 / 39	38.5		▲2	Coalition
1987	15 / 51	29.4			Coalition
1991	12 / 51	23.5		▼2	Coalition
1996	9 / 51	17.6		▼3	Opposition (Note: The NDP alleged fraud and a lack of free and fair conditions. As a result, the New Front for Democracy and Development disintegrated and eventually 29 legislators joined under the control of the coalition led by the NDP.)
2000	16 / 51	29.4		▲7	Coalition
2005	8 / 51	15.7	35,457	▼8	Coalition
2010	4 / 51	7.8	29,452	▼4	Opposition
2015	2 / 51	3.9	16,049	▼2	Opposition
2020	3 / 51	5.9	32,394	▲1	Coalition
2025	6 / 51	11.8	31,215	▲3	Coalition

== Representation ==
=== Members of the Santokhi Cabinet (2020) ===
Ministers	Party	Portfolio
Marie Levens	NPS	Education, Science & Culture
Silvano Tjong-Ahin	NPS	Spatial Planning and Environment

=== Members of the Third Venetiaan Cabinet (2005–2010) ===
Ministers	Party	Portfolio
Ronald Venetiaan	NPS	President
Lygia Kraag-Keteldijk	NPS	Foreign Affairs
Ivan Fernald	NPS	Defense
Humphrey Hildenberg	NPS	Finance
Gregory Rusland	NPS	Natural Resources

=== Members of the Second Venetiaan Cabinet (2000–2005) ===
Ministers	Party	Portfolio
Ronald Venetiaan	NPS	President
Marie Levens	NPS	Foreign Affairs
Ronald Assen	NPS	Defense
Humphrey Hildenberg	NPS	Finance
Franco Demon	NPS	Natural Resources
Romeo van Russel	NPS	Regional Development

=== Members of the First Venetiaan Cabinet (1991–1996) ===
Ministers	Party	Portfolio
Ronald Venetiaan	NPS	President
Eddy Sedoc (acting) Rudi Roseval Eddy Sedoc (acting) Humphrey Hildenberg	NPS	Finance
Harold Pollack Franco Demon	NPS	Natural Resources
Rufus Nooitmeer Romeo van Russel	NPS	Regional Development
Cor Pigot Gerard Hiwat	NPS	Education
Eddy Sedoc Ronald Assen	NPS	Planning and Development Cooperation

=== Members of the Shankar Cabinet (1988–1990) ===
Ministers	Party	Portfolio
Henck Arron	NPS	Vice President and Planning
Eddy Sedoc	NPS	Foreign Affairs
Ronald Venetiaan	NPS	Education
Romeo van Russel	NPS	Labour
Elfriede Alexander-Vanenburg	NPS	Internal Affairs
Wilfred Grep	NPS	Transport, Trade and Industry

=== Members of the Radhakishun Cabinet (1986–1987) and the First Wijdenbosch Cabinet (1987–1988) ===
Ministers	Party	Portfolio
Harry Kensmil	NPS	Natural Resources and Energy
Arthy Jessurun	NPS	Public Health
Wilhelm Wolfram	NPS	Public Works, Telecommunications and Construction

=== Members of the Second Arron cabinet (1977–1980) ===
Ministers	Party	Portfolio
Henck Arron	NPS	Prime minister and Foreign Affairs
Olton van Genderen	NPS	Internal Affairs
Lesley Goede	NPS	Finance
Ronald Venetiaan	NPS	Education
Michael Cambridge	NPS	Construction
Achmed Karamat Ali	NPS	Public Works and Traffic

=== Members of the First Arron cabinet (1973–1977) ===
Ministers	Party	Portfolio
Henck Arron	NPS	Prime minister and Finance
Olton van Genderen	NPS	District Administration and Decentralization
Ronald Venetiaan	NPS	Education
Michael Cambridge	NPS	Construction
Achmed Karamat Ali	NPS	Public Works and Traffic
