= List of deputy prime ministers of Suriname =

Deputy Prime Minister of Suriname
- Vice-minister-president van Suriname
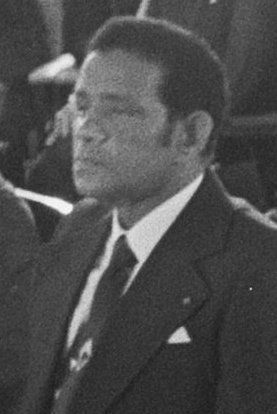
- Longest serving officeholder Olton van Genderen; 24 December 1973 – 25 February 1980
- Status: Deputy prime minister
- Member of: Cabinet of Suriname
- Reports to: Prime Minister of Suriname
- Seat: Paramaribo
- Nominator: Prime Minister of Suriname
- Formation: 25 June 1958; 68 years ago
- First holder: Alfred Morpurgo
- Final holder: Harry Kensmil
- Abolished: 25 January 1988; 38 years ago
- Succession: Deputy Vice President of Suriname

The Deputy Prime Minister of Suriname (Dutch: Vice-minister-president van Suriname) was a title given to a member of the Cabinet of Ministers of Suriname between 1954 and 1988, often to recognize members of other parties in the ruling coalition. The deputy prime minister served as acting prime minister in the absence of the Prime Minister of Suriname.

This position was abolished when the current Constitution of Suriname went into effect in 1988; however, its functions were continued in the extra-constitutional position of Deputy Vice President (Dutch: Vice-voorzitter van de ministerraad) from 1988 to 1990.

== List of officeholders ==
Progressive Surinamese People's Party (PSV)
Progressive Reform Party (VHP)
National Party of Suriname (NPS)
Nationalist Republican Party (PNR)
Progressive Workers' and Farmers' Union (PALU)
February 25th Movement (VFB)
Party for National Unity and Solidarity (KTPI)
Independent

=== Part of the Netherlands (–1975) ===
| No. | Portrait | Name (Birth–Death) | Portfolio | Term of office | | | Political party | Cabinet | Ref. |
| No. | Portrait | Name (Birth–Death) | Portfolio | Took office | Left office | Time in office | Political party | Cabinet | Ref. |
Suriname (constituent country of the Kingdom of the Netherlands)
Vacant (16 December 1954 – 25 June 1958)
| 1 | | Alfred Morpurgo (1899–1973) | Minister of Education and Population Development | 25 June 1958 | 30 June 1963 | 5 years, 5 days | PSV | Emanuels | |
| 2 | | Sewraam Rambaran Mishre (1915–1964) | Minister of Justice and Police | 30 June 1963 | 15 February 1964 (Note: Died in office.) | 230 days | VHP | Pengel I | |
| 3 | | Johan Kraag (1913–1996) | Minister of Social Affairs | 15 February 1964 | 15 March 1967 | 3 years, 28 days | NPS | Pengel I | |
| 3 | | Johan Kraag (1913–1996) | Minister of Employment and Social Affairs | 15 March 1967 | 5 March 1969 | 1 year, 355 days | NPS | Pengel II | |
Vacant (5 March 1969 – 20 November 1969)
| 4 | | Harry Radhakishun (1921–1983) | Minister of Finance | 20 November 1969 | 24 December 1973 | 4 years, 34 days | VHP | Sedney | |
| 5 | | Olton van Genderen (1921–1990) | Minister of District Administration and Decentralisation | 24 December 1973 | 25 November 1975 | 1 year, 336 days | NPS | Arron I | |

=== Independence (1975–) ===
==== Deputy prime ministers of Suriname (1975–1988) ====
| No. | Portrait | Name (Birth–Death) | Portfolio | Term of office | | | Political party | Cabinet | Ref. |
| No. | Portrait | Name (Birth–Death) | Portfolio | Took office | Left office | Time in office | Political party | Cabinet | Ref. |
Republic of Suriname
| 1 | | Olton van Genderen (1921–1990) | Minister of District Administration and Decentralisation | 25 November 1975 | 28 December 1977 | 2 years, 33 days | NPS | Arron I | |
| 1 | | Olton van Genderen (1921–1990) | Minister of the Interior | 28 December 1977 | 25 February 1980 (Note: Deposed in the Sergeants' Coup.) | 2 years, 59 days | NPS | Arron II | |
Vacant (25 February 1980 – 15 August 1980)
| 2 | | André Haakmat (1939–2024) | Minister of Foreign Affairs and Justice and Police | 15 August 1980 | 7 January 1981 (Note: Dismissed by Bouterse.) | 145 days | PNR | Chin A Sen | |
Vacant (7 January 1981 – 31 March 1982)
| 3 | | Harvey Naarendorp (born 1940) | Minister of Foreign Affairs | 31 March 1982 | 9 December 1982 (Note: Resigned following the December murders.) | 253 days | Independent | Neijhorst | |
| 4 | | Winston Caldeira (born 1941) | Minister of Finance and Planning | 26 February 1983 | 8 January 1984 (Note: Dismissed by Bouterse.) | 317 days | PALU | Alibux | |
| 5 | | Frank Leeflang (1936–2024) | Minister of the Interior and Justice | 3 February 1984 | 26 June 1985 (Note: Resigned after cabinet reshuffle.) | 1 year, 143 days | VFB | Udenhout | |
Vacant (26 June 1985 – 17 July 1986)
| 6 | | Jules Wijdenbosch (1941–2025) | Minister of the Interior, District Government and People's Mobilization, and Justice | 17 July 1986 | 7 April 1987 | 264 days | VFB | Radhakishun | |
| 7 | | Harry Kensmil (1932–2012) | Minister of Natural Resources and Energy | 7 April 1987 | 25 January 1988 | 293 days | NPS | Wijdenbosch I | |

==== Deputy Vice President of Suriname (1988–1990) ====
| No. | Portrait | Name (Birth–Death) | Portfolio | Term of office | | | Political party | Cabinet | Ref. |
| No. | Portrait | Name (Birth–Death) | Portfolio | Took office | Left office | Time in office | Political party | Cabinet | Ref. |
|---|---|---|---|---|---|---|---|---|---|
| 1 | | Willy Soemita (1936–2022) | Minister of Social Affairs and Housing | 25 January 1988 | 24 December 1990 (Note: Deposed in the Telephone Coup.) | 2 years, 333 days | KTPI | Shankar | |

== See also ==
- Politics of Suriname
- List of prime ministers of Suriname
- List of colonial governors of Suriname
- President of Suriname
- First Lady of Suriname
- Vice President of Suriname
