= 1983 Suriname bauxite strike =

1983-84 strike by bauxite miners in Suriname

- Location: Suriname
- Methods: Strike action, protest

Bauxite miners in Suriname went on general strike from December 1983 to February 1984. The strike was in protest of tax increases, following a series of murders that happened 3 years before.

== Background ==
Bauxite is a type of sedimentary rock that contains high levels of aluminium. Bauxite mining is one of the planet's single largest sources of aluminium. Bauxite mining was a major source of economic activity in the South American country of Suriname during the 20th century. Major bauxite companies in Suriname in the early 1980s included the Suriname Aluminum Company, a subsidiary of the Aluminum Company of America, and the Billiton Corporation, a subsidiary of the Royal Dutch Shell Company.

In 1975, Suriname obtained its independence from the Netherlands. Between 1980 and 1987, Suriname was ruled by the National Military Council under Dési Bouterse, who took power in the 1980 Surinamese coup d'état. In December 1982, 15 opposition leaders were murdered by the dictatorship after organising strikes and protests for a return to democracy. In the aftermath of the murders, most major donors of foreign aid to Suriname broke off ties with the government, including the United States and the Netherlands. Aid from the latter comprised as much as one third of the Surinamese government budget.

== History ==
=== Prelude ===
In February 1983, Errol Alibux was appointed Prime Minister under Bouterse. Under Alibux, the Surinamese government undertook an austerity-based economic programme aimed at securing a 100 million dollar loan from the International Monetary Fund. As part of this programme, the government announced a series of tax increases to take effect on 1 January 1984, including on taxes on imported goods, Christmas bonuses, and income tax.

While the first anniversary of the December murders passed relatively peacefully, the last few months of 1983 would bring a range of unrest to Suriname, including discontent over the economic programme, a major diplomatic schism with Cuba, and allegations of a coup attempt.

=== Strike ===
In late December 1983, 4,000 bauxite miners launched a strike against the government's economic programme, demanding that the government cancel the planned tax increases. The striking miners were quickly joined by workers in aluminium smelters, and electric workers at the Afobaka Dam shut off power to the capital.

Bouterse accused exiled dissidents, including former Surinamese president Henk Chin A Sen, of inciting the strike. On 28 December, the Surinamese government accused the striking workers of sabotaging electric transmission lines.

Fred Derby, the leader of the Progressive Labour Federation 47 who had been arrested in December 1982, but was the only one to be released without being murdered, had little influence over the strike due to suspicions over his release despite the bauxite workers belonging to the Progressive Labour Federation 47.

On 6 January, electric workers would once again cut off power to the capital, oerpowering soldiers guarding the electric facilities. On 11 January, the Surinamese military attempted to occupy a Suriname Aluminum Company facility near Paramaribo, but were pushed back by the striking workers.

=== Resolution ===
According to the Inter-American Commission on Human Rights, the strike "convinced the military it could not rule without the participation and cooperation of the key sectors of the society." The strike ended after Bouterse agreed to reverse several of the economic measures and fired Alibux as Prime Minister, replacing him with Wim Udenhout. Udenhout would announce a new cabinet on 3 February 1984 composed of five military ministers, and two each from the private sector and trade unions, and issued Decree A-15 which called for the establishment of "permanent democratic structures."
