= List of ambassadors of Suriname to the United States =

Coordinates: 38.944836°N 77.063038°W

Ambassador of Suriname to the United States
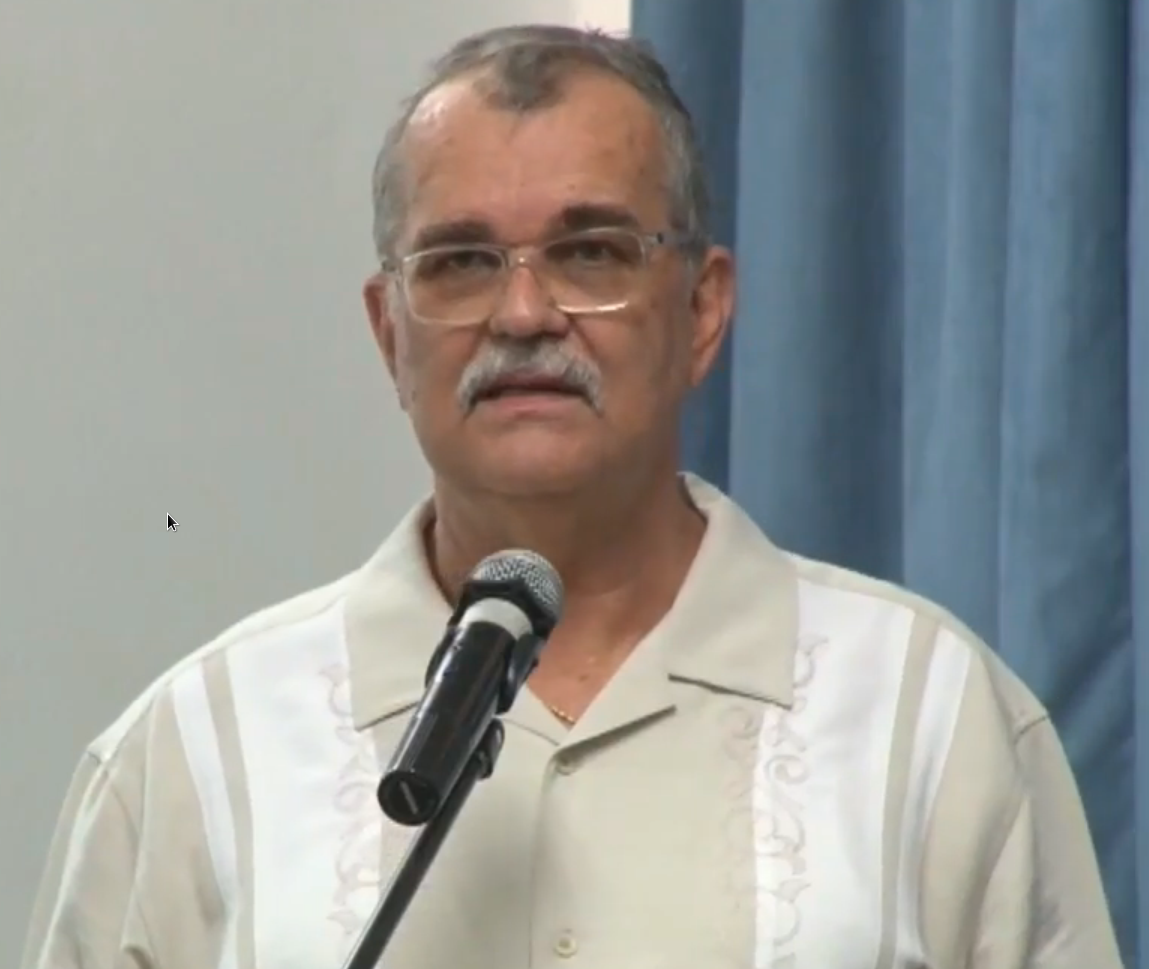
- Incumbent; Marten Schalkwijk since March 7, 2022
- Inaugural holder: Roel Faried Karamat
- Formation: November 30, 1976

The Surinamese Ambassador in Washington, D. C. is the official representative of the Government in Paramaribo to the Government of the United States.

== List of representatives ==
diplomatic agreement/designated	Diplomatic accreditation	Ambassador	Observations	President of Suriname	List of presidents of the United States	Term end
November 24, 1975			The governments in Washington, D. C. and Paramaribo established diplomatic relations.	Johan Ferrier	Gerald Ford	
October 7, 1976	November 30, 1976	Roel Faried Karamat	His entire career has been in service of the Kingdom of the Netherlands' ministry of foreign affairs.; Ambassador Karamat with his late wife, Elisabeth H. Schönborn-Buchheim, who was Austrian, lived in Switzerland with their 5 children.	Johan Ferrier	Gerald Ford	
July 25, 1980		Rudy E. Van Bochove	Chargé d'affaires	Henk Chin A Sen	Jimmy Carter	
April 6, 1981	June 4, 1981	Henricus Augustinus Franciscus Heidweiller		Henk Chin A Sen	Ronald Reagan	
August 13, 1984	August 29, 1984	Donald Aloysius McLeod		Ramdat Misier	Ronald Reagan	
February 2, 1986	February 18, 1986	Arnold Theodoor Halfhide		Ramdat Misier	Ronald Reagan	
May 10, 1989	May 11, 1989	Willem Alfred Udenhout		Ramsewak Shankar	George H. W. Bush	
May 23, 1997	September 8, 1997	Arnold Theodoor Halfhide		Jules Albert Wijdenbosch	Bill Clinton	
October 10, 2001	October 10, 2001	Henry Lothar Illes		Ronald Venetiaan	George W. Bush	
February 22, 2007	February 27, 2007	Jacques Ruben Constantijn Kross		Ronald Venetiaan	George W. Bush	
January 28, 2011	February 23, 2011	Subhas Chandra Mungra		Desi Bouterse	Barack Obama	July 2020
June 9, 2017	July 21, 2017	Niermala Badrising		Desi Bouterse	Donald Trump	July 2020
	March 7, 2022	Marten Schalkwijk		Chandrikapersad Santokhi	Joe Biden	

== See also ==
- Suriname–United States relations
