= Henry Neijhorst =

Former Surinamese Prime Minister

Prime Minister of Suriname
- In office 31 March 1982 – 9 December 1982
- President: Fred Ramdat Misier
- Preceded by: Henk Chin A Sen
- Succeeded by: Errol Alibux

Minister of Finance
- In office 15 March 1980 – 15 August 1980
- Prime Minister: Henk Chin A Sen
- Preceded by: Lesley Goede
- Succeeded by: Marcel Chehin

Personal details
- Born: Henry Roëll Neijhorst; 7 January 1940 (age 86)
- Party: Independent
- Spouse: 1
- Children: 4
- Education: Tilburg University
- Occupation: Economist

Henry Roëll Neijhorst (also Neyhorst; born 7 January 1940) is a Surinamese economist who served as Prime Minister of Suriname from 31 March to 9 December 1982. He also served as Minister of Finance from 15 March to 15 August 1980.

== Education and early career ==
Neijhorst studied economics at the University of Amsterdam and the School of Economics in Rotterdam, eventually receiving his drs. in economics from the Catholic University of Tilburg in 1972. During his studies, he was active in the Nationalist Student Movement, an organisation of Surinamese students in the Netherlands.

== Cabinet ==
When Henk Chin A Sen became Prime Minister after the 1980 Sergeants' Coup, he chose Neijhorst as his Finance Minister. Neijhorst at the time had been serving as the economic director of the National Development Bank. After the serving Minister of Economic Planning was dismissed in June, Neijhorst took over that position as well. However, when President Ferrier was forced by the military to resign in August, Neijhorst voluntarily resigned from the Cabinet soon after. He was the basis for a fictional Finance Minister in Joop van den Broek's 1981 novel Afrekening in Paramaribo (Settling in Paramaribo).

After his resignation, Neijhorst became a member of the Committee for Netherlands-Suriname Cooperation. He also joined the Surinaams Postspaarbank (Surinamese Postal Savings Bank) as a director.

In March 1982, Neijhorst was jointly appointed as Prime Minister and acting Finance Minister to succeed Chin A Sen. He was part of the four-member Policy Centre, a governing body whose other members were Foreign Minister Harvey Naarendorp, Military Council Chairman Desi Bouterse, and Military Council Vice-Chairman Roy Horb. In theory, the Policy Centre would provide a buffer between the National Military Council and the civilian Cabinet of Ministers. However, Neijhorst and the rest of the Cabinet chose to resign after the National Military Council unilaterally decided to eliminate opposition leaders.

In 1991, Neijhorst became an economic advisor to the Venetiaan government.

== Later career ==
Neijhorst contributed photographs of 1960's sports teams to The First Surinamese Sports Encyclopaedia (1893-1988). He also edited a 1998 volume of articles by Jnan Adhin. In honor of Humphrey Mijnals' eightieth birthday (2010), Neijhorst published a tribute brochure in cooperation with the Surinamese Football Association. Neijhorst drew attention to Mijnals' pioneering records: one of the first foreign players in Brazilian football and the first nonwhite captain of USV Elinkwijk.

Political offices
Preceded by Hendrik Rudolf Chin A Sen	Prime Minister of Suriname; 1982	Succeeded by Liakat Ali Errol Alibux
