= National Military Council (Suriname) =

1980–1987 ruling military junta of Suriname

Republic of Suriname Republiek Suriname (Dutch)
- 1980–1987
- Flag Coat of arms
- Official languages: Dutch
- Government: Socialist military junta
- Chairman
  - 1980-1987: Dési Bouterse
- History
  - 1980 Surinamese coup d'état: 25 February 1980
  - 1987 Surinamese general election: 25 November 1987
- ISO 3166 code: SR
Preceded by	Succeeded by
Republic of Suriname	Republic of Suriname

The National Military Council (Dutch: Nationale Militaire Raad, NMR) was the ruling military junta of Suriname between the 1980 Sergeants' Coup and the 1987 general election. The council was chaired by Dési Bouterse.

== History ==
Formed immediately following the Sergeants' Coup, the NMR initially consisted of the following eight military officers:

- Dési Bouterse (sergeant major)
- Roy Horb (sergeant)
- Ramon Abrahams (sergeant)
- Stanley Joemman (sergeant)
- Chas Mijnals (sergeant)
- Laurens Neede (sergeant)
- Michel van Rey (first lieutenant)
- Badrissein Sital (sergeant major)

Sital became chairman of the NMR, although Bouterse (the new commander of the Suriname National Army) soon emerged as the strongman. Of these eight, only Horb and Bouterse had actually participated in the coup as members of the "Group of Sixteen" (Dutch: Groep van Zestien). Abrahams, Neede and Sital had been arrested for forming a military union and were at that time imprisoned in the Memre Boekoe barracks. Politicians from mainly left-wing (splinter) parties acted as advisers: Eddy Bruma, Frank Leeflang, Fred Derby (PNR), Rubin Lie Pauw Sam (VP), Iwan Krolis (PALU) and Henk Herrenberg (SPS).

The NMR appointed Henk Chin A Sen as the new prime minister on March 15, 1980, with André Haakmat appointed as the deputy prime minister on August 15, 1980. Negotiations were held with the then president Johan Ferrier, resulting in the preservation of the democratic legal order and the existing constitution; Ferrier then stayed on as president, before he was eventually ousted on August 15, 1980.

The NMR's course was moderate at first, although several wings developed. On September 15, 1980, the 'left wing' consisting of Mijnals (member of the RVP), Sital and Joemman were arrested and sentenced to several years in prison on conspiracy charges. Hereafter, Bouterse also turned to the left, with the result that the three were released after a few months. Sital was appointed Minister of Health, while Mijnals and Joemman were given important posts in the army. Bouterse's change of course was partly prompted by the increasing influence of Haakmat, who was therefore relieved of his post on January 7, 1981.

The NMR's socialist course, strengthening its links with Cuba, Grenada (under the PRG) and Nicaragua (under the FSLN), was one of the reasons for massive protests and strikes during 1982, which would eventually lead to the December murders. Grenada's prime minister Maurice Bishop is said to have played an important role in this, according to several sources, by inciting Bouterse to take firm action.

After the December murders, the NMR continued until general election was held on November 25, 1987. Incidentally, after the execution of Bishop and the United States invasion of Grenada in October 1983, Bouterse had abandoned his left course and expelled all Cuban advisers from the country. After the 1987 general election, Bouterse remained army leader until 1988.

== See also ==
- History of Suriname
