= Winston Caldeira =

Surinamese politician

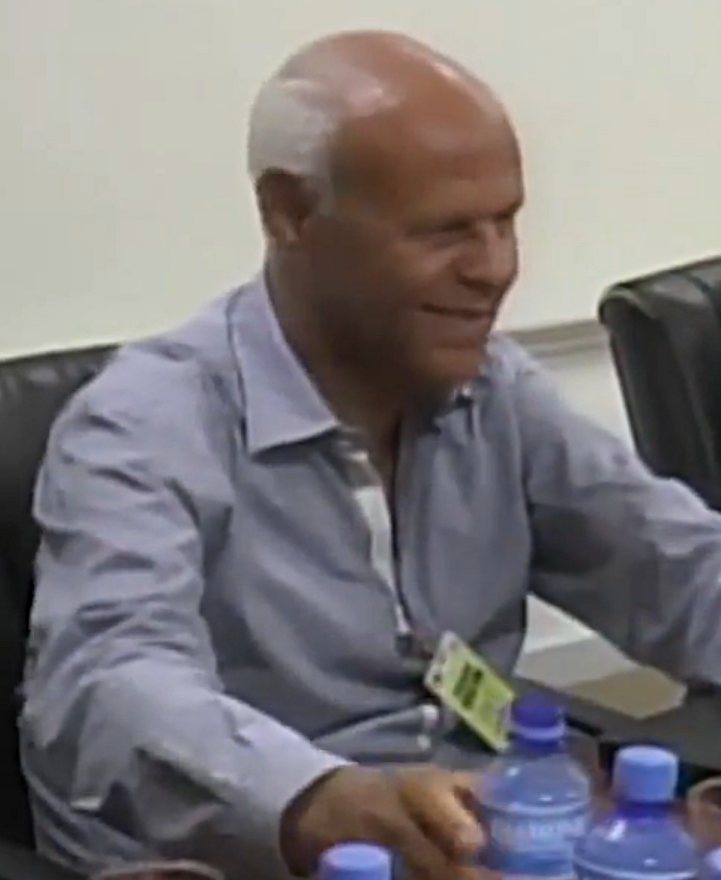
- Caldeira in 2016

Deputy Prime Minister of Suriname
- In office 26 February 1983 – 8 January 1984
- Prime Minister: Errol Alibux
- Preceded by: Harvey Naarendorp
- Succeeded by: Frank Leeflang

Personal details
- Born: Winston Ramon Caldeira; 4 June 1941 (age 84) Paramaribo, Suriname
- Party: Progressive Workers' and Farmers' Union
- Occupation: Politician, consultant

Winston Ramon Caldeira (born 4 June 1941) is a Surinamese politician and consultant. A member of the Progressive Workers' and Farmers' Union, he served as the Deputy Prime Minister of Suriname and Minister of Finance and Planning from 1983 to 1984.

From December 1983 to January 1984, a major strike took place in Suriname. This was initially directed against tax increases, but later also against the cabinet Alibux and the military regime of Dési Bouterse. On January 7, 1984, the cabinet was dissolved, which ended Caldeira's ministry.

In later years, he has been active as an advisor to the Surinamese government, among others. In 2010, he became a consultant for the Inter-American Development Bank.

Caldeira was suspected of involvement in the December murders, but was acquitted on 29 November 2019.
