= Lilian Gonçalves-Ho Kang You =

Surinamese-Dutch human rights activist

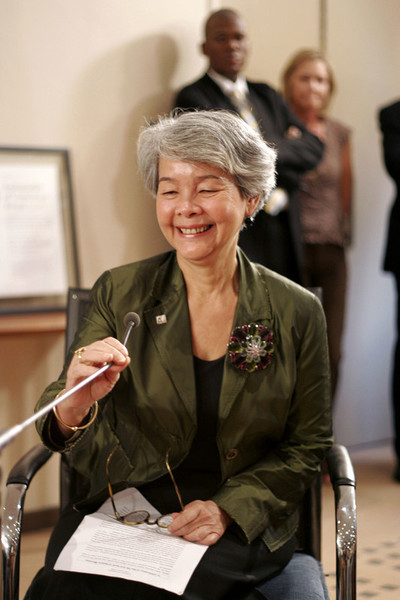
- Ho Kang You (2006)
- Born: Lilian Ho Kang You; 11 November 1946 (age 80); Paramaribo
- Occupation: human rights activist

Lilian Gonçalves-Ho Kang You (born 11 November 1946) is a Surinamese human rights activist who lives and works in The Netherlands.

== Early years and education ==
Gonçalves was born as Lilian Ho Kang You in Paramaribo. Her father, a dentist, was from a Chinese Surinamese indentured laborers' family. Her mother had French, African and Portuguese-Sephardi Jewish ancestors. After her high school education in Paramaribo, she left to The Netherlands to study law at Leiden University. After her graduation in 1970, she returned to Suriname and started working for Jules Sedney's government. In this role, she met her future husband Kenneth Gonçalves, whom she married in 1977 and they jointly working in their own law practice.

== Surinamese coup d'état ==
On 25 February 1980, a group of 16 sergeants of the Surinamese Armed Forces (SKM) led by Dési Bouterse overthrew the government of Prime Minister Henck Arron with a violent coup d'état, known as the 1980 Surinamese coup d'état or the Sergeants' Coup.

Both Gonçalves-Ho Kang You and her husband publicly spoke out about the injustices and the lack of democracy. Shortly after the coup, her brother Milton Ho Kang You was found dead in his garage. It has been speculated that he was shot by the military, however his murder was never solved. Her husband was arrested and killed on 8 December 1982 during the December murders.

== Later career ==
After her husband's murder, Gonçalves-Ho Kang You continued her law practice. However, for safety reasons she decided in 1983 to emigrate to the Netherlands with her daughter. She worked as a lawyer, and was active for the Dutch national bureau against racism (landelijk bureau racismebestrijding) and development aid organisations. From 1994 to 2000, she was vice-president of the Dutch Equal Treatment Commission. From 1997 to 2006, Gonçalves-Ho Kang You was a member of the Onafhankelijke Post en Telecommunicatie Autoriteit (English: Independent Post and Telecommunications Authority), an independent government agency charged with enforcing Dutch law on telecommunication, post and cable TV services. From 2001 to 2005, she was the president of the Dutch branch of Amnesty International, for which she received an award from the Nederlandse Juristen-Vereniging in 2005. In September 2006, she was elected president of the International Executive Committee of Amnesty International, but she was not re-elected to this position. She remained a committee member until 2009. In 2009 Gonçalves-Ho Kang You became a member of the Council of State (Netherlands).

On 7 October 2020, the Dutch Council for Culture presented the recommendation 'Colonial Collection and a Recognition of Injustice' to the Dutch culture minister. This recommendation was written by the Advisory Committee on the National Policy Framework for Colonial Collections, of which Gonçalves-Ho Kang You was chairperson. The recommendation was to return objects unconditionally when the country of origin requests so.

== Awards and honors ==
In 2007, Gonçalves-Ho Kang You gave the 13th Mandeville-lecture at Erasmus University Rotterdam. In 2008, the University of Groningen awarded her the Aletta Jacobsprijs, for her social involvement and efforts in the field of human rights and women's rights. In 2015, she received an honorary doctorate from Leiden University. In 2020 she received the Gouden Zandloper Oeuvreprijs which recognizes excellence in the legal profession.
