= Jennifer van Dijk-Silos =

Surinamese politician

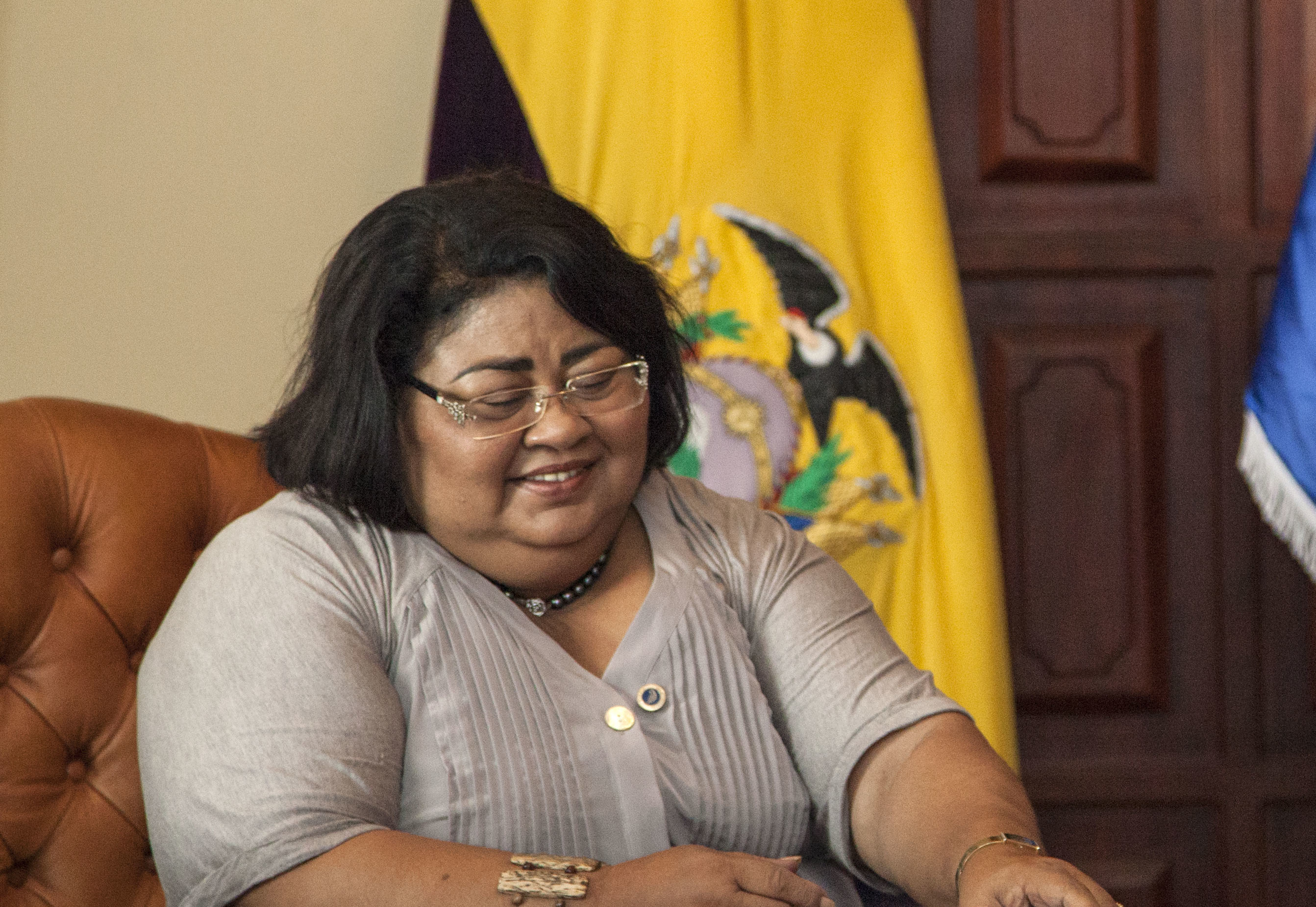
- Van Dijk-Silos, 2013

Minister of Justice and Police
- In office 12 August 2015 – 23 March 2017
- President: Dési Bouterse
- Preceded by: Edward Belfort
- Succeeded by: Ferdinand Welzijn (interim)

Personal details
- Born: 13 December 1954 (age 71) Suriname
- Party: National Democratic Party

Jennifer Victorine van Dijk-Silos (born 13 December 1954) is a Surinamese politician of the National Democratic Party. She was Minister of Justice and Police between August 2015 and March 2017. Van Dijk-Silos served as chair of the Onafhankelijk Kiesbureau (Independent Electoral Commission) between 2004 and 2015 and once more from 2018 to 2020.

== Career ==
Van-Dijk Silos was born on 13 December 1954 in Suriname. Van Dijk-Silos was chair of the Onafhankelijk Kiesbureau (Independent Electoral Commission) between 2004 and 2015 before she was appointed minister. She also had her own law firm, which she transferred to her daughter. In August 2015 Van Dijk-Silos was appointed Minister of Justice and Police. She succeeded Edward Belfort.

On 7 July 2016 the opposition parties Democratic Alternative '91 and Surinamese Labour Party, demanded the resignation of Van Dijk-Silos due to comments she had made about the trial over the December murders. The next day more parliamentarians joined the call. Van Dijk-Silos reacted by first saying she had no message to the calls for her resignation and subsequently that the opposition parliamentarians had lied in their letter to President Dési Bouterse. In 2017 Van Dijk-Silos started consultations for the recognition of LGBTQ rights.

On 21 March 2017 Van Dijk-Silos was asked to resign by President Dési Bouterse, he cited her troublesome relations with the judicial power as reason. Judges of the High Court of Justice of Suriname earlier withdrew support for her in a letter, stating that she was "impossible to communicate and cooperate with". Van Dijk-Silos refused to resign and she was subsequently relieved of her position with honor by Bouterse. On 23 March 2017 Van Dijk-Silos was succeeded by Ferdinand Welzijn in an interim capacity. In November 2023 she repeated her views that her sacking was unjust. She also stated to have no more political ambitions.

From 2018 Van Dijk-Silos once again served as chair of the Independent Electoral Commission. On 19 June 2020 she declared that the results of the 2020 Surinamese general election were valid, but at the same time stated that they were the worst organized elections in the last twenty years. On 26 September 2020 President Chan Santokhi replaced her as chair with Samseerali Sheikh-Alibaks.

In 2023 she launched an injunction against Chairman of the National Assembly of Suriname, Marinus Bee, to speed up the process of the amendments to the electoral arrangements. Bee replied that van Dijk-Silos handled out of revenge for the National Assembly not having supported her model.
