= Jimmy Leonard Stolk =

Surinamese murder suspect

Jimmy Leonard Stolk (born 1942) is a Surinamese former soldier, entrepreneur, and suspect in the trial about the December murders. Stolk was active as a military in the Surinamese army during the government (military dictatorship) of Dési Bouterse, and is suspected of involvement in the December Murders of 1982. Stolk was head of the prison, and member of the military tribunal.

Stolk transported one of the victims of the December Murders, the soldier Jiwansingh Sheombar, from the Memre Boekoe barracks to Fort Zeelandia in his own car; according to Stolk by command of his superiors, and for interrogation. Sheombar was shot later, together with fourteen others.

On 29 November 2019, Stolk was acquitted.
