= Ruben Rozendaal =

Surinamese soldier

- Born: 21 September 1956; Paramaribo
- Died: 1 December 2017 (aged 61)
- Known for: 1980 Surinamese coup d'état

Ruben Rozendaal (21 September 1956 – 1 December 2017) was a Surinamese soldier who was involved in the military coup of 1980 in Suriname and suspected in the December murders.

== Events ==
According to the statement of Fred Derby, union leader and the only survivor of the December murders, Rozendaal was one of the four soldiers who retrieved Derby from his home on the night of 7 to 8 December 1982.

In 2012, Rozendaal said that in the 1980s and early 1990s, Dési Bouterse supplied the FARC of Colombia with weapons in exchange for cocaine. A leaked diplomatic cable from 2006 reported a possible connection between Bouterse and the FARC. Rozendaal mentioned that:

"I saw him at half past five in the morning on December 8. (...) He lied to us that a coup would take place, and the people therefore had to be picked up. I believed him then, but in retrospect it turns out not to be true. This was not a military action, just brutal and cowardly murder. The people were taken out of bed and to Fort Zeelandia and were treated like animals."

On 30 October 2017, Rozendaal was charged with 10 years for murder. On 1 December, Rozendaal committed suicide.
