= List of ministers of Justice and Police (Suriname) =

This is a list of ministers of Justice and Police of the Republic of Suriname. Among its responsibilities, the ministry enforces human rights, provides social legal assistance, oversees policies regarding detainees, and maintains public order and peace in the country.

== List of ministers ==
Minister Title	Minister	Period	Cabinet
Justice and Police	Julius Caesar de Miranda	1948 - 1949	May (CAB)
Justice	Julius Caesar de Miranda	1949 - 1951	De Miranda
Justice and Police	Adriaan C.J.M. Alberga	1951 - 1952	Drielsma / Buiskool
Justice and Police	Emile M.L. Ensberg	1952 - 1955	Alberga / Currie
Justice and Police	M. Ashruf Karamat Ali	1955 - 1956	Ferrier
Justice and Police	Willem G.H.C.J. Smit*	1956 - 1957	Ferrier
Justice and Police	Rudolf W.A. Thurkow	1957	Ferrier
Justice and Police	Anton Favery*	1957 - 1958	Ferrier
Justice and Police	Hemradj Shriemisier	1958 - 1962	Emanuels
Justice and Police	Freek Emanuels*	1962 - 1963	Emanuels
Justice and Police	Sewraam Rambaran Mishre	1963 - 1964	Pengel-1
Justice and Police	Jnan H. Adhin	1964 - 1967	Pengel-1
Justice and Police	Fred Manichand	1967 - 1968	Pengel-2
Justice and Police	Jagdieschandre Jadnanansing	1968 - 1969	Pengel-2
Justice and Police	Ramsewak Shankar	1969	May
Justice and Police	Jnan H. Adhin	1969 - 1973	Sedney
Justice and Police	Eddy A. Hoost	1973 - 1977	Arron-1
Justice	Soerdj Badrising	1977 - 1980	Arron-2
Justice / Army and Police	René Reeder / Michel van Rey	1980	Chin A Sen
Justice / Army and Police	André Haakmat	1980 - 1981	Chin A Sen
Justice / Army and Police	Harvey H. Naarendorp	1981	Chin A Sen
Justice / Army and Police	Harvey H. Naarendorp / Laurens E. Neede	1981 - 1982	Chin A Sen
Justice / Army and Police	Frank J. Leeflang / Ivan Graanoogst	1982	Neijhorst
Justice / Army and Police	Frank J. Leeflang / Wilfred Maynard	1983 - 1984	Alibux
Justice / Army and Police	Frank J. Leeflang / Wilfred Maynard	1984 - 1985	Udenhout
Justice / Army and Police	Subhas Punwasi / Wilfred Maynard	1985 - 1986	Udenhout
Justice / Army and Police	Jules A. Wijdenbosch / Wilfred Maynard	1986 - 1987	Radhakishun
Justice / Army and Police	Siegfried A. Gilds / Wilfred Maynard	1987 - 1988	Wijdenbosch-1
Justice and Police	Jules Ajodhia	1988 - 1990	Shankar
Justice	Paul R. Sjak Shie	1991	Kraag
Justice and Police	Soeshiel K. Girjasing	1991 - 1996	Venetiaan-1
Justice and Police	Paul R. Sjak Shie	1996 - 1999	Wijdenbosch-2
Justice and Police	Yvonne Raveles-Resida [1st female]	1999 - 2000	Wijdenbosch-2
Justice and Police	Siegfried A. Gilds	2000 - 2005	Venetiaan-2
Justice and Police	Chan Santokhi	2005 - 2010	Venetiaan-3
Justice and Police	Lamuré C.A. Latour*	2010	Bouterse-1
Justice and Police	Martin Misiedjan	2010 - 2012	Bouterse-1
Justice and Police	Edward Belfort	2012 - 2015	Bouterse-1
Justice and Police	Jennifer van Dijk-Silos	2015 - March 2017	Bouterse-2
Justice and Police	Ferdinand Welzijn*	2017	Bouterse-2
Justice and Police	Eugene van der San	2017	Bouterse-2
Justice and Police	Ferdinand Welzijn*	2017 - 2018	Bouterse-2
Justice and Police	Stuart Getrouw	2018 - 2020	Bouterse-2
Justice and Police	Kenneth Amoksi	2020 - present	Santokhi

== See also ==
- Justice ministry
- Politics of Suriname
