= Minister of Foreign Affairs (Suriname) =

Foreign minister of Suriname

Minister of Foreign Affairs, International Business and International Cooperation of the Republic of Suriname
- Minister van Buitenlandse Zaken, Internationale Business en Internationale Samenwerking van de Republiek Suriname
- Coat of arms of Suriname

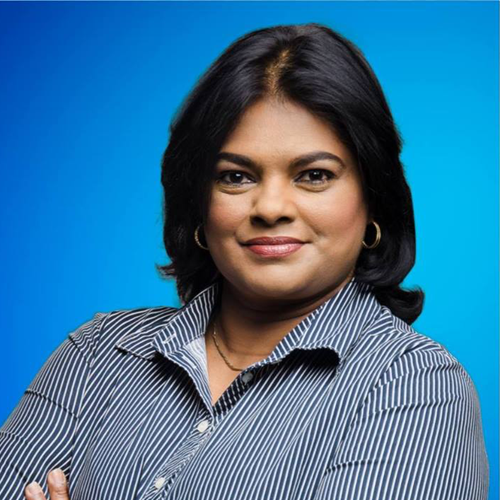
- Incumbent; Krishna Mathoera since 29 May 2025
- Ministry of Foreign Affairs, International Business and International Cooperation
- Type: Foreign minister
- Seat: Henck Arronstraat 8, Paramaribo
- Nominator: President of Suriname
- Appointer: President of Suriname
- Term length: No term limit
- Inaugural holder: Henck Arron
- Formation: 25 November 1975
- Website: foreignaffairs.gov.sr

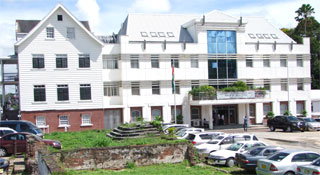
Seat of the Ministry of Foreign Affairs, International Business and International Cooperation in Paramaribo.

The Minister of Foreign Affairs, International Business and International Cooperation of the Republic of Suriname (Dutch: Minister van Buitenlandse Zaken, Internationale Business en Internationale Samenwerking van de Republiek Suriname) is a government minister in charge of the Ministry of Foreign Affairs, International Business and International Cooperation of Suriname, responsible for conducting foreign relations of the country.

== List of ministers ==
The following is a list of foreign ministers of Suriname since its founding in 1975:

| No. | Name (Birth–Death) | Portrait | Tenure |
|---|---|---|---|
| 1 | Henck Arron (1936–2000) (Note: Deposed in the Sergeants' Coup.) | | 1975–1980 |
| 2 | Henk Chin A Sen (1934–1999) | | 1980 |
| 3 | André Haakmat (1939–2024) | | 1980–1981 |
| 4 | Harvey Naarendorp (b. 1940) | | 1981–1983 |
| 5 | Errol Alibux (b. 1948) | | 1983–1984 |
| 6 | Wim Udenhout (1937–2023) | | 1984–1985 |
| 7 | Erik Tjon Kie Sim (1936–2009) | | 1985–1986 |
| 8 | Henk Herrenberg (1938–2024) | | 1986–1987 |
| 9 | Henk Heidweiller (1929–1989) | | 1987–1988 |
| 10 | Eddy Sedoc (1938–2011) (Note: Deposed in the Telephone Coup.) | | 1988–1990 |
| 11 | Robby Ramlakhan (b. 1956) | | 1991 |
| 12 | Subhas Mungra (b. 1945) | | 1991–1996 |
| 13 | Faried Pierkhan (b. 1960) | | 1996–1997 |
| 14 | Errol Snijders (b. 1948) | | 1997–2000 |
| 15 | Marie Levens (b. 1950) | | 2000–2005 |
| 16 | Lygia Kraag-Keteldijk (b. 1941) | | 2005–2010 |
| 17 | Winston Lackin (1954–2019) | | 2010–2015 |
| 18 | Niermala Badrising (b. 1962) | | 2015–2017 |
| 19 | Yldiz Pollack-Beighle (b. 1983) | | 2017–2020 |
| 20 | Albert Ramdin (b. 1958) | | 2020–2025 |
| 21 | Krishna Mathoera (b. 1963) | | 2025–present |

== See also ==
- List of diplomatic missions of Suriname
- Foreign relations of Suriname
- Politics of Suriname
