= Harvey Naarendorp =

Surinamese diplomat and politician

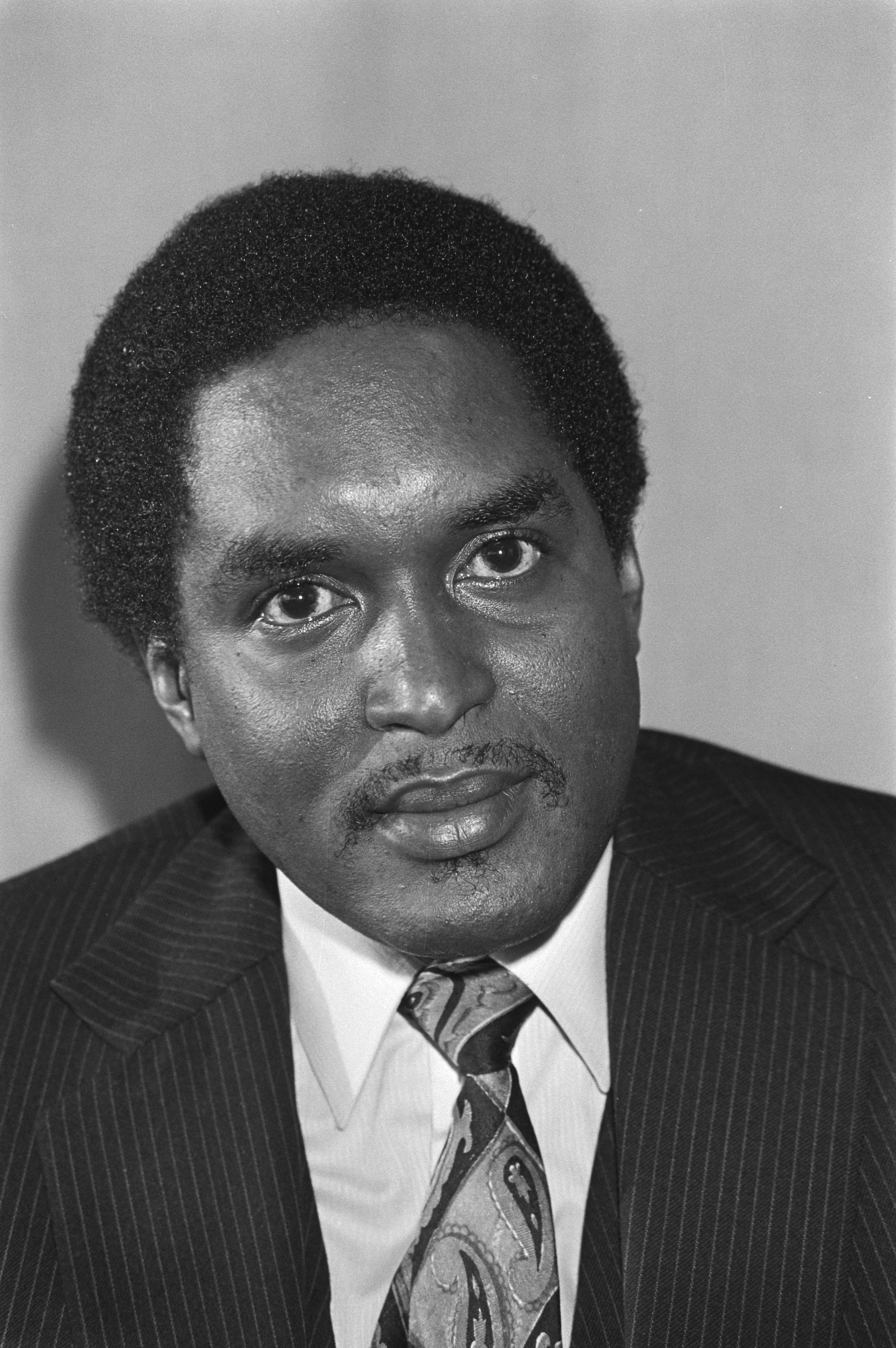
- Naarendorp in 1981

Deputy Prime Minister of Suriname
- In office 31 March 1982 – 9 December 1982
- Prime Minister: Henry Neijhorst
- Preceded by: André Haakmat
- Succeeded by: Winston Caldeira

Personal details
- Born: Harvey Harold Naarendorp; 31 March 1940 (age 86) Paramaribo, Suriname
- Party: National Democratic Party
- Occupation: Diplomat, politician

Harvey Harold Naarendorp (born 31 March 1940) is a Surinamese diplomat and politician.

== Biography ==
Naarendorp was born on March 31, 1940, in Paramaribo, Suriname. He grew up in Curaçao and returned to Suriname at the age of 15, where he finished high school. After working for a few years in the export department of Bruynzeel, he moved to the Netherlands, where he graduated in law from the University of Amsterdam in 1975. When the Sergeants' Coup led by Dési Bouterse took place on 25 February 1980, Naarendorp was a lecturer in private law at the University of Suriname.

In January 1981, Naarendorp succeeded André Haakmat as Minister of Justice and Police and Minister of Foreign Affairs. When the Neijhorst government took office on 31 March 1982, he served as the Deputy Prime Minister of Suriname until 9 December 1982, which was a day after the December murders when all ministers resigned.

In March 1983, Naarendorp was one of the founders of the 25 February Movement, which aimed to safeguard the principles of the 1980 revolution. This movement would later give rise to the National Democratic Party (NDP).

In November 1984, Naarendorp was succeeded as chief of staff of Dési Bouterse by Henk Herrenberg, after which he became ambassador of Suriname in Mexico. He was then ambassador of Suriname in Brazil from 1987 to 1991. From 1997 to 2001, Naarendorp was ambassador of Suriname in Trinidad and Tobago and also non-resident ambassador to Barbados, Haiti and the Dominican Republic.

In 2010, he became chief of staff of the cabinet of President Dési Bouterse and in 2011, he became ambassador of Suriname in France.

Naarendorp was suspected of involvement in the December murders, but was acquitted in June 2019.
