= Roy Horb =

- Born: Roy Dennis Horb; 13 December 1953; Suriname
- Died: 2 February 1983 (aged 29); Paramaribo, Suriname
- Occupation: Military officer

Roy Dennis Horb (13 December 1953 – 2 February 1983) was a Surinamese military officer. He was one of the sergeants who committed a military coup in Suriname on 25 February 1980, and the right hand man of army leader Dési Bouterse.

== Biography ==
Horb was a sergeant in Suriname. In 1979, he asked Dési Bouterse to be chairman of a new military union, and to take the lead in an execute coup. On 25 February 1980, Bouterse, Horb and fourteen other sergeants overthrew the Henck Arron government with a violent military coup d'état, now known as the Sergeants Coup. Horb became the second-in-command. After the coup, he became a member of the National Military Council of Suriname.

On 11 March 1982, a counter-coup was attempted by Surendre Rambocus. Wilfred Hawker, who was in prison after a failed counter-coup in 1981, escaped. This counter-coup also failed and Hawker was captured and summarily executed by Horb.

On 7 December 1982, the military rounded up 16 opponents who had criticized the military government and held them at Fort Zeelandia in Paramaribo. They were all murdered, with the exception of Fred Derby, whom Horb requested to be released. Bouterse gave Horb the orders to extort a confession of the prisoners, if necessary by force.

Bouterse and Horb had a difference of opinion on the way forward. Forced by international isolation, Bouterse sought support from leftist regimes of Fidel Castro in Cuba and Maurice Bishop in Grenada. Horb was against this support. He went to Pittsburgh, Pennsylvania for talks with the CIA. When his CIA contacts asked him if they could do something for him, he ordered two racehorses. As a result, his contacts were exposed.

Horb had been promoted to Major and deputy commander of the Surinamese army. In January 1983, Horb turned in his resignation from the army. On 30 January 1983, Horb was arrested himself along with Sergeant John Hardjoprajitno and at least 13 others. They were put in prison on charges of undermining state security. They were accused to be involved in a plot to murder Bouterse. On 2 February 1983, Horb was found dead in his cell in the penal barracks of the Military Police.

== Legacy ==
After his death, the book De Decembermoorden in Suriname (The December Murders in Suriname) was published written by an insider and based on testimony by Horb. The book detailed the events which took place at the December murders, and revealed that Bouterse had personally shot two of the victims. The author later revealed himself as Jan Sariman, the former minister of agriculture, who was arrested on 30 January 1983, and deported to the Netherlands. According to Sariman, Horb had given him a tape with his testimony.
