= Gerard Leckie =

Surinamese scientist (1943–1982)

- Born: 6 March 1943; Paramaribo, Suriname
- Died: 8 December 1982 (aged 39); Paramaribo, Suriname
- Occupations: Scientist, teacher

Gerard Leckie (6 March 1943 – 8 December 1982) was a Surinamese scientist, teacher and dean at the University of Suriname. He was one of the victims of the December murders.

== Biography ==
Leckie taught, was dean of the socio-economic faculty, but was also chairman of the Association for Scientific Personnel at the University of Suriname (VWPU). He studied psychology and was subsequently promoted at the University of Nijmegen.

On 24 November 1982, the Association for Democracy was founded, as a direct result of the announcement of reform plans by Dési Bouterse, which he unveiled in a speech on 15 November 1982. It consisted of people who wanted to commit themselves to the return of democracy in Suriname. Trade union actions and student demonstrations were organized, and in Paramaribo there was great unrest. The strike actions were a thorn in the eyes of Bouterse and his Group of Sixteen sergeants, who assumed that the actions were deliberately organized to cause unrest. The military saw Leckie as the instigator of the student protests; therefore he was placed on a list of opponents to be killed.

On 8 December 1982, on the personal order of Bouterse, Leckie was captured by the military, brought to prison in Fort Zeelandia, where he, after cruel torturing, was murdered, becoming one of the fifteen victims being killed by the military that day. On 13 December, he was buried at the Roman Catholic cemetery in Paramaribo, next to co-victim Jozef Slagveer. According to eyewitness accounts, he had bruises in his face and a bullet hole in his chest. When the graves of the victims were opened for forensic investigation in 2002, the grave of Leckie was opened first.
