= André Haakmat =

Surinamese politician and lawyer

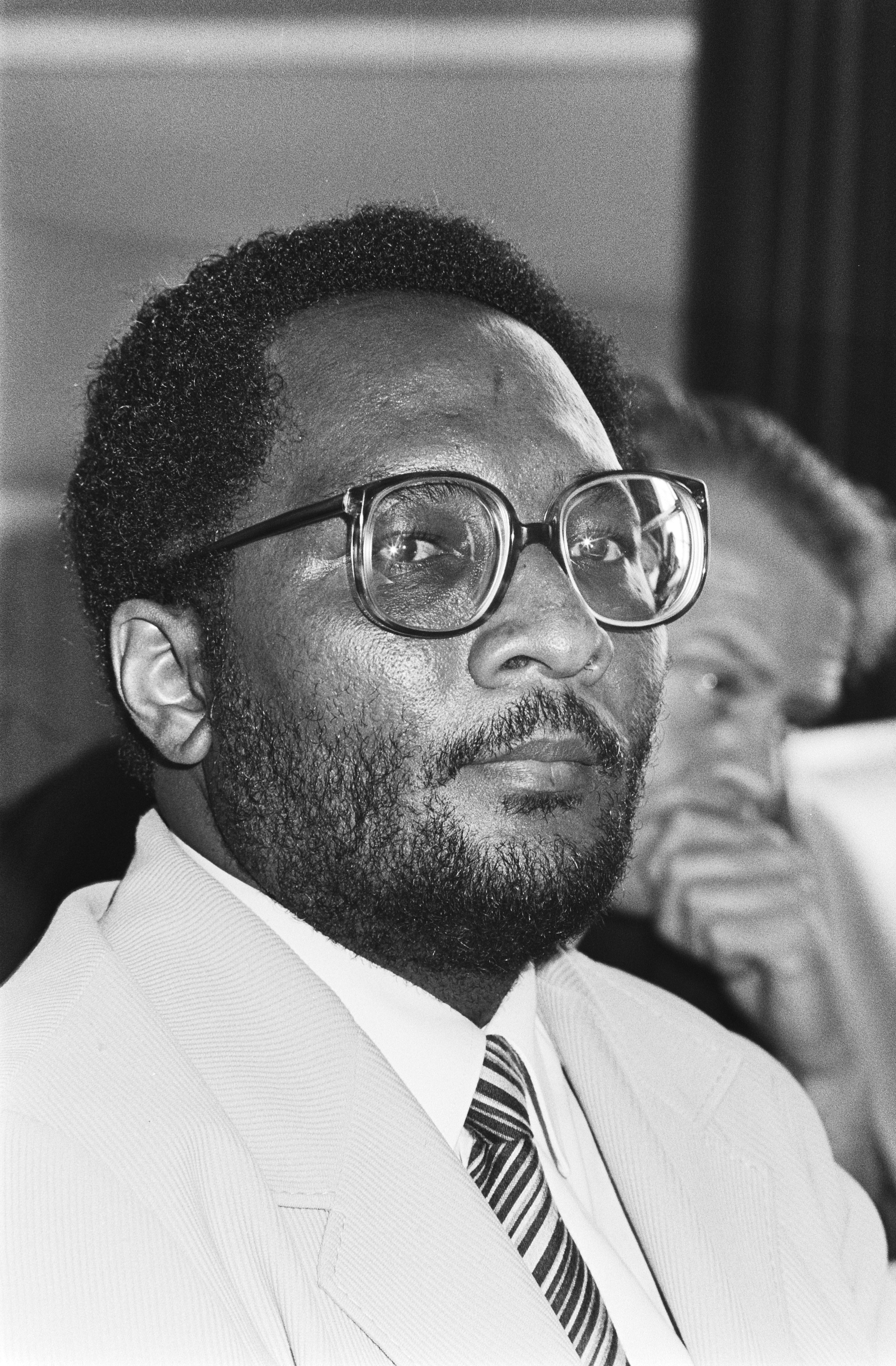
- Haakmat in 1983

Deputy Prime Minister of Suriname
- In office 15 August 1980 – 7 January 1981
- Prime Minister: Henk Chin A Sen
- Preceded by: Olton van Genderen
- Succeeded by: Harvey Naarendorp

Personal details
- Born: André Richard Haakmat; 21 March 1939 Paramaribo, Suriname
- Died: 25 November 2024 (aged 85) Amsterdam, Netherlands
- Party: Nationalist Republican Party
- Occupation: Politician, lawyer

André Richard Haakmat (21 March 1939 – 25 November 2024) was a Surinamese politician and lawyer.

He served in Suriname as the Deputy Prime Minister of Suriname, Minister of Foreign Affairs and Minister of Justice and Police from 1980 to 1981.

Haakmat died in Amsterdam on 25 November 2024, at the age of 85.
