= Sewraam Rambaran Mishre =

Surinamese politician

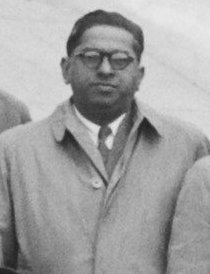
- Rambaran Mishre (1946)

Deputy Prime Minister of Suriname
- In office 30 June 1963 – 15 February 1964
- Prime Minister: Johan Adolf Pengel
- Preceded by: Alfred Morpurgo
- Succeeded by: Johan Kraag

Minister of Justice and Police
- In office 30 June 1963 – 15 February 1964
- Preceded by: Freek Emanuels
- Succeeded by: Jnan Hansdev Adhin (acting)

Minister of Agriculture and Fisheries
- In office 14 July 1958 – 15 February 1964

Personal details
- Born: 14 March 1915 Nickerie District, Suriname
- Died: 15 February 1964 (aged 48) Suriname
- Party: Progressive Reform Party (VHP)

Sewraam Rambaran Mishre (14 March 1915 – 15 February 1964) was a Surinamese physician and politician who served as the Deputy Prime Minister of Suriname from 30 June 1963 until his death.

== Biography ==
Rambaran Mishre was born on 14 March 1915 in Nickerie District. He studied at the Geneeskundige School, a free non-academic medical school. In 1952, he went to the University of Utrecht, and graduated Doctor of Medicine with a specialisation in cardiovascular disease in 1957.

Rambaran Mishre was active in politics for the United Hindu Party (later renamed Progressive Reform Party). In 1944, he was appointed to the Estates of Suriname by Governor Johannes Brons. In 1949, he was first elected to the Estates.

In 1958, Rambaran Mishre became Minister of Agriculture and Fisheries in the Emanuels cabinet. In 1963, he became Deputy Prime Minister of Suriname in the Pengel cabinet. He was also appointed Minister of Justice and Police and would retain Agriculture and Fisheries.

Rambaran Mishre died in office on 15 February 1964, at the age of 48.
