= Dino Bouterse =

Surinamese criminal

- Born: Dino Delano Bouterse; 27 September 1972 (age 53); Steenwijk, Netherlands
- Citizenship: Surinamese
- Parents: Dési Bouterse (father); Ingrid Figueira (mother)

Dino Delano Bouterse (born 27 September 1972) is the son of the former president of Suriname, Dési Bouterse. The former head of the Suriname Anti-Terrorist Unit, he is currently serving a 16-year sentence in the United States after being convicted in Manhattan, New York, on charges of drug smuggling and trying to help Hezbollah set up a base in Suriname and Latin America.

In July 2003, Bouterse was arrested on charges of large-scale theft of weapons in Suriname, when he attempted to enter Curaçao, part of the Kingdom of the Netherlands, under a false passport. He was sentenced in 2005 to eight years' imprisonment for international drug and arms trafficking.

On August 29, 2013, Bouterse was arrested by the DEA in Panama while traveling on a diplomatic passport. He was extradited to the United States and taken to New York City, where the U.S. attorney for Manhattan, Preet Bharara, sought the maximum sentence available but only obtained a 16-and-a-quarter-year prison sentence on 10 March 2015. He could be released in 2027. He is currently held at FCA Yazoo City Low.
