= Progressive Workers' and Farmers' Union =

Political party in Suriname

Progressive Workers' and Farmers' Union Progressieve Arbeiders- en Landbouwersunie
- President: Jim Hok
- Founded: 12 March 1977
- Ideology: Socialism; Marxism; Left-wing nationalism
- Political position: Left-wing to far-left
- National affiliation: Megacombinatie (formerly)
- Seats in the National Assembly: 0 / 51

Party flag

Website
- http://palu.sr/

The Progressive Workers' and Farmers' Union (Dutch: Progressieve Arbeiders- en Landbouwersunie), widely known by its abbreviation PALU, is a leftist Surinamese political party founded on 12 March 1977.

== History ==
The party has its origins in the pressure group by the same name founded in 1973. This group founded a political party in early 1977 to participate in the Surinamese general election of 1977. After the 1980 Surinamese coup d'état the party tried to steer the revolt into the direction of a workers' revolution. Under the leadership of Iwan Krolis and Errol Alibux, PALU had close contact with the military leadership headed by Dési Bouterse and was the only party allowed to be politically active in Suriname. In 1981 and 1983, PALU was part of the Surinamese government, with Errol Alibux serving as Prime Minister of Suriname.

In the 2010 Surinamese general election, PALU was part of the Megacombinatie electoral alliance under the leadership of the National Democratic Party led by Desi Bouterse. In the 2015 Surinamese general election, PALU again participated on an individual basis. Although the party achieved only 0.67% of the votes, PALU got one seat in the Coronie District. It lost that seat in the 2020 Surinamese general election, when it earned only 0.30% of the national vote.

Election	Seats	+/–	Votes	%	Government
1977	0 / 39	0	1,006	0.81	Extra-parliamentary
1987	4 / 51	▲4	2,910	1.69	Opposition
1991	0 / 51	▼4	4,807	3.03	Extra-parliamentary
2000	1 / 51	▲1	1,290	0.71	Opposition
2005	0 / 51	▼1	1,958	0.93	Extra-parliamentary
2010	1 / 51	▲1	1,211		Coalition
2015	1 / 51	0	1,736	0.67	Opposition
2020	0 / 51	▼1	820	0.30	Extra-parliamentary
2025	0 / 51	0			Extra-parliamentary
