= Corruption in Suriname =

Corruption in Suriname has drawn attention in recent years due to several high-profile cases involving top officials and agencies of the government. The incidence of corruption in Suriname has been attributed to the lack of transparency, accountability, and strong regulatory frameworks that address graft and corruption. Corruption cases have undermined the integrity of state institutions, including the country’s financial institutions and overall financial stability.

== Corruption scandals ==
=== CBvS Scandal ===
In 2020, the Central Bank of Suriname (CBvS) was embroiled in a corruption scandal that involved around $100 million. The fund, which was entrusted by private banks to the financial institution, was misused and at the center of the controversy was Robert van Trikt, the then governor of CBvS. He was accused of spending more than $800,000 for personal use, including the purchase of luxury vehicles. Van Trikt was convicted and sentenced to six years imprisonment for violating the country’s Anti-Corruption Act, forgery, embezzlement, money laundering, and participation in a criminal enterprise.

Van Trikt was found to have engaged in fraudulent contract with the Belgian company Clairfield Belgium, which was also ordered by a Belgian court in a separate court proceeding to repay CBvS as the fees were declared to have been obtained through void contracts. Clairfield signed five of these contracts with Van Trikt in 2019. It was also found that Van Trikt used bank funds to pay for his wife’s loans.

The bank governor, who was the son of a previous Education Minister, was not the only official implicated in the large-scale corruption case. Other high-ranking government executives were said to have participated and these include then Minister of Finance, Gillmore Hoefdraad, the former director of Legal Affairs of the Central Bank, Faranaaz Hausil, and the former director of the Surinamese Postspaarbank, Ginmardo Kromosoto. Hoefdraad and Hausil had both been convicted for their participation in the conspiracy.

=== Recent corruption cases ===
By March 2024, Suriname’s President Chan Santokhi and two of his cabinet ministers were involved in an alleged misappropriation of public funds. This stemmed from an investigation launched by the Public Prosecution Service concerning the disbursement of about $7.5 million to Pan-American Real Estate. The investigation was launched after an anonymous whistleblower filed a criminal complaint before the attorney general’s office. The transaction was alleged to have been completed based on falsified documents.

In the same year, press freedom also came under scrutiny due to a legal battle over a book on corruption. Authored by Dutch entrepreneur Gerard van den Bergh, Corruption at the Highest Level: Doing Business in Suriname was at the center of the controversy. Santoki, who was one of the public officials cited in the book, not only filed a lawsuit against the book publisher but also targeted newspapers that featured it as well as bookstores selling copies. The move raised concerns over the state of press freedom and expression in Suriname. Some shops have already withdrawn the book from their shelves and instituted recall of sold copies. Also included in Van den Bergh’s work are allegations of corruption by Livestock and Fisheries Minister Parmanand Sewdien and entrepreneur Vijay Kirpalani.

== Anti-corruption measures ==
The legal framework that addresses corruption in Suriname includes instruments introduced as part of the country’s commitment to international and regional human rights and anti-corruption treaties. A Steering Group was also established to monitor and facilitate the country’s anti-corruption initiatives at the local and international levels. An anti-corruption bill is also under consideration by the Surinamese National Assembly to augment the existing measures. Recent measures include training, workshops, and public awareness initiatives designed to strengthen institutional and procedural reforms addressing corruption. These include the conduct of the National Risk Assessment (NRA), which sought to identify and address money laundering and terrorist financing risks in the country.

== International rankings ==
Transparency International's 2025 Corruption Perceptions Index gave Suriname a score of 38 on a scale from 0 ("highly corrupt") to 100 ("very clean"). When ranked by score, Suriname ranked 96th among the 182 countries in the Index, where the country ranked first is perceived to have the most honest public sector. For comparison with regional scores, the best score among the countries of the Americas (Note: Argentina, Bahamas, Barbados, Belize, Bolivia, Brazil, Canada, Chile, Colombia, Costa Rica, Cuba, Dominica, Dominican Republic, Ecuador, El Salvador, Grenada, Guatemala, Guyana, Haiti, Honduras, Jamaica, Mexico, Nicaragua, Panama, Paraguay, Peru, Saint Lucia, Saint Vincent and the Grenadines, Suriname, Trinidad and Tobago, United States of America, Uruguay, Venezuela) was 75, the average score was 42 and the worst score was 10. For comparison with worldwide scores, the best score was 89 (ranked 1), the average score was 42, and the worst score was 9 (ranked 181, in a two-way tie).
