= Subhas Mungra =

Surinamese politician (born 1945)

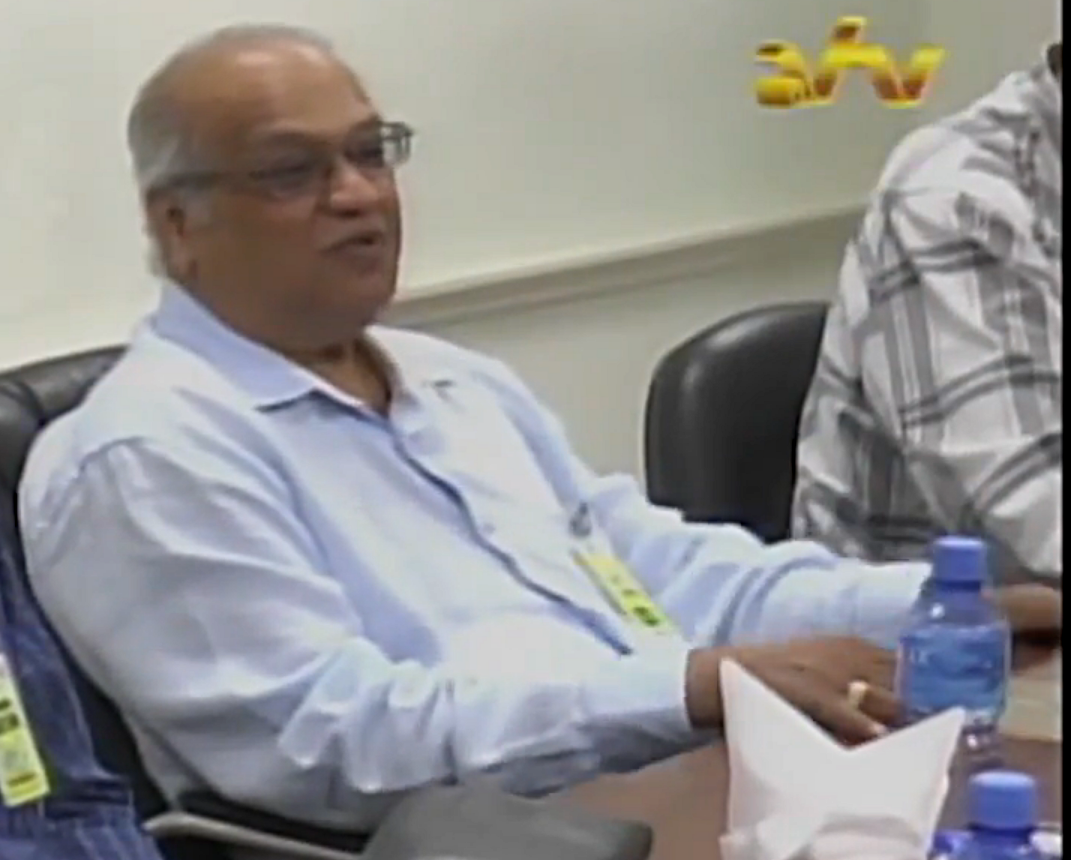
Subhas Mungra in 2016.

Subhas Chandra Mungra (born 2 September 1945) is a Surinamese diplomat and former Foreign Minister. He was Minister of Finance from 1986 to 1990. He served as Ambassador to the US from 2011 until 2017, and served as Permanent Representative of Suriname on the Permanent Council of the Organization of American States.
