= Errol Alibux =

Surinamese politician (born 1948)

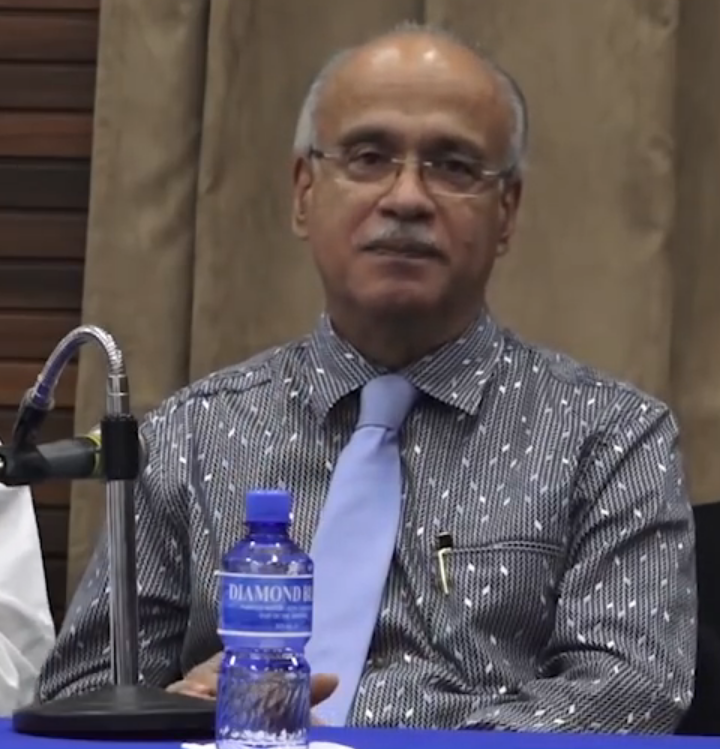
- Errol Alibux in 2017

Prime Minister of Suriname
- In office 26 February 1983 – 8 January 1984
- President: Fred Ramdat Misier
- Deputy: Winston Caldeira
- Preceded by: Henry Neijhorst
- Succeeded by: Wim Udenhout

Personal details
- Born: Liakat Ali Errol Alibux; 30 November 1948 (age 77) Paramaribo, Colony of Suriname
- Party: NDP
- Other political affiliations: Democratic National Platform 2000; Progressive Workers' and Farmers' Union
- Education: Erasmus University Rotterdam

Liakat Ali Errol Alibux (born 30 November 1948 in Paramaribo) is a Surinamese politician historically associated with the PALU. He also served as Prime Minister of Suriname for 11 months, from 1983 to 1984.

== Career ==
From 1967 to 1973, he studied sociology at the Erasmus University Rotterdam.

He was Prime Minister of Suriname during a period of military rule under Dési Bouterse. As a suspect in the December murders his appointment, by elected leader Bouterse, as an ambassador to Turkey was criticized by the Netherlands.

Political offices
Preceded by Henry Neijhorst	Prime Minister of Suriname; 1983–1984	Succeeded by Wim Udenhout
Preceded by Harvey Naarendorp	Minister of Foreign Affairs of Suriname; 1983–1984	Succeeded by Wim Udenhout
