= Edward Belfort =

Surinamese politician (1965–2025)

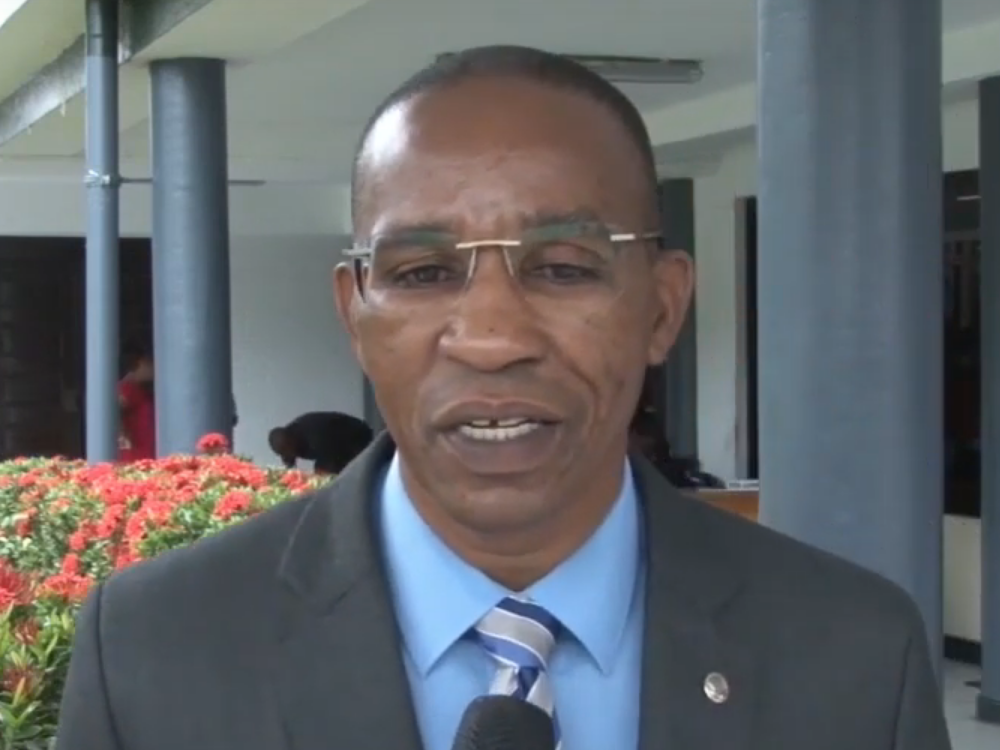
- Belfort in 2019

Minister of Justice and Police
- In office 2012–2015
- Preceded by: Martin Misiedjan
- Succeeded by: Jennifer van Dijk-Silos

Member of the National Assembly of Suriname
- In office 25 May 2015 – 7 April 2025

Personal details
- Born: Edward Ciriel Jeffry Belfort; 1 August 1965; Moengo, Suriname
- Died: 7 April 2025 (aged 59); Paramaribo, Suriname
- Political party: ABOP; NDP
- Education: Anton de Kom University of Suriname
- Occupation: Teacher

Edward Ciriel Jeffry Belfort (1 August 1965 – 7 April 2025) was a Surinamese politician. A member of the General Liberation and Development Party and later the National Democratic Party, he served as Minister of Justice and Police from 2012 to 2015 and was a member of the National Assembly from 2015 to 2025.

Belfort died in Paramaribo on 7 April 2025, at the age of 59.
