= Progressive Labour Federation 47 =

C-47
- Progressive Labour Federation 47
- Progressieve Vakcentrale 47
- Headquarters: Paramaribo, Suriname
- Location: Suriname
- Affiliations: ITUC

The Progressive Labour Federation 47 (C-47) is a trade union federation in Suriname. It is affiliated with the International Trade Union Confederation.
