= Henk Herrenberg =

Surinamese diplomat and politician (1938–2024)

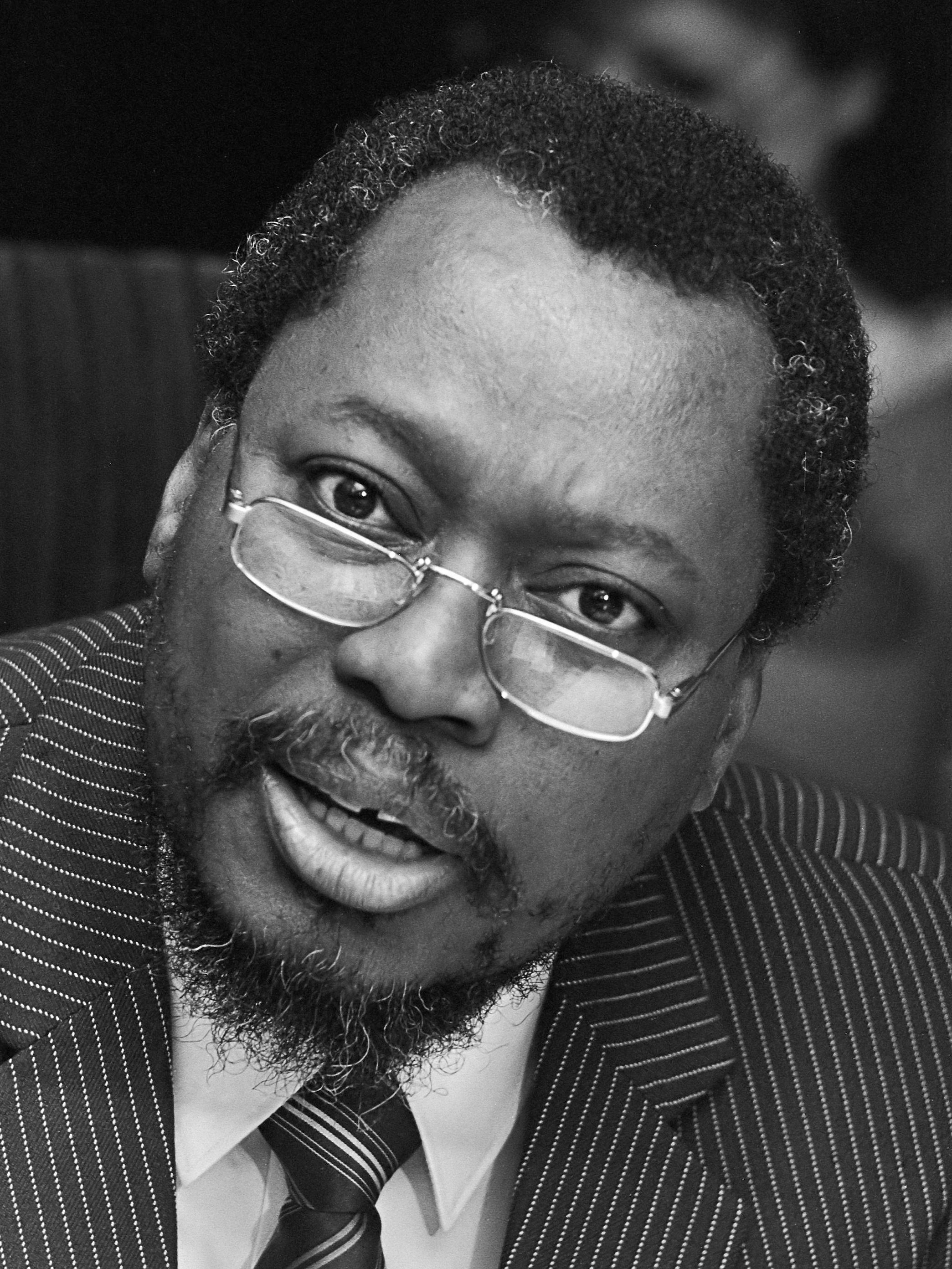
- Herrenberg in 1983

Ambassador of Suriname in China
- In office 1998–1999
- Preceded by: Office Established

Minister of Foreign Affairs, International Business and International Cooperation of the Republic of Suriname
- In office 1986–1987
- Preceded by: Erik Tjon Kie Sim
- Succeeded by: Henk Heidweiller

Ambassador of Suriname in the Netherlands
- In office 1982–1984
- Preceded by: Hans Prade
- Succeeded by: Henk Heidweiller

Personal details
- Born: 8 October 1938 Paramaribo, Surinam
- Died: 13 December 2024 (aged 86) Suriname
- Occupation: Diplomat, politician

Hendrik Frans Herrenberg (8 October 1938 – 13 December 2024) was a Surinamese diplomat and politician.

== Life and career ==
Herrenberg was born on 8 October 1938. He was a member of the National Democratic Party. He served as an ambassador of Suriname in the Netherlands (1982–1984), as the minister of foreign affairs (1986–1987) and an ambassador of Suriname in China (1998–1999). Herrenberg also worked as a journalist.

Herrenberg died on 13 December 2024, at the age of 86.
