= Fred Ramdat Misier =

President of Suriname from 1982 to 1988

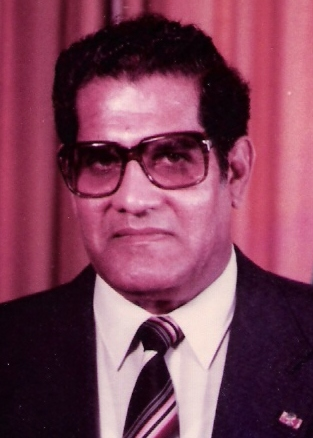

3rd President of Suriname
- In office 8 February 1982 – 25 January 1988
- Prime Minister: Henry Neijhorst; Errol Alibux; Wim Udenhout; Jules Wijdenbosch
- Preceded by: Henk Chin A Sen
- Succeeded by: Ramsewak Shankar

Personal details
- Born: Lachmipersad Frederik Ramdat Misier; 28 October 1926 Paramaribo, Surinam
- Died: 25 June 2004 (age 77) Paramaribo, Suriname
- Spouse: Hilda Doergadei Dewanchand (1924-2021)

Lachmipersad Frederik "Fred" Ramdat Misier (28 October 1926 – 25 June 2004) was the 3rd President of Suriname, serving from 1982 to 1988.

== Early life ==
He was born on 28 October 1926 in Paramaribo, Suriname. His parents were Rampargas Ramdat Misier and Ramkali Durgadulare.

Misier later met Hilda Doergadei Dewanchand (1924–2021), who was from Onverwacht. They were married on 28 January 1953. In 1958, the couple moved to the Netherlands, where Misier studied law at Utrecht University.

== Political career ==
Before becoming president, Fred Ramdat Misier served as a teacher, lawyer, and Vice President of the Court of Justice. Following the unexpected resignation of President Henk Chin A Sen after a conflict with the military, Ramdat Misier ascended to the presidency on 8 February 1982 in accordance with a constitutional provision dictating that the head of the Court of Justice assume the role of acting head of state. Serving as acting president rather than a direct military appointee, he held the position to maintain institutional stability until the democratic elections of November 1987. Ramdat Misier subsequently oversaw the transition of power to the democratically elected Ramsewak Shankar in February 1988.

== Death ==
Ramdat Misier died on 25 June 2004, at the age of 77. His death occurred at the country's capital, Paramaribo. Former president Jules Wijdenbosch commented on Ramdat Misier's political career, saying "he has played a vital role in Suriname's new democratic gestation. He brought unprecedented developments for the country." He is survived by his spouse, Hilda Doergadei Dewanchand. Ramdat Misier's cremation was held on 30 July and was attended by a number of dignitaries, including Wijdenbosch and then president Ronald Venetiaan.

Political offices
Preceded by Henk Chin A Sen	President of Suriname; 1982–1988	Succeeded by Ramsewak Shankar
