= Wim Udenhout =

Surinamese politician (1937–2023)

Prime Minister of Suriname
- In office 3 February 1984 – 17 July 1986
- President: Fred Ramdat Misier
- Deputy: Frank Leeflang
- Preceded by: Errol Alibux
- Succeeded by: Pretaap Radhakishun

Personal details
- Born: Willem Alfred Udenhout; 29 September 1937 Coronie District, Colony of Suriname
- Died: 22 May 2023 (aged 85) Paramaribo, Suriname
- Party: Independent
- Education: Leiden University

Willem Alfred Udenhout (29 September 1937 – 22 May 2023) was a Surinamese politician. He served as the military-installed Prime Minister of Suriname from February 1984 to July 1986. He had previously been a teacher and, for a time, a Black Power activist. As an academic he had a PhD in English literature from Leiden University. He later served as an ambassador to the United States. He did not favor investigating the military's murder of civilians or of Maroon people. He was also the Chairman of the Suriname Conservation Foundation.

Udenhout died on 22 May 2023, at the age of 85.

Political offices
Preceded by Errol Alibux	Prime Minister of Suriname; 1984–1986	Succeeded by Pretaap Radhakishun
Preceded by Errol Alibux	Minister of Foreign Affairs of Suriname; 1984–1985	Succeeded by Erik Tjon Kie Sim
