= Frank Leeflang =

Surinamese jurist and politician (1936–2024)

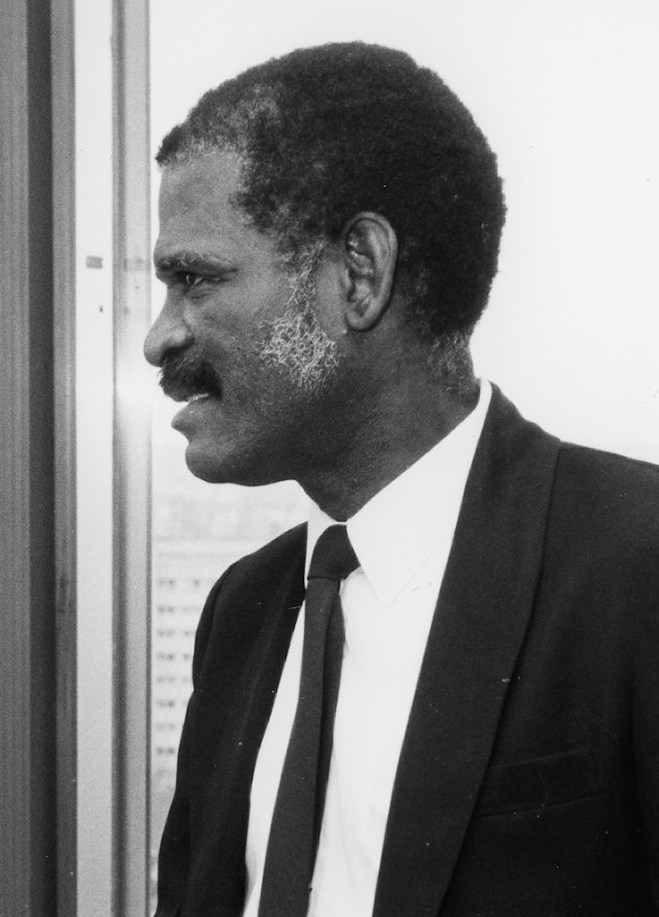
- Leeflang in 1986

Minister of Justice
- In office 1982–1985
- Preceded by: Harvey Naarendorp
- Succeeded by: Subhas Punwasi

Minister of the Interior
- In office 1980–1985
- Preceded by: Olton van Genderen
- Succeeded by: Jules Wijdenbosch

Personal details
- Born: Franklin Juliaan Leeflang; 20 July 1936 Paramaribo, Surinam
- Died: 5 May 2024 (aged 87)
- Party: NDP
- Occupation: Jurist; Diplomat

Franklin Juliaan "Frank" Leeflang (20 July 1936 – 5 May 2024) was a Surinamese jurist, diplomat, and politician. A member of the National Democratic Party, he served as Minister of the Interior from 1980 to 1985 and Minister of Justice from 1982 to 1985.

Leeflang died on 5 May 2024, at the age of 87.
