= Henk Chin A Sen =

President of Suriname from 1980 to 1982

- 陳亞先
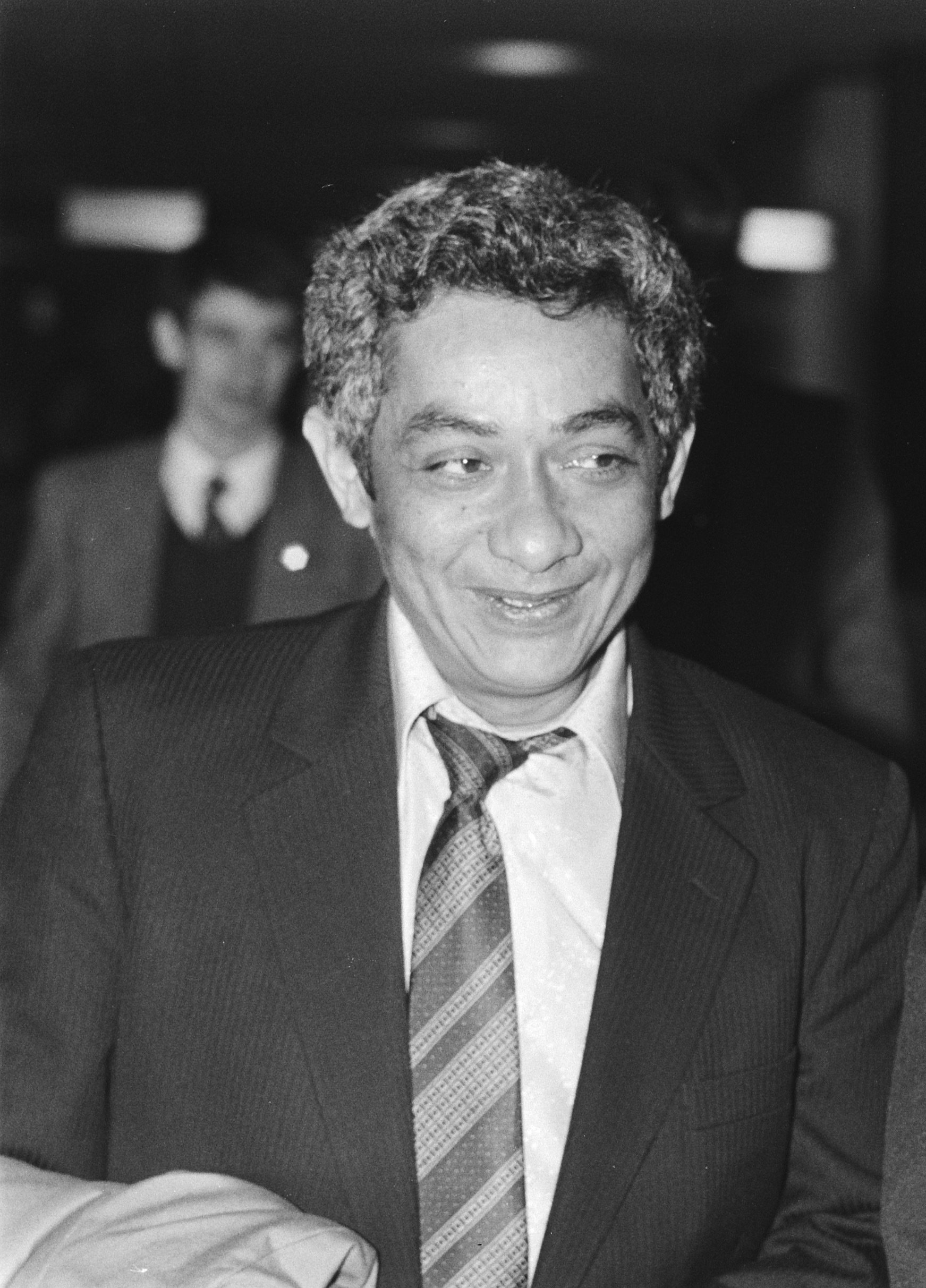

2nd President of Suriname
- In office 15 August 1980 – 4 February 1982
- Prime Minister: Himself
- Preceded by: Johan Ferrier
- Succeeded by: Fred Ramdat Misier

2nd Prime Minister of Suriname
- In office 15 March 1980 – 4 February 1982
- President: Johan Ferrier; Himself
- Preceded by: Henck Arron
- Succeeded by: Henry Neijhorst

Personal details
- Born: Hendrik Rudolf Chin A Sen; 18 January 1934 Albina, Surinam
- Died: 11 August 1999 (aged 65) Paramaribo, Suriname
- Party: Nationalist Republican Party
- Spouse: Sherlyne Chin A Sen
- Occupation: Politician, physician
Henk Chin A Sen
- Traditional Chinese: 陳亞先
- Simplified Chinese: 陈亚先
Transcriptions
Standard Mandarin
- Hanyu Pinyin: Chén Yàxiān
- Bopomofo: ㄔㄣˊ ㄧㄚˋ ㄒㄧㄢ
- Gwoyeu Romatzyh: Chern Yah Shian

Hendrik Rudolf "Henk" Chin A Sen (Chinese: 陳亞先; 18 January 1934 – 11 August 1999) was a Surinamese politician who served as the President of Suriname from 15 August 1980 until 4 February 1982.

== Biography ==
Chin A Sen was born in the town of Albina, on 18 January 1934. He studied medicine at the Geneeskundige School of Paramaribo and graduated in 1959. From 1959-1961, he began a general practice, then went to the Netherlands to specialize as an internist. When he returned to Suriname, he worked in the Sint Vincentius Hospital in Paramaribo. Then he joined the Nationalist Republican Party (PNR), a party which pursued the independence of Suriname, although he was not very active.

On 15 March 1980, after the Sergeants Coup, which brought Dési Bouterse and his military council to power, Chin A Sen was installed as Prime Minister of Suriname. The appointment of the non-politically active Chin A Sen came as a surprise. Chin A Sen formed a leftist cabinet which included two members of the National Military Council (NMR) and also for time females. Siegmien Power-Staphorst and Nel Stadwijk-Kappel were appointed under minister and Power-Staphorst soon after became a minister. On 15 August 1980, after President Johan Ferrier resigned, Chin A Sen assumed the post of President as well.

On 4 February 1982, Chin A Sen was fired by Bouterse after a disagreement. He exiled himself first to Pittsburgh in the United States, and then to the Netherlands where he arrived on 27 December 1982. In the Netherlands, after the December murders of 1982, Chin A Sen was chosen as Chairman of the Council for the Liberation of Suriname. The Council opposed the reign of Bouterse and his supporters, but it was not very successful. Chin A Sen was later in connection with Ronnie Brunswijk and his Jungle Commando, who waged an armed struggle against Bouterse.

On 7 March 1985, five musicians practising in an office building in Rijswijk were attacked by armed men. Three musicians were killed. The offices of Chin A Sen and the Council for the Liberation were located on the same floor. The hit was probably directed against Chin A Sen. He was, however, not present at that moment. The investigation was reopened in 1997, but no prosecution was made.

In 1995, Chin A Sen returned to Paramaribo, where he resumed his work as an internist. He died at the age of 65 in Paramaribo.

Political offices
Preceded by Henck Arron	Prime Minister of Suriname; 1980–1982	Succeeded by Henry Roëll Neijhorst
Preceded by Johan Ferrier	President of Suriname; 1980–1982	Succeeded by Fred Ramdat Misier
