= December murders =

1982 killings of Surinamese political opponents

The December murders (Dutch: Decembermoorden) were the murders on 7, 8, and 9 December 1982, of fifteen prominent young Surinamese men who had criticized the military dictatorship then ruling Suriname. Thirteen of these men were arrested on December 7 between 2 am and 5 am while sleeping in their homes (according to reports by the families of the victims). The other two were Surendre Rambocus and Jiwansingh Sheombar who were already imprisoned for attempting a countercoup in March 1982. Soldiers of Dési Bouterse (dictator of Suriname at the time) took them to Fort Zeelandia (at that time Bouterse's headquarters), where they were heard as "suspects in a trial" by Bouterse and other sergeants in a self-appointed court. After these "hearings" they were tortured and shot dead. The circumstances remain unclear. On 10 December 1982, Bouterse claimed on national television that all of the detainees had been shot dead "in an attempt to flee".

The December murders led to international protest by numerous Western countries and human rights organizations. The former colonial power, the Netherlands, immediately froze development aid. Many Surinamese civilians fled Suriname for the Netherlands.

Bouterse had long denied guilt in the December murders. In March 2007 he accepted political responsibility for the murders, but he then also explicitly stated that he personally had not 'pulled the trigger' to kill the fifteen men. In March 2012, however, a former confidant of Bouterse testified under oath that Bouterse himself had shot two of the victims.

== Description ==
After their abduction, the fifteen victims were transported to Fort Zeelandia, the then headquarters of Bouterse and his soldiers in Paramaribo, the capital of Suriname. The soldiers performing the action were under command of Bouterse, the then dictator of Suriname and also leader of the Surinamese army. Among the victims were lawyers, journalists, businessmen, soldiers, university teachers and a union leader.

A sixteenth arrested person, trade union leader Fred Derby, was released unexpectedly on December 8. Derby reported his experiences on December 8, 2000, saying he was not murdered because, Bouterse told him, he was needed to cool the temper of the unions, which were frequently on strike at that time.

=== Victims ===
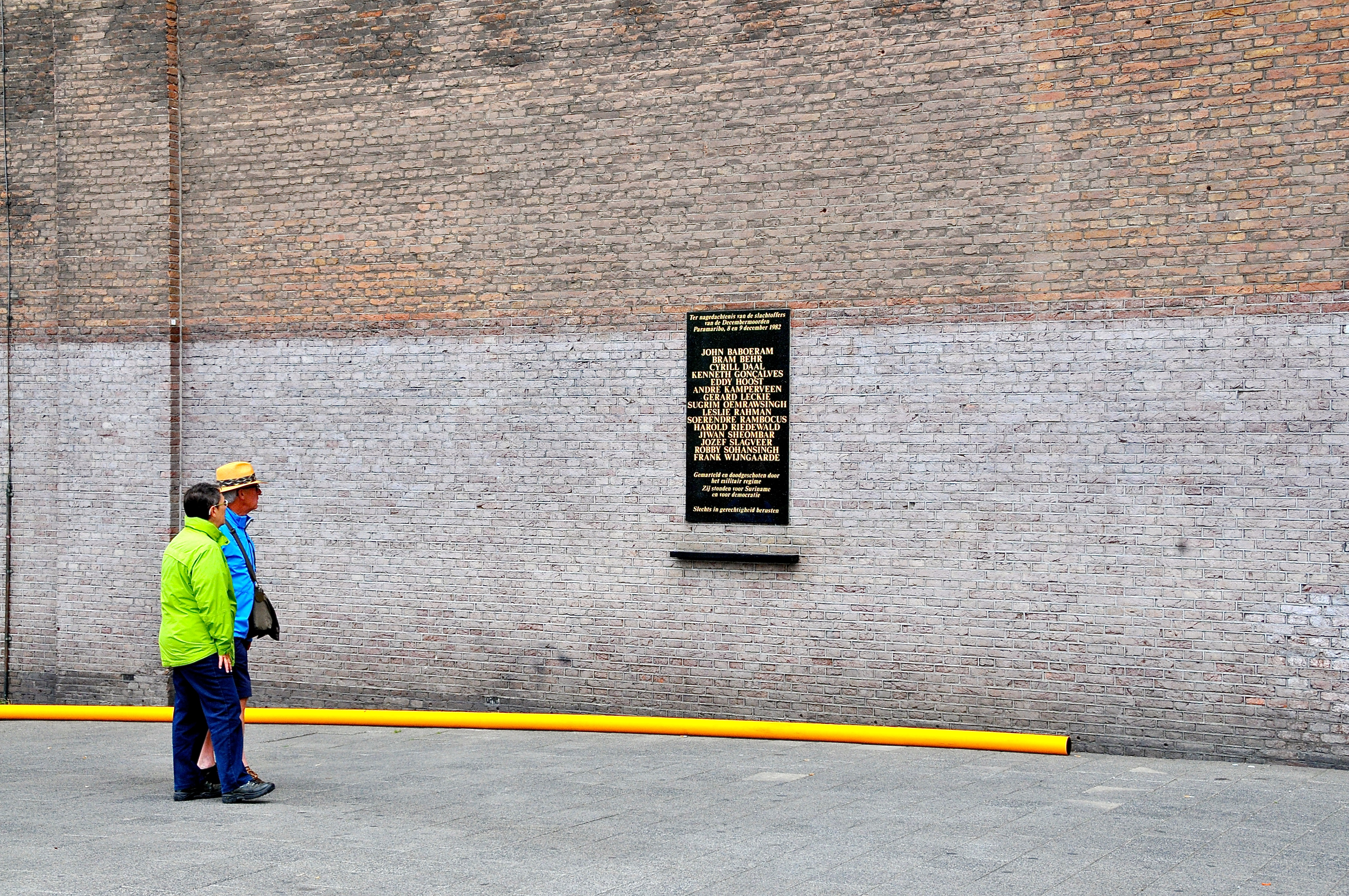
Plaque in Waterlooplein, Amsterdam, commemorating the victims of the December murders

- John Baboeram, lawyer
- Bram Behr, journalist
- Cyrill Daal, union leader
- Kenneth Gonçalves, lawyer
- Eddy Hoost, lawyer, former minister
- André Kamperveen, football player, journalist and businessman
- Gerard Leckie, university teacher
- Sugrim Oemrawsingh, scientist
- Lesley Rahman, journalist
- Surendre Rambocus, military officer
- Harold Riedewald, lawyer
- Jiwansingh Sheombar, military soldier
- Jozef Slagveer, journalist
- Robby Sohansingh, businessman
- Frank Wijngaarde, journalist (with Dutch citizenship)

==== Jozef Slagveer ====
Jozef Slagveer (25 January 1940) was a journalist and writer. He was born in Totness and graduated from the Free University in journalism. On his return to Suriname in 1967, he started work at the Ministry of Education. In 1971, he started a press agency and magazine together with Rudi Kross. His magazine uncovered several corruption scandals. He also published several books and poetry collections both in Dutch and Sranan Tongo.

After the 1980 coup d'état, Slagveer joined the sergeants and became their spokesperson on television and censor. Gradually he became more critical, and eventually broke all contact with the military regime. On 7 December 1982, Slagveer was arrested, and, with visible signs of torture, forced to read a confession on television that the group had tried to overthrow the government. He was killed the next day.

=== Suspects ===
In the December murders trial that commenced on November 30, 2007, there were 25 suspects with Bouterse being the only main suspect.

- Errol Alibux
- Dick de Bie
- Etienne Boerenveen
- Dési Bouterse (main suspect)
- Benny Brondenstein
- Winston Caldeira
- Wim Carbière
- Steven Dendoe
- Iwan Dijksteel
- Roy Esajas
- Ernst Gefferie
- Arthy Gorré
- John Hardjoprajitno
- Orlando Heidanus
- Kenneth Kempes
- Iwan Krolis
- Luciën Lewis
- Harvey Naarendorp
- John Nelom
- Edgar Ritfeld
- Ruben Rozendaal
- Badrissein Sital
- Jimmy Stolk
- Imro Themen
- Marcel Zeeuw

== Aftermath and legal action ==
Only after many years the government of Suriname took the first official legal steps toward clarifying the case. After the murders, the victims' bodies were buried without post-mortem examinations having been performed; moreover, no legal investigation was conducted.

Politically, the murders continue to exert an influence on Surinamese politics. After the 2010 general election, won by Bouterse, then-president Ronald Venetiaan refused to even mention Bouterse's name or congratulate him; Venetiaan, the Minister of Education in the government of Henck Arron, prime minister of the government overthrown by Bouterse in 1980, was a personal friend of most of the fifteen victims.

After the election of Bouterse as president in August 2010, Parliament moved in 2012 to amend a 1992 amnesty law to include the period of the December murders. The amendment was signed into law in April 2012 by the vice president, and resulted in halting the murder trial against (among others) then-president Desi Bouterse. The trial in front of the court-martial was halted to await a judgment of the Constitutional Court - which was defined by law, but never appointed. After some years of standstill and no appointment of a Constitutional Court, the trial continued in 2015 after an order of the court-martial. Using his authority as defined in article 148 of the Constitution of Suriname, President Bouterse then declared that the trial was a threat to national security, and ordered the prosecutor to halt prosecution on 29 June 2016. The court-martial was expected to continue the trial and consider this new fact by 30 November 2016, but this time the trial was postponed until 30 January because of illness of one of the judges. Eventually the court-martial ordered the prosecutor on 30 January 2017 to read the charges and ignore the instructions by the president because the matter was no longer in hands of the executive but of the judicial branch. Next, the continuation of the trial was postponed to await the outcomes and timelines in other trials.

In June 2017, military prosecutor Roy Elgin was able to read his conclusions, and demanded a 20-year prison sentence for the main suspect Desi Bouterse. He argued that Bouterse was behind the murders, was present but also that he was unable to prove that he pulled the trigger. In a response, Bouterse implied that he was not willing to accept a conviction by the court, as he was "appointed by God".

=== Verdict ===
On 29 November 2019, a military court came to a verdict. Of the main suspects, incumbent president Bouterse was found guilty and was sentenced to 20 years in prison. Main co-defendant Etienne Boerenveen was acquitted. Bouterse was sentenced in absentia, and filed an appeal. On 30 April 2021, Bouterse appeared in court where he used his right to silence. On 30 August 2021, the verdict of 20 years was upheld. Bouterse filed an appeal on 3 September, which was denied by the Surinamese Supreme Court in 2023. Bouterse died on 24 December 2024 while he was in hiding to avoid imprisonment for his conviction in the murders.

Bouterse's accomplices – Ernst Geffery, Iwan Dijksteel, Benny Brondenstein and Stephanus Dendoe – were sentenced to 15 years in prison. The Public Prosecution Service ordered them to report to Santo Boma prison on January 12, 2024. Gefferie, Brondenstein and Dendoe turned themselves in. Dijksteel has been at large since then. Three other accomplices, Steven Dendoe, Kenneth Kempes and Lugéne Lewis were each sentenced to ten years in prison. Kempes and Lewis, who did not appeal their 10-year prison sentences, are also still at large.
