= 1980 Surinamese coup d'état =

Military coup led by Desi Bouterse

- Part of the Cold War
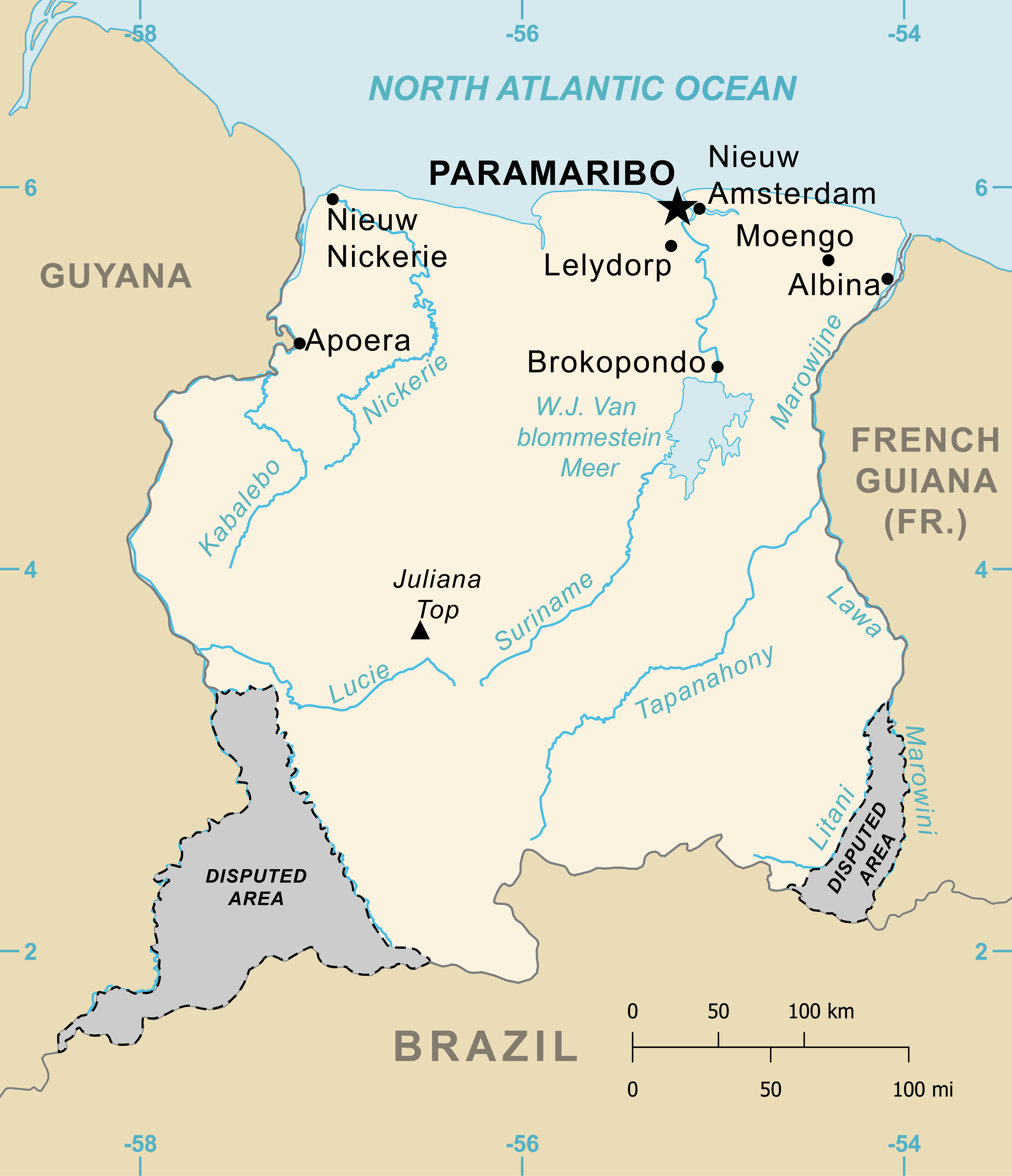
- Map of Suriname.
Date	25 February 1980
Location	Paramaribo, Suriname 5°51′8″N 55°12′14″W
Result	Coup attempt succeeds.: Henck Arron is overthrown.; Dési Bouterse assumed de facto control of the country.

Belligerents
Government of Suriname Supported by: Guyana; Venezuela; United States	Surinamese Armed Forces: National Military Council; Supported by: Brazil; China; Cuba; Soviet Union

Commanders and leaders
Johan Ferrier; Henck Arron	Dési Bouterse
- Nexus of coup in Paramaribo

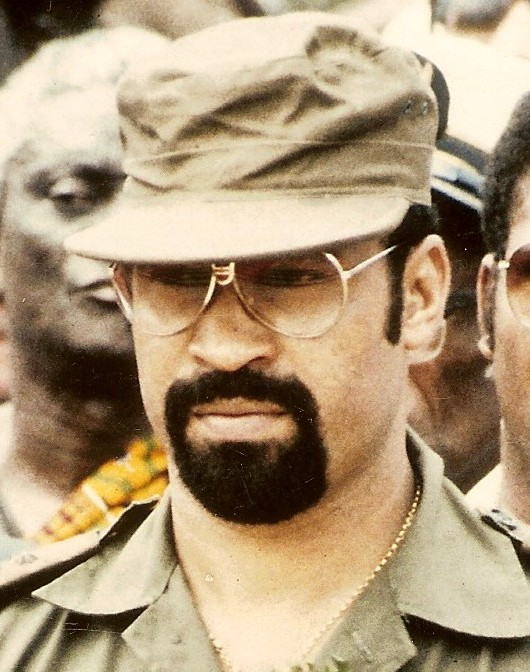
Bouterse as the Commander of the Armed Forces in 1985.

The 1980 Surinamese coup d'état, usually referred to as the Sergeants' Coup (Dutch: De Sergeantencoup), was a military coup in Suriname which occurred on 25 February 1980, when a group of 16 sergeants (Dutch: groep van zestien, lit. 'group of sixteen') of the Surinamese Armed Forces (SKM) led by Dési Bouterse overthrew the government of Prime Minister Henck Arron with a violent coup d'état. This marked the beginning of the military dictatorship that dominated the country from 1980 until 1991. The dictatorship featured the presence of an evening curfew, the lack of freedom of press, a ban on political parties (from 1985), a restriction on the freedom of assembly, a high level of government corruption, and the summary executions of political opponents.

== Background ==
The Netherlands granted Suriname independence on 25 November 1975. It was marked by social unrest, economic depression, and rumours of corruption. The hastily created Suriname National Army had many non-commissioned officers who tried to unionize and complained about corruption and poor pay. Prime Minister Henck Arron refused to recognise them and arrested the ringleaders, who were to go to trial on 26 February 1980. Elections were also scheduled for March 1980.

== Coup ==
On 25 February 1980, the coup soldiers took control of the military camps in Paramaribo and arrested superiors who opposed them. The main resistance occurred at the Central Police Station, which was burned to the ground. After the police surrendered, the coup leaders took control. Arron was then imprisoned on charges of corruption.

President Johan Ferrier was eventually forced out of office in August 1980, and several months after the coup d'état by Bouterse, most of the political authority transferred to the military leadership. Until 1988, the titular presidents were essentially army-installed by Bouterse, who ruled as a de facto leader with few practical checks on his power.

=== December murders and Moiwana massacre ===
On 8 December 1982, a group of fifteen academics, journalists, lawyers, union leaders and military officials who opposed the military rule in Suriname were snatched from their beds and brought to Fort Zeelandia in Paramaribo, where they were tortured and executed by Bouterse's soldiers. Fourteen of those executed were Surinamese, and the journalist Frank Wijngaarde was a Dutch national. The events are known as the December murders.

In 1986 Bouterse's soldiers killed at least 39 citizens, mostly children and women, of the Maroon village of Moiwana, as part of the Surinamese Interior War, which was fought between the soldiers of Bouterse and the Jungle Commando led by Ronnie Brunswijk.

== Transition to democratic rule ==
A new constitution was adopted via referendum in 1987. Bouterse remained in charge of the army, but elections were held later that year. Dissatisfied with the government, Bouterse overthrew them on 24 December 1990 during another coup. The event became popularly known as "the telephone coup."

In 1991, elections returned to Suriname, and the New Front party gained 30 of the 51 parliament seats. Ronald Venetiaan, a fierce opponent of Bouterse, became president. In 1996, Jules Wijdenbosch was elected as president of Suriname on behalf of Bouterse's party, the National Democratic Party (NDP). In 2000 and 2005, Ronald Venetiaan was elected as president of Suriname. Dési Bouterse himself returned to power as president in 2010.

== National holiday ==
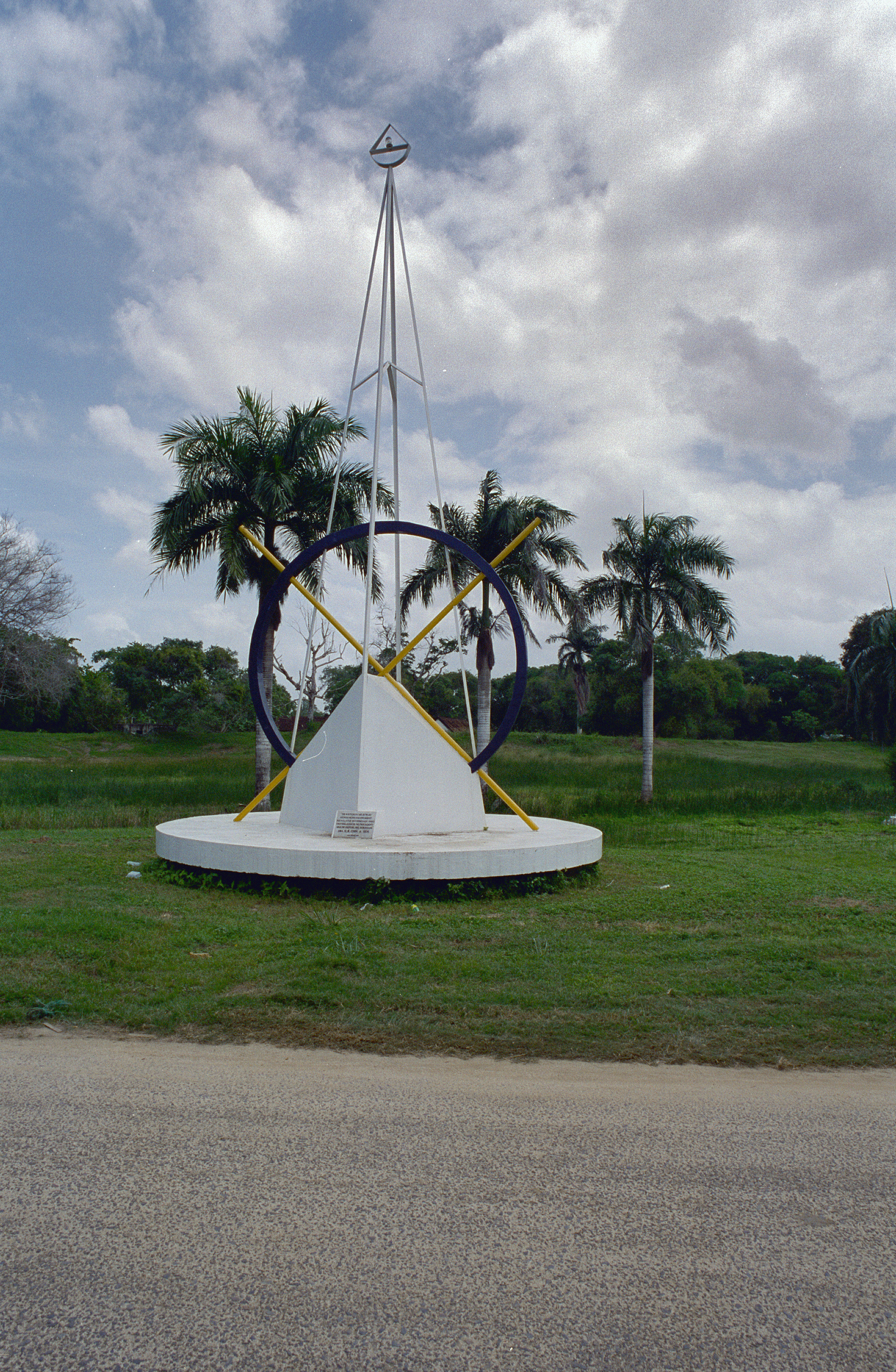
Monument commemorating the coup.

After becoming president of Suriname, Bouterse designated 25 February, the anniversary of the day of the coup d'état, as a national holiday. On the day of the coup, Bouterse's soldiers burned down the Central Police Station of Suriname. The remains of the building now form the Monument of the Revolution, where the wreath-laying ceremony would be held.

Bouterse's party lost the 2020 election, and the new government did away with the February 25 public holiday.
