= Dési Bouterse =

Leader of Suriname (1980–1987; 1990–1991; 2010–2020)

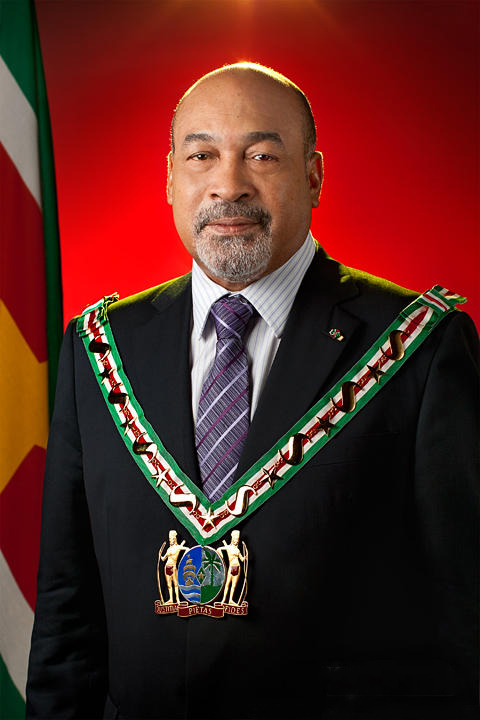
- Official portrait, 2010

8th President of Suriname
- In office 12 August 2010 – 16 July 2020
- Vice President: Robert Ameerali (2010–2015); Ashwin Adhin (2015–2020)
- Preceded by: Ronald Venetiaan
- Succeeded by: Chan Santokhi

Leader of Suriname
- De facto 29 December 1990 – 16 September 1991
- President: Johan Kraag
- Preceded by: Ivan Graanoogst
- Succeeded by: Ronald Venetiaan

Chairman of the National Military Council
- In office 25 February 1980 – 27 November 1987
- President: Johan Ferrier; Henk Chin A Sen; Fred Ramdat Misier
- Preceded by: Position established; Johan Ferrier (as President)
- Succeeded by: Position abolished; Fred Ramdat Misier (as President)

President pro tempore of the Union of South American Nations
- In office 30 August 2013 – 4 December 2014
- Preceded by: Ollanta Humala
- Succeeded by: José Mujica

President of the National Democratic Party
- In office 4 July 1987 – 13 July 2024
- Preceded by: Party established
- Succeeded by: Jennifer Geerlings-Simons

Personal details
- Born: Desiré Delano Bouterse; 13 October 1945 Domburg, Suriname
- Died: 23 December 2024 (aged 79) Copi Nature Reserve, Suriname
- Party: National Democratic
- Spouses: Ingrid Figueira (m. 1970; sep. 1990) Ingrid Waldring (m. 1990)
- Children: 3, including Dino
- Nickname: Dési

Military service
- Allegiance: Netherlands (until 1975); Suriname (from 1975)
- Branch/service: Royal Netherlands Army (until 1975); Surinamese Land Forces (from 1975)
- Years of service: 1968–1992
- Rank: Lieutenant general

Desiré "Dési" Delano Bouterse (Note: Dutch pronunciation: [ˈdeːsi ˈbʌutərsə]) (13 October 1945 – 23 December 2024) was a Surinamese military officer, politician and revolutionary who served as the eighth president of Suriname from 2010 to 2020, having previously led the country twice after a coup as a military leader from 1980 to 1987 and again from 1990 to 1991. He was the founding president of the National Democratic Party (NDP) from 1987 to 2024.

Bouterse was a controversial figure, held responsible by some for numerous human rights violations committed during his military rule in the 1980s. Most notable were the December murders in 1982. He was prosecuted for the murders, and a trial was initiated, but the National Assembly extended amnesty to him in 2012. After the trial was forced to continue, he was sentenced to 20 years in prison on 29 November 2019. He was also suspected of having directed the Moiwana massacre in 1986 against a village of Maroons during the Surinamese Interior War which pitted his government first against the maroon guerrilla group Jungle Commando, led by his former bodyguard, Ronnie Brunswijk, and then against the indigenous group Tucayana Amazonas.

On 16 July 1999, Bouterse was sentenced in absentia in the Netherlands to 11 years' imprisonment after being convicted of trafficking 474 kg (1,045 lb) of cocaine. Bouterse always maintained his innocence. He claimed the star witness in the case, Patrick van Loon, was bribed by the Dutch government. According to the United States diplomatic cables leak released in 2011, Bouterse was active in the drug trade until 2006. Europol issued a warrant for his arrest. At that time, he could not be arrested in Suriname, because he was still president. As the conviction came before his election as president, he risked arrest if he left Suriname.

In 2023, he was sentenced to twenty years' imprisonment for the 1982 murders of fifteen political dissidents. He was reported missing by the Surinamese authorities in January 2024 after refusing to report to prison. He was considered a fugitive until his death.

Bouterse died on 23 December 2024, at the age of 79, while on the run following his conviction.

== Early life ==
Desiré Delano Bouterse was born on 13 October 1945 in Domburg, located in Suriname's Wanica District. He was born in a multiracial family of Amerindian, African, Dutch, French, and Chinese ancestry. As a young boy he moved from Domburg to the capital Paramaribo, where he was raised by an aunt. He attended St. Jozefschool (a Catholic boarding school), and later the Middelbare Handelsschool (roughly equivalent to upper-secondary vocational education in business and administration), which he did not finish.

In 1968, Bouterse moved to the Netherlands, where he was conscripted into the armed forces of the Netherlands (Nederlandse Krijgsmacht). After completing his military service, he signed up to train as a non-commissioned officer at the Koninklijke Militaire School in Weert. In this period, Bouterse became known as an athlete, and he was chosen as head of the basketball team.

In 1970, Bouterse married Ingrid Figueira, whom he had known as a teenager in Suriname. They had two children: Peggy and Dino. Shortly after the marriage, Bouterse was assigned to the Dutch military base in Seedorf, Germany.

On 11 November 1975, Bouterse returned with his family to Suriname after it gained independence from the Netherlands. He wanted to help establish the Surinamese army. In 1979, Bouterse accepted a request by Roy Horb to become chairman of a new Surinamese military workers' union (Bomika; Bond voor Militair Kader).

== Sergeants Coup ==
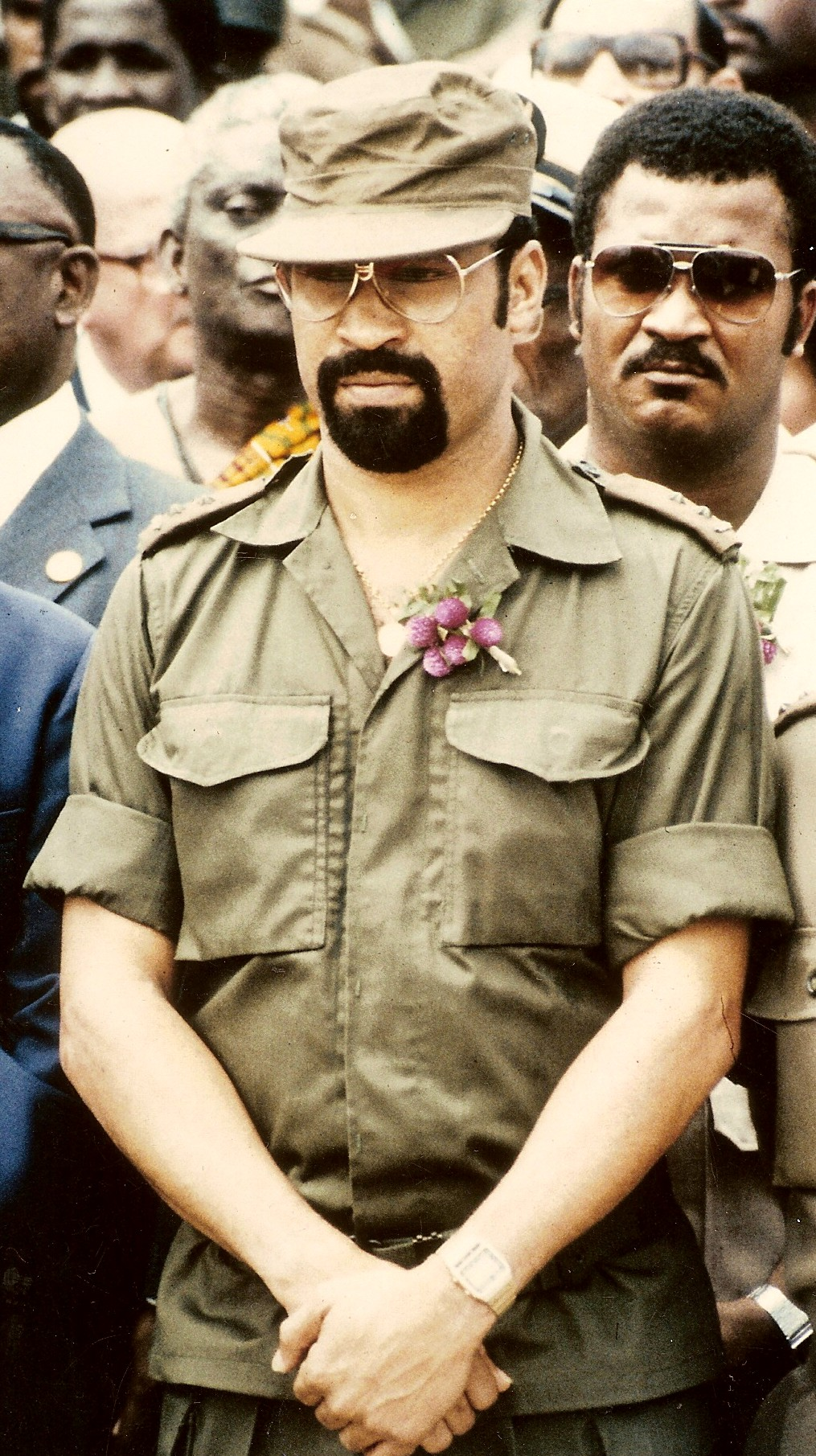
Bouterse as the Commander of the Armed Forces in 1985

On 25 February 1980, Bouterse, Horb, and fourteen other sergeants overthrew the Henck Arron government with a violent military coup d'état, now known as the Sergeants Coup. The sergeants who accomplished this coup were known as the Groep van zestien (Group of Sixteen), led by Bouterse. After the coup, he became chairman of the National Military Council of Suriname and as such the de facto dictator of Suriname. From then until 1988, Bouterse was the power behind puppet presidents installed by him.

The military takeover, which was widely supported by the population, was officially aimed at fighting corruption and unemployment (which at the time affected 18 per cent of the working population), and at restoring order in public affairs. However, "the political plans were vague, no ideological discussions had taken place in preparation for the coup," notes historian Rosemarijn Hoefte.

On the day of the coup, Bouterse's soldiers burned down the Central Police Station of Suriname. The remains of this building now form the "monument of the Revolution". Annually, on 25 February, the coup is commemorated.

The military dictatorship imposed an evening curfew, and curtailed freedom of press (only one newspaper, de Ware Tijd, was allowed to continue publishing, but was subject to heavy censorship). In 1985, it banned political parties and restricted freedom of assembly. It was characterised by a high level of government corruption and the summary executions of political opponents. After the December murders of fifteen opponents in 1982, Bouterse closed the University of Suriname.

He established diplomatic relations with the Soviet Union, Cuba and North Korea, but his regime did not show any Communist orientation. The Netherlands suspended development aid to its former colony, destabilising the Surinamese economy. At the same time, the fall in bauxite prices, Suriname's main export, accentuated the economic crisis. The regime was quickly confronted with several uprisings, sometimes led by part of the army, sometimes by civilians. In 1983, in the wake of the U.S. invasion of Grenada, Suriname drew closer to Washington and expelled Cuban diplomats, perhaps for fear of U.S. aggression.

== December murders ==
On 7 and 8 December 1982, fifteen prominent Surinamese men who had criticised Bouterse's military dictatorship or were connected with the coup d'état attempt on 11 March 1982, were brought to Fort Zeelandia (then Bouterse's headquarters), where they were tortured and shot dead. These killings are known as the December murders.

The 15 victims were:

- John Baboeram, lawyer
- Bram Behr, journalist
- Cyrill Daal, union leader
- Kenneth Gonçalves, lawyer
- Eddy Hoost, lawyer
- André Kamperveen, journalist and businessman
- Gerard Leckie, university teacher
- Sugrim Oemrawsingh, scientist
- Lesley Rahman, journalist
- Surendre Rambocus, military
- Harold Riedewald, lawyer
- Jiwansingh Sheombar, military
- Jozef Slagveer, journalist
- Robby Sohansingh, businessman
- Frank Wijngaarde, journalist (with Dutch citizenship)

On 10 December 1982 Bouterse stated on STVS television channel that 15 arrested "suspects who were plotting to overthrow the government later in December were shot dead while trying to flee Fort Zeelandia". Years later Bouterse said that he was not present at the killings. In 2000 he stated that the decision for these killings was made by the commander of the battalion, Paul Bhagwandas, who died in 1996. Bouterse accepted political responsibility as leader, but still denied any direct involvement.

The trials for the December murders did not take place in Suriname until 30 November 2007. Among the 25 indicted suspects, Bouterse is the chief figure. Since the trial began, Bouterse never went to court. In a speech, Bouterse said “I want to apologise to all the relatives of the victims. But to think you can lock me up? Never, niemals, jamais, nunca.” In an interview with Al Jazeera in 2009, Bouterse said that the trial was being used by his political opponents to prevent him from running for office again and for their own political gain. In April 2012, two months before the verdict in the trial was expected, Bouterse's party member Andre Misiekaba said, during a debate in the Surinamese parliament, that: "The December Murders trial is a political trial which has the purpose to eliminate Bouterse from the political arena and therefore the Amnesty Act is needed."

=== Amnesty ===
On 1 February 2012, Ruben Rozendaal, one of the military suspects, announced in local media that it was time for him to come forward with the truth about the December Murders because he wanted to clear his name before he died: he was suffering from a severe kidney disease, and the doctors had told him he did not have much time left to live. After consulting with his lawyer, Rozendaal decided to withdraw the testimony he had given in 2010. After the last suspects and witnesses in the December Murders case were heard, the court-martial decided to hear Rozendaal again, and this hearing was set for 23 March 2012.

On 19 March, five members of Bouterse's political party Megacombinatie and one member of Paul Somohardjo's party Pertjajah Luhur proposed a law in the parliament which in effect would grant amnesty for the suspects in the December Murders, including Dési Bouterse. The amnesty law would also cause immediate termination of the trial. The parliamentary voting was to be held on 23 March, the same day Ruben Rozendaal testified in court that Bouterse personally killed two of the fifteen men: union leader Cyrill Daal and military member Soerindre Rambocus. That day there was no quorum in the parliament, and the voting did not continue.

On 4 April 2012, after three days of debate, the Assembly passed the amnesty law with 28 votes in favour and 12 votes opposed. The political parties Nieuw Suriname and BEP, both members of Bouterse's coalition, left the room when the voting started because they "did not believe that they should support a law which is being opposed by a large part of the Surinamese community." The chair of the Surinamese parliament, Jennifer Geerlings-Simons, who is also a member of Bouterse's party, voted for the law.

The controversial law granted amnesty to Bouterse and the 24 other suspects. This could also mean that the ongoing December Murders trial will face an immediate stop.

On 13 April 2012, the public prosecutor in the December Murders trial formulated the demanded sentence against five suspects, including the main suspect, Bouterse. His defence lawyer, Irwin Kanhai, requested that the trial would be declared moot because of the amnesty law. On 11 May 2012, the court decided whether the trial would continue or not.

Edgar Ritfeld, one of the 25 suspects, said that he did not want amnesty because he knows he is innocent. He wanted the trial to be continued so that his innocence could be proven. Ruben Rozendaal and Wim Carbiere, both suspects, also asked for continuation of the trial.

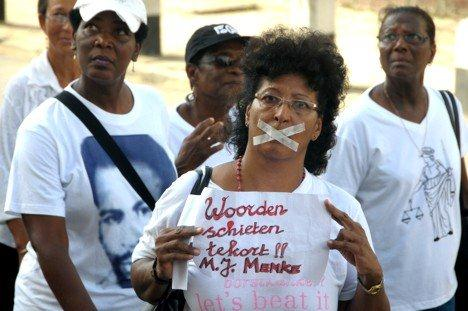
Thousands of people in Paramaribo conduct a silent march on 10 April 2012 against the amnesty law

The controversial amnesty law was protested both nationally and internationally. Organisations such as the United Nations, Human Rights Watch, Amnesty International, Reporters Without Borders and the Inter-American Commission on Human Rights condemned the law and urged the Surinamese judges and the Public Prosecutor's Office to continue the trial. On 19 April 2012, Human Rights Watch demanded an immediate retraction of the law.

=== Reaction from the Netherlands ===
After passage of the amnesty law, the Netherlands immediately stopped the 20 million euro aid set aside for Suriname. President Bouterse was unmoved by this decision, saying, "I never asked you for 20 million euros. We have economic reserves of almost 800 million dollars". The Dutch Labour Party and the then ruling People's Party for Freedom and Democracy (VVD) believed that this sanction was not enough. They called for more penalties such as economic sanctions, expulsion of the Surinamese ambassador (who is the daughter of MP Rashied Doekhi, one of the 28 MPs who voted in favour of the law), and a ban on European travel for all the Surinamese parliamentarians who voted for the amnesty law. Dutch minister of foreign affairs Uri Rosenthal did not agree with these requests.

On 8 April 2012, the Dutch prime minister Mark Rutte said it was "indigestible" that amnesty was granted to the suspects in this stage of the trial (the amnesty law was passed two months before the verdict in the trial).

=== 2019 conviction by the military court ===
The amnesty law was later overturned by a military court in 2016, and in November 2019 the military court convicted Bouterse to 20 years imprisonment for the December killings. On 22 January 2020, Bouterse appeared before the court, in military uniform, to appeal this decision. On 20 December 2023, Suriname's Supreme Court upheld Bouterse's conviction. He could still request a pardon to Suriname's president Chan Santokhi, who investigated the December killings as a police commissioner, and later pushed for the investigation to continue as justice minister.

On 8 January 2024, Bouterse filed another appeal against his conviction, which was rejected the next day by the Attorney-General. On 12 January, a manhunt was launched against Bouterse after he failed to turn himself in to prison authorities.

== Moiwana massacre ==
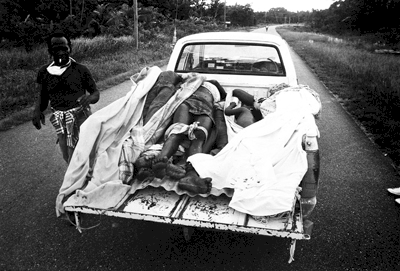
Moiwana massacre victims

Moiwana is a Maroon village in the Marowijne District in the east of Suriname.

The Suriname Guerrilla War (1986–1990), also known as a civil war, was between the Surinamese military regime, headed by Dési Bouterse, and the Surinamese Liberation Army, a guerrilla Maroon group better known as the Jungle Commando, led by Bouterse's former bodyguard Ronnie Brunswijk. On 29 November 1986, members of the national military massacred at least 39 villagers of Moiwana, Brunswijk's home village, killing mostly women and children. The soldiers also burned down the village dwellings, including Brunswijk's house. The survivors fled as refugees with hundreds of other inland inhabitants across the Marowijne River to neighbouring French Guiana.

The human rights organisation 'Moiwana '86' has committed itself to achieving justice with regard to this event. It is seeking to hold military officers and the government as responsible for the massacre.

Herman Gooding, a chief inspector of the police, was assassinated in August 1990 during his investigation of the massacre. Reportedly he was forced out of his car near Fort Zeelandia and shot in the head. His body was left outside the office of Dési Bouterse. Other police investigators fled the country for safety, stalling the progress of the investigation.

The government has stated that it is still continuing its investigation of the massacre. It claimed that prospective witnesses had either moved, died, or were uncooperative. It has also said that an investigation of the murder of Herman Gooding was continuing.

In August 2005, the Inter-American Court of Human Rights ordered Suriname to pay US$3 million in compensation to 130 survivors of the massacre, and to establish a US$1.2 million fund for the development of Moiwana. The Inter-American Court of Human rights has judged that the responsible persons have to be prosecuted and punished; however, previous governments, including Bouterse's government, have failed to do so.

== Transition to democracy ==
Later in 1985, the government lifted the ban on opposition parties, beginning a transition to civilian rule. A new constitution was overwhelmingly approved in a 30 September 1987 referendum. Elections were held two months later, and Ramsewak Shankar, an opponent of Bouterse, was elected president in January 1988.

However, Bouterse retained much power as army commander. He scuttled a number of government efforts to negotiate with the Jungle Commando, and a number of Bouterse's opponents were murdered or disappeared. Matters came to a head when Bouterse was detained at Schiphol Airport while returning to Suriname on a personal trip to Ghana and Switzerland. Angered that Shankar, who happened to be on the same flight to Amsterdam, didn't protest, Bouterse resigned as army commander. The following day, Ivan Graanoogst, who was serving as acting army commander, called Shankar and forced his resignation. By all accounts, however, Bouterse was the mastermind of what became known as the Telephone Coup. A year later, new elections were held that returned the country to civilian rule.

== Drug trafficking ==
On 16 July 1999, Bouterse was convicted in absentia in the Netherlands to 11 years in prison for trafficking 474 kilograms of cocaine. Bouterse always proclaimed his innocence. He claimed that the star witness in his case, Patrick van Loon, was bribed by the Dutch government. Bouterse is believed by law enforcement officials to have been the leader of the so-called Suri kartel, which is held responsible for the trafficking and smuggling of large amounts of cocaine from Suriname and Brazil into Europe (especially into the Netherlands) in the 1980s and 90s.

Since 1999 Europol has maintained an international warrant for his arrest. According to the United Nations Convention against illicit Traffic in Narcotic Drugs and Psychotropic Substances, since Bouterse was convicted before his election as head of state in 2010, he has no immunity under international law. This was confirmed by various specialists in international law.

In April 2012, Ruben Rozendaal, former fellow soldier of Bouterse and also a suspect in the December 1982 murders, said that in the 1980s and early 1990s, Bouterse supplied the FARC of Colombia with weapons in exchange for cocaine. A 2006 document from the American embassy reported a possible connection between Bouterse and the FARC.

Bouterse's son Dino Bouterse was sentenced in 2005 to eight years' imprisonment in a Surinamese court for narcotics trafficking, weapons trafficking, and theft of luxury vehicles. He was released early for good behaviour. The government's counter-terrorism department appointed him to a senior role.

On 29 August 2013, Dino was arrested by the U.S. government's Drug Enforcement Administration in Panama while travelling on a diplomatic passport. He was extradited to the United States and taken to New York City. He was prosecuted and in March 2015, he was sentenced to a 16-year prison term on convictions of drug smuggling and trying to help Hezbollah set up a base in Suriname. In a letter, Dino Bouterse insisted he had no terrorist leanings and was motivated only by profit. Bouterse was arrested after an elaborate international sting in which he was recorded meeting in Greece and Panama with DEA operatives posing as Hezbollah and Mexican drug traffickers. He is currently held at FCA Yazoo City Low.

== President of Suriname (2010–2020) ==
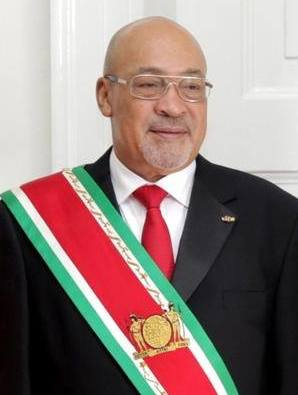
Bouterse in 2015

After the return of democratic government, led in succession by Ronald Venetiaan, Jules Wijdenbosch, and Venetiaan again, Bouterse tried repeatedly to return to power through elections. In the 2010 Surinamese legislative election, Bouterse and his coalition, the Mega Combination (Mega Combinatie) became the largest bloc in the National Assembly, gaining 23 of the 51 seats. The coalition failed to gain an absolute majority in the parliament by three seats (the half of 50 plus 1 was needed). In order to secure the necessary two-thirds supermajority to become president, Bouterse cooperated with the party of his former opponent, Ronnie Brunswijk, which had 7 seats; and the Peoples Alliance party (Volks Alliantie) of Paul Somohardjo (6 seats), who had left the ruling New Front party before the election.

On 19 July 2010, Bouterse was elected president with 36 of the 51 votes; he assumed office on 12 August 2010. His running mate Robert Ameerali became Vice President of Suriname.

During his presidency Dési Bouterse introduced universal health care, free school meals, a minimum wage and a national pension scheme. At the same time, rising government expenditures led to large budget deficits and rampant inflation, while the Surinamese dollar was devalued several times in 2016 by more than half of its value.

His cabinet consisted of the following members:

Ministry	Minister
Labor, Technological Development & Environment	Michael Miskin
Interior Affairs	Edmund Leilis
Foreign Affairs	Winston Lackin (NDP)
Defence	Lamure Latour (NDP)
Finance & Planning	Andy Rusland (NDP)
Trade & Industry	Don Soejit Tosendjojo (abop)
Justice & Police	Edward Belfort (ABOP)
Agriculture	Soeresh Algoe
Natural Resources	Jim Hok (PALU)
Education	Ashwin Adhin (NDP)
Public Works & Traffic	Rabin Parmessar (NDP)
Regional Development	Stanley Betterson (ABOP)
Spatial Planning, Land- & Forest Management	Steven Relyveld (NDP)
Social Affairs & Housing	Alice Amafo (ABOP)
Sport- & Youth Affairs	Ismanto Adna (KTPI)
Transport, Communication & Tourism	Falisie Pinas (ABOP)
Public Health	Michel Blokland

The first minister of Spatial Planning Martinus Sastroredjo (KTPI) had been relieved of his duties at the end of 2010 due to his life partner asking for a piece of land with the help of a ministry official. He was succeeded by Simon Martosatiman, also a member of the political party KTPI. The second minister to leave office for personal reasons was Miss Wonnie Boedhoe, the first minister of Finance & Planning of this cabinet.

By the end of April 2011, several ministers had been dismissed due to political changes in the cabinet. They included Paul Abena (Sport- & Youth Affairs), Martin Misiedjan (Justice & Police), Celsius Waterberg (Public Health), Linus Diko (Regional Development), and Simon Martosatiman. The ministers Raymond Sapoen, Michael Miskin and Ginmardo Kromosoeto were assigned to new posts. In addition to the newly formed cabinet, two deputy ministers were installed. Mahinder Gopie had served as the secretary of the president and was made the deputy minister of Regional Development. Abigail Lie A Kwie, a loyalist of Pertjajah Luhur chairman Paul Somohardjo, started as the deputy minister of Public Works & Traffic, but was moved in October 2012 to the ministry of Agriculture.

The president's four top advisors were Jules Wijdenbosch, who handles the country's administrative and constitutional affairs; Errol Alibux, who advises the president about foreign affairs and international laws; Eddy Jozefzoon, who deals with the country's social and educational issues; and Andy Rusland, who oversees the nation's economy. The president appointed Cliffton Limburg as his press secretary and cabinet's spokesman; he was a propagandist for Bouterse and a talkshow host. Bouterse installed Gillmore Hoefdraad, a former International Monetary Fund (IMF) official, as the new governor of the Central Bank of Suriname.

After the 2015 Surinamese legislative election, Bouterse's NDP won 26 seats; he was reelected unopposed on 14 July 2015.

On 23 June 2020, Bouterse announced that he did not want to take his seat in the National Assembly even though he had been elected in the 2020 Surinamese general election. As such, Soewarto Moestadja, who was on seventh place on the NDP list, had become eligible for taking the seat in the National Assembly. Moestadja, being the oldest member, chaired the first meeting of the Assembly. Bouterse was not a candidate for the presidency in the 2020 elections, and as no other candidates other than Chan Santokhi had been nominated by the deadline of 8 July 2020 at 15:00 (UTC−3), Santokhi was elected as his successor on 13 July in an uncontested election. Bouterse announced his retirement from politics on 16 July 2020.

=== Honouring of the coup and handling of the December murders ===
After his inauguration as president, Bouterse immediately honoured the nine surviving conspirators, who together with him had conducted the violent 1980 Surinamese coup d'état; he awarded them the Grand Cordon of the Honorary Order of the Yellow Star, the highest honor of Suriname. This action was met with international outrage, all nine (and Bouterse) having been involved with the December murders.

After becoming president, Bouterse designated 25 February, the anniversary of the coup d'état, as a national holiday. Former president Ronald Venetiaan has said that 25 February should not be a holiday, but a national day of mourning.

Bouterse also awarded suspects in the December murders with high-level government positions. During his presidency, he publicly threatened judges investigating the case and unsuccessfully tried to remove the attorney-general.

=== Pardons ===
In December 2011, President Bouterse granted a pardon to his foster son Romano Meriba, who in 2005 was convicted to 15 years' imprisonment for the 2002 murder and robbery of a Chinese trader. Meriba was also convicted for throwing a hand grenade at the house of the Dutch ambassador. Judge Valstein-Montnor ruled that the evidence proved that Meriba tried to commit a robbery at the ambassador's house similar to that of the trader. After it was prevented by guards from the Dutch embassy, Meriba threw a hand grenade from a car at the ambassador's residence.

The pardon was controversial, as it is the first time a Surinamese President has pardoned someone convicted of murder and robbery. "People that have committed such heavy offends should not get a pardon" said former justice minister Chan Santokhi. "Besides, the requirement that a thorough investigation must be conducted and that the decision should be based on the advice by the judge who passed the sentence was ignored." Bouterse's staff said that Meriba's status as the foster son of President Bouterse was not part of the decision, and that there were strong legal arguments for the pardon. According to rumours, after Meriba was released from jail, he was hired by the heavily armed Counter Terror Unit (CTU). Dino Bouterse, son of President Bouterse, was appointed to head this unit.

Bouterse hired other convicts. His delegation that visited a South American summit had two members besides Bouterse who had criminal drug records: former military Etienne Boerenveen and Hans Jannasch. Ronald Venetiaan, former president of Suriname, said "Such people now circulate around the state power".

Meriba was arrested again on 23 March 2012 in Paramaribo on charges of assaulting a citizen and police officer the night before in a nightclub. He was not long held in police custody because the complaint was retracted the following day.

== Illness and death ==
Presumed last hideout (Suriname)

During his presidency, Bouterse underwent routine medical checkups in Cuba. After returning from a month-long stay in the island in September 2017, his office acknowledged that he had undergone surgery for an undisclosed condition.

Bouterse died following a short illness on 23 December 2024, at the age of 79, while he was in hiding at an undisclosed location in Suriname to avoid imprisonment for his conviction in the December murders. An autopsy later found that he had died from a "liver failure complication from serious liver fibrosis caused by chronic alcohol consumption". Dutch news outlets reported that Bouterse hid in the Copi Nature Reserve, 50 kilometres (30 miles) from Paramaribo. His body was subsequently taken to his residence in Paramaribo on 25 December. Following his death, President Chan Santokhi announced that no period of national mourning or a state funeral was to be held, although Foreign Minister Albert Ramdin said that flags in government buildings were to be set at half-mast on the day of his funeral out of respect for Bouterse being a former president. Bouterse's National Democratic Party said that his remains would be cremated.

== Notes ==
Military offices
New office	Chairman of the National Military Council; 1980–1987	Office abolished
Party political offices
New political party	President of the National Democratic Party; 1987–2024	Succeeded by Jennifer Geerlings-Simons
Political offices
Preceded by Ronald Venetiaan	President of Suriname; 2010–2020	Succeeded by Chan Santokhi
Diplomatic posts
Preceded by Ollanta Humala	President pro tempore of UNASUR; 2013–2014	Succeeded by José Mujica
