= List of Surinamese cabinets =

The Cabinet of Ministers in Suriname is appointed by the President of Suriname.

== List ==
	President	Vice President	Years
Arron I cabinet	Johan Ferrier (NPS)	Henck Arron (NPS)	1975 to 1977
Arron II cabinet	Johan Ferrier (NPS)	Henck Arron (NPS)	1977 to 1980
Chin A Sen I cabinet	Johan Ferrier (NPS)	Henk Chin A Sen (PNR)	1980 to 1980
Chin A Sen II cabinet	Henk Chin A Sen (PNR)	Henk Chin A Sen (PNR)	1980 to 1982
Neijhorst cabinet	Fred Ramdat Misier (independent)	Henry Neijhorst (independent)	1982 to 1983
Alibux cabinet	Fred Ramdat Misier (independent)	Errol Alibux (PALU)	1983 to 1984
Udenhout I cabinet	Fred Ramdat Misier (independent)	Wim Udenhout (independent)	1984 to 1985
Udenhout II cabinet	Fred Ramdat Misier (independent)	Wim Udenhout (independent)	1985 to 1986
Radhakishun cabinet	Fred Ramdat Misier (independent)	Pretaap Radhakishun (VHP)	1986 to 1987
Wijdenbosch I cabinet	Fred Ramdat Misier (independent)	Jules Wijdenbosch (NDP)	1987 to 1988
Shankar cabinet	Ramsewak Shankar (VHP)	Henck Arron (NPS)	1988 to 1990
Kraag cabinet	Johan Kraag (NPS)	Jules Wijdenbosch (NDP)	1990 to 1991
Venetiaan I cabinet	Ronald Venetiaan (NPS)	Jules Ajodhia (VHP)	1991 to 1996
Wijdenbosch II cabinet	Jules Wijdenbosch (NDP)	Pretaap Radhakishun (BVD)	1996 to 2000
Venetiaan II cabinet	Ronald Venetiaan (NPS)	Jules Ajodhia (VHP)	2000 to 2005
Venetiaan III cabinet	Ronald Venetiaan (NPS)	Ramdien Sardjoe (VHP)	2005 to 2010
Bouterse I cabinet	Desi Bouterse (NDP)	Robert Ameerali (ABOP)	2010 to 2015
Bouterse II cabinet	Desi Bouterse (NDP)	Ashwin Adhin (NDP)	2015 to 2020
Santokhi cabinet	Chan Santokhi (VHP)	Ronnie Brunswijk (ABOP)	2020 to present
