= Vice President of Suriname =

Deputy head of state and deputy head of government of Suriname

Vice President of the Republic of Suriname
- Vicepresident van de Republiek Suriname
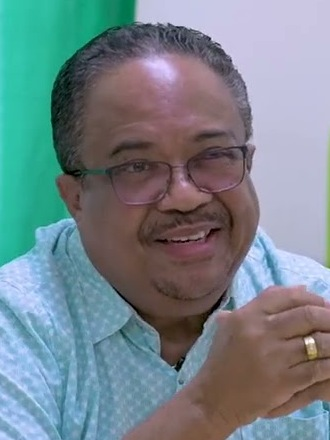
- Incumbent; Gregory Rusland since 16 July 2025
- Style: His Excellency
- Appointer: National Assembly
- Term length: Five years, renewable indefinitely
- Precursor: Prime Minister
- Inaugural holder: Henck Arron
- Formation: 25 January 1988; 38 years ago
- Deputy: Deputy Vice President (1988–1990)
- Salary: US$116,870 annually
- Website: Cabinet of the Vice-President

The vice president of Suriname (Dutch: Vicepresident van de Republiek Suriname) is the second-highest political position in Suriname, after the president. The president and the vice president are elected by the National Assembly for five-year terms.

The position of vice president was created in the Constitution of 1987, when the position of prime minister of Suriname was abolished. The vice president is charged with the day-to-day management of the Council of Ministers and is responsible to the President.

The current vice president is Gregory Rusland. He is affiliated with the National Party of Suriname (NPS). Rusland was elected on 6 July 2025 as vice president by acclamation, and inaugurated on 16 July on the Onafhankelijkheidsplein in Paramaribo in a ceremony.

== Powers and duties ==
The powers of the president are exercised by the vice president:

1. In case the president is declared unfit to exercise his powers;
2. In case the president has laid down the exercise of his powers temporarily;
3. As long as there is no president or if he is absent;
4. If, in the case described in article 140, prosecution against the President has been initiated.

== List of vice presidents ==
Political parties

Party for National Unity and Solidarity (KTPI)
National Party of Suriname (NPS)
National Democratic Party (NDP)
Progressive Reform Party (VHP)
Basic Party for Renewal and Democracy (BVD)
General Liberation and Development Party (ABOP)

=== Vice President of Suriname (1988–present) ===
| No. | Portrait | Name (Birth–Death) | Term of office | | | Political party | President(s) | Ref. |
| No. | Portrait | Name (Birth–Death) | Took office | Left office | Time in office | Political party | President(s) | Ref. |
|---|---|---|---|---|---|---|---|---|
| 1 | | Henck Arron (1936–2000) | 25 January 1988 | 24 December 1990 (Note: Deposed in the Telephone Coup.) | 2 years, 333 days | NPS | Ramsewak Shankar (VHP) | |
| 2 | | Jules Wijdenbosch (1941–2025) | 7 January 1991 | 16 September 1991 | 252 days | NDP | Johan Kraag (NPS) | |
| 3 | | Jules Ajodhia (1945–2024) | 16 September 1991 | 15 September 1996 | 4 years, 365 days | VHP | Ronald Venetiaan (NPS) | |
| 4 | | Pretaap Radhakishun (1934–2001) | 15 September 1996 | 12 August 2000 | 3 years, 332 days | BVD | Jules Wijdenbosch (NDP) | |
| (3) | | Jules Ajodhia (1945–2024) | 12 August 2000 | 12 August 2005 | 5 years | VHP | Ronald Venetiaan (NPS) | |
| 5 | | Ramdien Sardjoe (born 1935) | 12 August 2005 | 12 August 2010 | 5 years | VHP | Ronald Venetiaan (NPS) | |
| 6 | | Robert Ameerali (born 1961) | 12 August 2010 | 12 August 2015 | 5 years | ABOP | Dési Bouterse (NDP) | |
| 7 | | Ashwin Adhin (born 1980) | 12 August 2015 | 16 July 2020 | 4 years, 339 days | NDP | Dési Bouterse (NDP) | |
| 8 | | Ronnie Brunswijk (born 1961) | 16 July 2020 | 16 July 2025 | 5 years | ABOP | Chan Santokhi (VHP) | |
| 9 | | Gregory Rusland (born 1959) | 16 July 2025 | Incumbent | 1 year, 91 days (as of 15 October 2026) | NPS | Jennifer Geerlings-Simons (NDP) | |

=== Deputy Vice President of Suriname (1988–1990) ===
| No. | Portrait | Name (Birth–Death) | Term of office | | | Political party | Vice president | Ref. |
| No. | Portrait | Name (Birth–Death) | Took office | Left office | Time in office | Political party | Vice president | Ref. |
|---|---|---|---|---|---|---|---|---|
| 1 | | Willy Soemita (1936–2022) | 25 January 1988 | 24 December 1990 | 2 years, 333 days | KTPI | Arron (NPS) | |

== See also ==
- Politics of Suriname
- List of colonial governors of Suriname
- President of Suriname
- First Lady of Suriname
- List of prime ministers of Suriname
- List of deputy prime ministers of Suriname
