= First Lady of Suriname =

Spouse of the president of Suriname

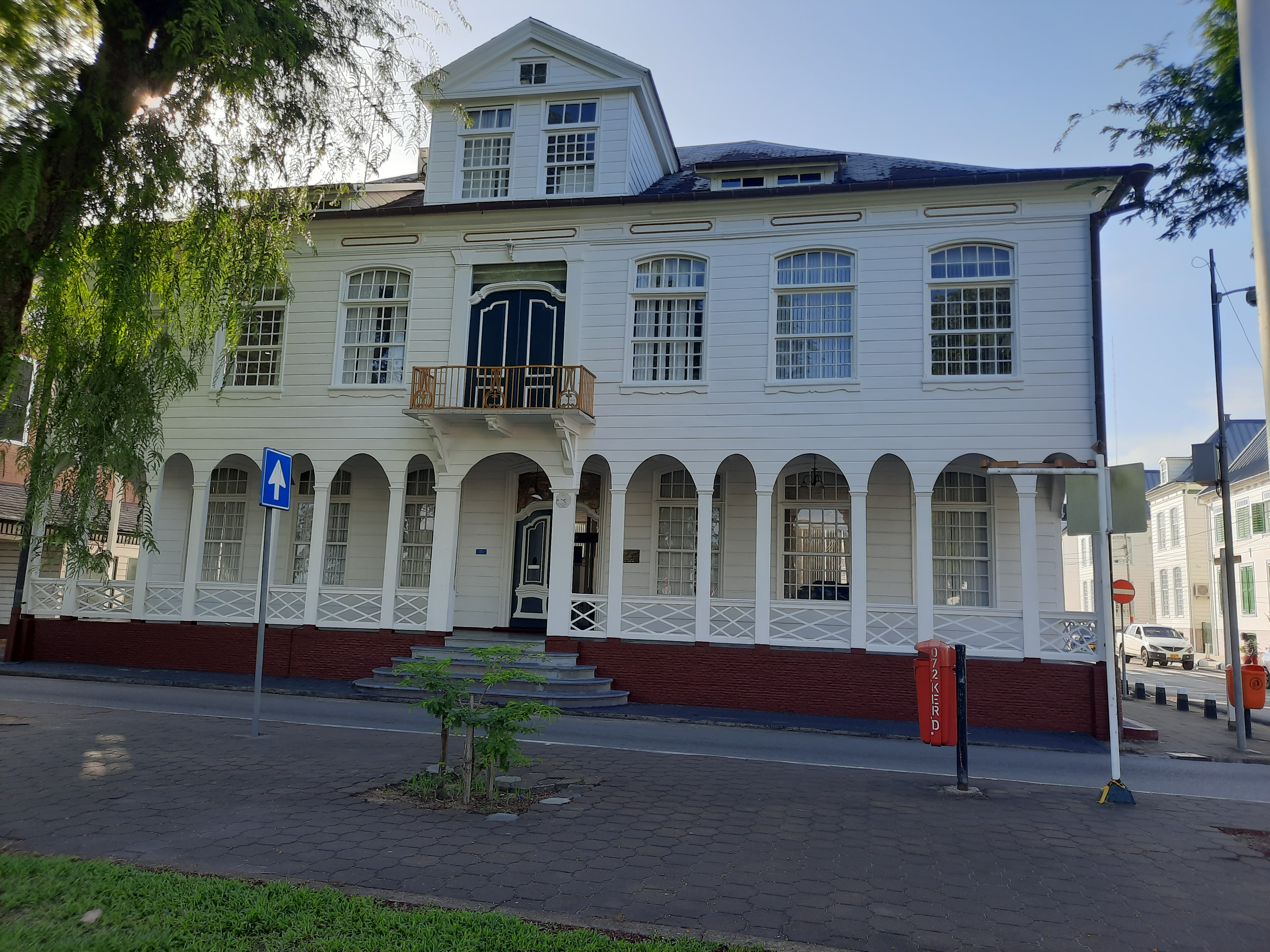
- residence at the Huis du Plesses
- Residence: Huis Du Plessis, Paramaribo
- Formation: 12 August 2010; 16 years ago
- First holder: Ingrid Bouterse-Waldring
- Final holder: Mellisa Santokhi-Seenacherry
- Abolished: 16 July 2025; 14 months ago

The First Lady of Suriname is a ceremonial designation used for two spouses of Surinamese presidents: Ingrid Bouterse-Waldring (2010–2020, wife of Desi Bouterse) and Mellisa Santokhi-Seenacherry (2020–2025, wife of Chan Santokhi). From 2010 to 2025, the First Ladies had their own office with a secretariat in the former Huis Du Plessis at the Onafhankelijkheidsplein.

Upon the inauguration of President Jennifer Geerlings-Simons, her husband Glenn Geerlings was discussed in terms of the designation "First Gentleman". However, they chose not to continue this tradition.

== Allowance and earlier period ==
In January 2011, Desi Bouterse enacted a presidential decree (Article 99 of the Constitution) stipulating that the First Lady should receive a remuneration. This was made retroactive to 12 August 2005, thereby also covering Liesbeth Venetiaan-Vanenburg (1991–1996, 2000–2010, wife of Ronald Venetiaan), who had performed her duties without compensation. The monthly allowance amounted to SRD 8,742 (EUR 2,956), equal to the salary of a member of the National Assembly.

Liesbeth Venetiaan-Vanenburg, however, informed Minister Soewarto Moestadja in a letter that she would not accept the money and was satisfied with the compensation she had received as a civil servant. She thereby declined an amount of approximately SRD 525,000 (EUR 177,000). Following her refusal, it was decided to amend the effective date from 2005 to 2010.

== Bureau of the First Lady (2011–2020) ==
Another change Bouterse implemented in early 2011 was to provide his wife with an Bureau of the First Lady, including a secretariat and a number of permanent staff to support her. He believed this was necessary because she had additional responsibilities, such as organizing campaigns in the fields of care (including home care and mental health), welfare, and youth services.

In 2016, Bouterse laid down the duties of the First Lady in a presidential decree. Bouterse described these tasks as follows: "She supports the president in performing ceremonial duties and further provides her support in communication, assistance, and aid activities. The term "First Lady" is not enshrined in the Constitution, and therefore, she bears no political responsibility.

== Institute of the First Lady (2020–2025) ==
On 31 August 2020, President Chan Santokhi issued a presidential decree transforming the Bureau into the Institute of the First Lady. At the same time, he established the seal of the institute, featuring the Coat of arms of Suriname in the center with the inscription around it: "First Lady Mellisa Santokhi-Seenacherry." He adopted the task description of the First Lady from Bouterse without modification.

== No First Gentleman ==
In her first press conference, President Jennifer Geerlings-Simons stated that there would be no First Gentleman: "We're not really into 'firsts'. Perhaps it's a personal view, but we have the president – Mrs. Simons or Mrs. Geerlings-Simons – and we have Mr. Geerlings, who will somewhat continue what he is already doing: promoting education, particularly agricultural education."

== Spouses of the President ==
Suriname has had presidents since its independence in 1975, but an elected president only since the 1987 Constitution, with the inauguration of Ramsewak Shankar.

No	Picture	Name	Tenure		President
		Edmé Vas	1975–1980	5 years	Johan Ferrier (m. ????)
		Sherlyne Chin A Sen	1980–1982	2 years	Henk Chin A Sen (m. ????)
		Hilda Doergade Deeanchand	1982–1988	6 years	Fred Ramdat Misier (m. ????)
		Vacant	1988–1990	2 years	Ramsewak Shankar (unmarried)
		Vacant	1990–1991	1 year	Johan Kraag (unmarried)
		Liesbeth Vanenburg	1991–1996	5 years	Ronald Venetiaan (m. 1966)
		Vacant	1996–2000	4 years	Jules Wijdenbosch (unmarried)
		Liesbeth Vanenburg	2000–2010	10 years	Ronald Venetiaan (m. 1966)
1		Ingrid Waldring	2010–2020	10 years	Dési Bouterse (m. 1990)
2		Mellisa Seenacherry	2020–2025	5 years	Chan Santokhi (m. 2020)
		Glenn Geerlings	2025–present	1 year	Jennifer Geerlings-Simons (m. 1981)

== See also ==
- List of spouses of heads of state
- President of Suriname#List of presidents
