= President of Suriname =

Head of state and government

President of the Republic of Suriname
- President van de Republiek Suriname (Dutch)
- Standard of the president of Suriname

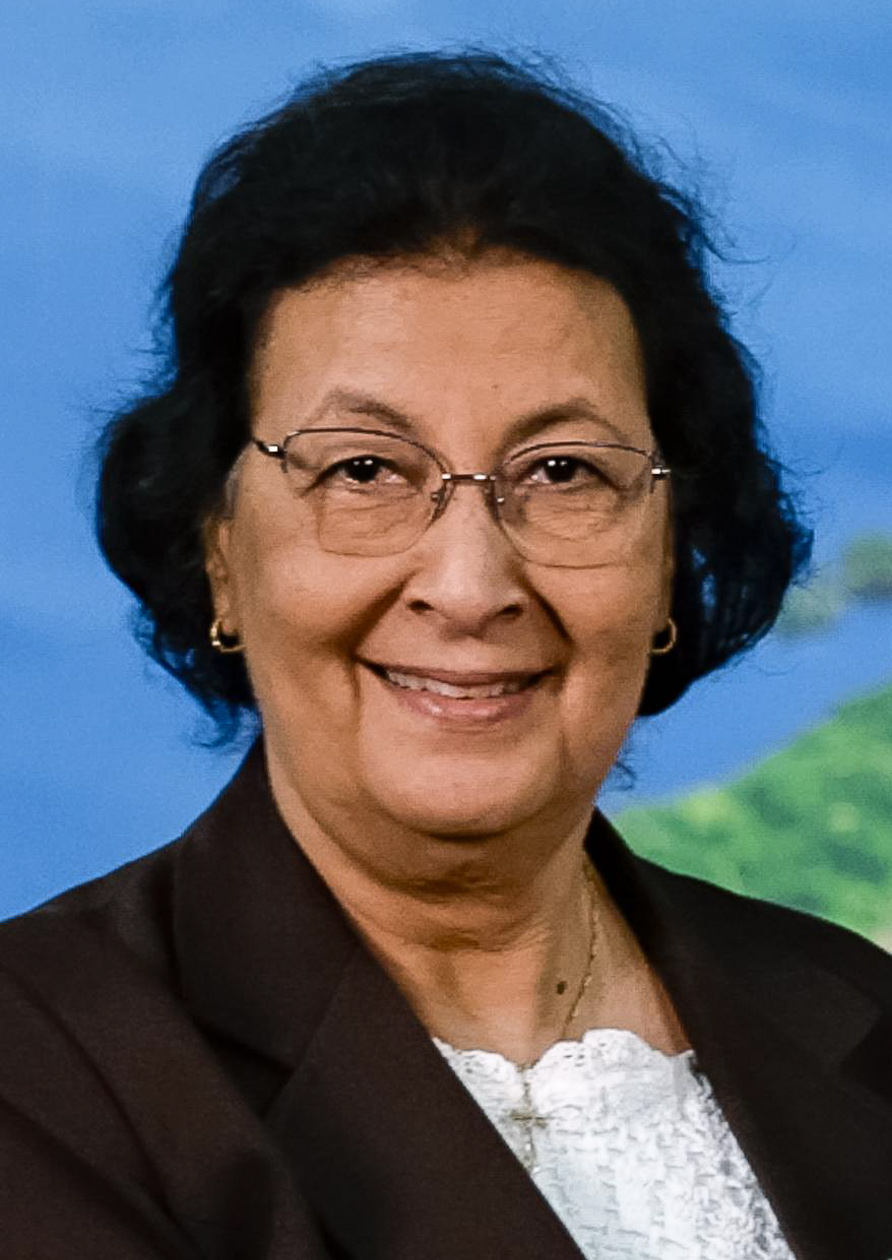
- Incumbent; Jennifer Geerlings-Simons since 16 July 2025
- Style: Madam President (Informal); Her Excellency Dr. (Diplomatic)
- Status: Head of state Head of government
- Residence: Presidential Palace
- Seat: Paramaribo
- Appointer: National Assembly
- Term length: Five years, renewable indefinitely
- Constituting instrument: Constitution of Suriname (1987)
- Precursor: Governor-General
- Inaugural holder: Johan Ferrier
- Formation: 25 November 1975; 50 years ago
- Deputy: Vice President
- Salary: SR$4,646,552 / US$133,560 annually
- Website: Cabinet of the President

The President of the Republic of Suriname (Dutch: President van de Republiek Suriname) is, in accordance with the Constitution of 1987, the head of state and head of government of Suriname, and commander-in-chief of the Suriname National Army (SNL). The president also appoints a cabinet.

The current president is Jennifer Geerlings-Simons, a former chairwoman of the National Assembly. She is affiliated with the National Democratic Party (NDP). Simons was elected on 6 July 2025 as president by acclamation, and inaugurated on 16 July on the Onafhankelijkheidsplein in Paramaribo in a ceremony.

== History ==
The office of president was created upon independence from the Netherlands in 1975. Until 1987, the presidency was mostly a ceremonial post, discharging most of the functions previously vested in the monarchy of the Netherlands. For all intents and purposes, real power was vested in the prime minister.

The first officeholder was Johan Ferrier, a schoolteacher and veteran politician who had served as governor since 1968. He resigned as president in August 1980, several months after a coup d'état. From then until 1988, the presidents were essentially army-installed puppets of army commander Dési Bouterse, who ruled as a de facto military dictator with few practical checks on his power.

Bouterse allowed multiparty elections in 1987, shortly after the current constitution was approved in a referendum. The presidency became an executive post, with duties and responsibilities similar to those of presidents in semi-presidential republics. On 24 December 1990, two days after Bouterse's resignation as army commander, the army called president Ramsewak Shankar to inform him that he and his cabinet were removed from office, in another coup d'état; police chief and acting army commander Ivan Graanoogst was appointed acting president. On 27 December 1990, Johannes Kraag became the president. The army returned power to civilians in 1991, and the president has been freely elected ever since.

== Election ==
The president and a vice president are elected by no less than a two-thirds supermajority of members in the National Assembly to a five-year mandate and are accountable to the Assembly. During their time in office, the president must forfeit any additional posts in politics or business.

== Qualification ==
A candidate must be a Surinamese national (resident in the country for at least six years) who is at least 30 years of age. A candidate must win at least two-thirds of the votes in the Assembly to be elected. If no candidate wins two-thirds after three rounds, the vote then goes to the United People's Congress, composed of the Assembly and local government officials. In this case, a simple majority is required.

== Powers and duties ==
The president is vested with extensive functional powers. The president names and dismisses ministers, signs bills, and names and dismisses diplomatic staff. She declares war and states of emergency with the ratification of the National Assembly. She concludes foreign treaties and agreements, again with the assent of the Assembly. She also exercises ceremonial duties such as conferring awards, receiving foreign diplomats, and granting pardons.

== List of presidents ==
Political parties

National Party of Suriname (NPS)
Nationalist Republican Party (PNR)
Progressive Reform Party (VHP)
National Democratic Party (NDP)
Independent

No.	Portrait	Name (Birth–Death)	Term of office			Political party	Elected	Cabinet(s)	Vice president(s)	Ref.
No.	Portrait	Name (Birth–Death)	Took office	Left office	Time in office	Political party	Elected	Cabinet(s)	Vice president(s)	Ref.
1		Johan Ferrier (1910–2010)	25 November 1975	13 August 1980 (Note: Forced to resign by Dési Bouterse in the aftermath of the Sergeants' Coup.)	4 years, 262 days	NPS	—	—N/a	Position not established	
2		Henk Chin A Sen (1934–1999)	15 August 1980	4 February 1982 (Note: Dismissed by Dési Bouterse.)	1 year, 173 days	PNR	—	—N/a	Position not established	
3		Fred Ramdat Misier (1926–2004)	8 February 1982	25 January 1988	5 years, 351 days	Independent	—	—N/a	Position not established	
4		Ramsewak Shankar (born 1937)	25 January 1988	24 December 1990 (Note: Deposed in the Telephone Coup.)	2 years, 333 days	VHP	—	Shankar	Henck Arron (NPS)	
–		Ivan Graanoogst (born c. 1942) acting	24 December 1990	29 December 1990	5 days	NDP	—	—	—	
5		Johan Kraag (1913–1996)	29 December 1990	16 September 1991	261 days	NPS	—	Kraag	Jules Wijdenbosch (NDP)	
6		Ronald Venetiaan (1936–2025)	16 September 1991	15 September 1996	4 years, 365 days	NPS	1991	Venetiaan I	Jules Ajodhia (VHP)	
7		Jules Wijdenbosch (1941–2025)	15 September 1996	12 August 2000	3 years, 332 days	NDP	1996	Wijdenbosch II	Pretaap Radhakishun (BVD)	
(6)		Ronald Venetiaan (1936–2025)	12 August 2000	12 August 2010	10 years	NPS	2000	Venetiaan II	Jules Ajodhia (VHP)	
(6)		Ronald Venetiaan (1936–2025)	12 August 2000	12 August 2010	10 years	NPS	2005	Venetiaan III	Ramdien Sardjoe (VHP)	
8		Dési Bouterse (1945–2024)	12 August 2010	16 July 2020	9 years, 339 days	NDP	2010	Bouterse I	Robert Ameerali (ABOP)	
8		Dési Bouterse (1945–2024)	12 August 2010	16 July 2020	9 years, 339 days	NDP	2015	Bouterse II	Ashwin Adhin (NDP)	
9		Chan Santokhi (1959–2026)	16 July 2020	16 July 2025	5 years	VHP	2020	Santokhi	Ronnie Brunswijk (ABOP)	
10		Jennifer Geerlings-Simons (born 1953)	16 July 2025	Incumbent	1 year, 91 days (as of 15 October 2026)	NDP	2025	Geerlings-Simons	Gregory Rusland (NPS)	

== Timeline ==
This is a graphical lifespan timeline of the presidents of Suriname. They are listed in order of first assuming office.

The following chart lists presidents by lifespan (living presidents on the green line), with the years outside of their tenure in beige. Presidents with an unknown birth date or death date are shown with only their tenure or their earlier or later life.

The following chart shows presidents by their age (living presidents in green), with the years of their tenure in blue. Presidents with an unknown birth or death date are excluded. The vertical black line at 30 years indicates the minimum age to be president.

== See also ==
- Politics of Suriname
- First Lady of Suriname
- List of colonial governors of Suriname
- Vice President of Suriname
- List of prime ministers of Suriname
- List of deputy prime ministers of Suriname
