= Santokhi cabinet =

Cabinet of Chan Santokhi Santokhi Cabinet
- Cabinet of Suriname
- 2020–2025
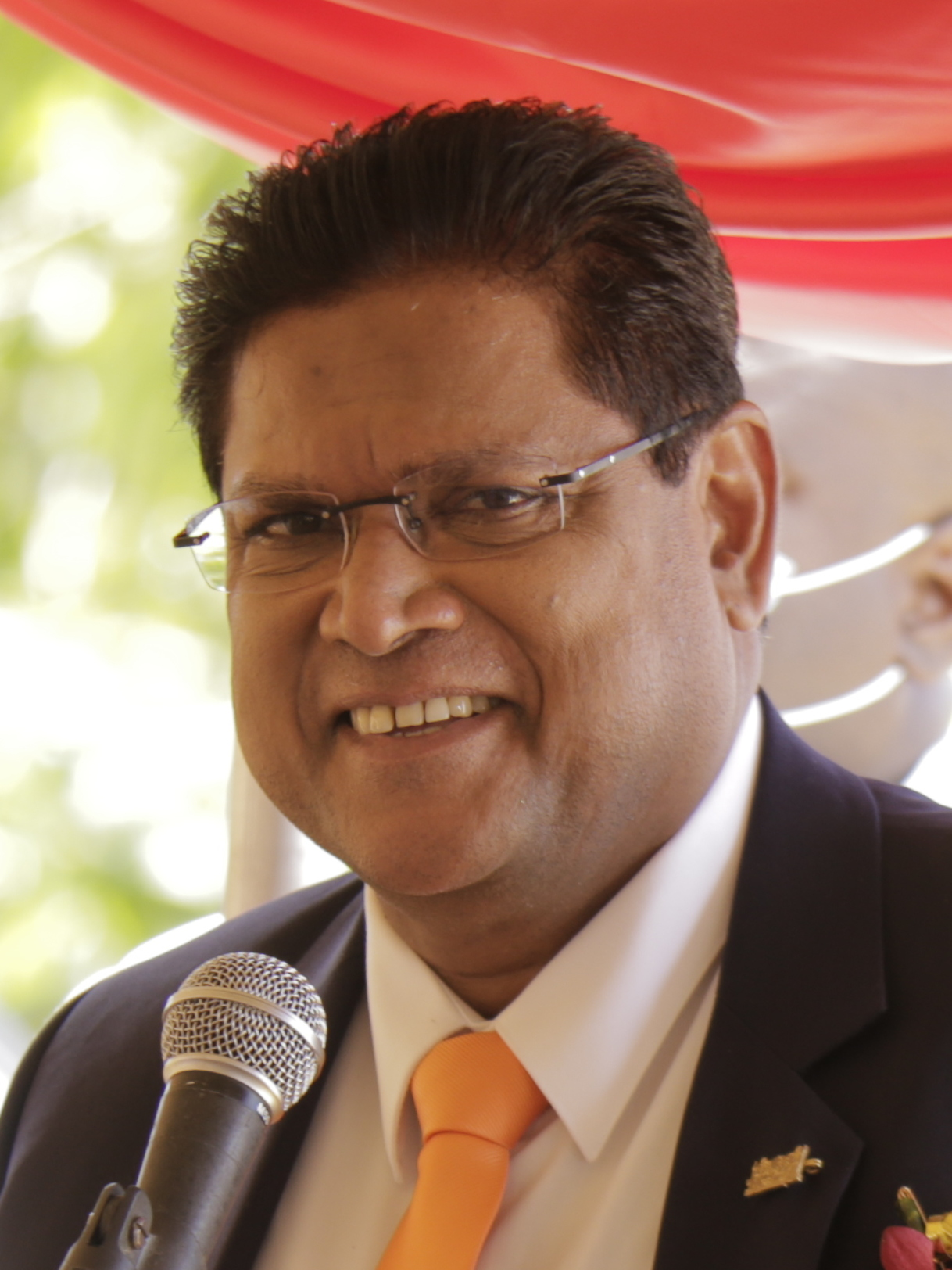
- Santokhi in 2020
- Date formed: 16 July 2020
- Date dissolved: 16 July 2025

People and organisations
- President: Chan Santokhi
- Vice President: Ronnie Brunswijk
- No. of ministers: 17
- Member parties: Progressive Reform Party; General Liberation and Development Party; National Party of Suriname; Pertjajah Luhur
- Status in legislature: Majority government
- Opposition parties: National Democratic Party; Brotherhood and Unity in Politics

History
- Election: 2020 general election
- Legislature term: 2020-2025
- Predecessor: Bouterse cabinet
- Successor: Geerlings-Simons cabinet

The Santokhi cabinet governed Suriname from 2020 to 2025. It was formed by President Chan Santokhi after the 2020 Surinamese general election.

In February 2023 Gregory Rusland and the National Party of Suriname left the cabinet.

== Members ==
Office	Name	Party	From	Until
President	Chan Santokhi	VHP	16 July 2020	16 July 2025
Vice President	Ronnie Brunswijk	ABOP	16 July 2020	16 July 2025
Minister of Agriculture, Animal Husbandry & Fisheries	Prahlad Sewdien	VHP	16 July 2020	16 July 2025
Minister of Defense	Krishna Mathoera	VHP	16 July 2020	16 July 2025
Minister of Economic Affairs, Entrepreneurship, and Technologyc Innovation	Rishma Kuldipsingh	VHP	19 April 2022	16 July 2025
Minister of Education, Science & Culture	Marie Levens	NPS	16 July 2020	16 July 2025
Minister of Labour, Employment, and Youth Affairs	Steven Mac Andrew	VHP	19 April 2022	16 July 2025
Minister of Finance and Planning	Armand Achaibersing	VHP	16 July 2020	16 July 2025
Minister of Foreign Affairs, International Trade and International Cooperation	Albert Ramdin	VHP	16 July 2020	16 July 2025
Minister of Internal Affairs	Bronto Somohardjo	PL	16 July 2020	16 July 2025
Minister of Justice and Police	Kenneth Amoksi	ABOP	16 July 2020	16 July 2025
Minister of Land and Forest Management	Dinotha Vorswijk	ABOP	3 August 2021	16 July 2025
Minister of Natural Resources	David Abiamofo	ABOP	16 July 2020	16 July 2025
Minister of Regional Development and Sport	Gracia Emanuël	ABOP	16 July 2020	16 July 2025
Minister of Public Health	Amar Ramadhin	VHP	16 July 2020	16 July 2025
Minister of Public Works	Riad Nurmohamed	VHP	16 July 2020	16 July 2025
Minister of Spatial Planning and Environment	Silvano Tjong-Ahin	NPS	16 July 2020	16 July 2025
Minister of Transport, Communication & Tourism	Albert Jubithana	ABOP	16 July 2020	16 July 2025
Minister of Welfare and Housing	Hanafi Ramsaran	PL	16 July 2020	16 July 2025
