= List of ambassadors of Suriname to China =

Coordinates: 39.909480°N 116.437962°E

Ambassador of Suriname to the People's Republic of China
- De Surinaamse ambassadeur in Peking
- Incumbent; Lloyd Lucien Pinas since August 16, 2011
- Inaugural holder: Hendrik Fans Herrenberg
- Formation: February 24, 1998

The Surinamese ambassador in Beijing is the official representative of the Government in Paramaribo to the Government of the People's Republic of China. He is coacredited in Hanoi.

== List of representatives ==
Diplomatic agrément/Diplomatic accreditation	ambassador	Observations	President of Suriname	Premier of the People's Republic of China	Term end
May 28, 1976		The governments in Paramaribo and Beijing established diplomatic relations.	Johan Ferrier	Hua Guofeng	
February 24, 1998	Hendrik Frans Herrenberg	De eerste ambassadeur was Herrenberg.	Jules Albert Wijdenbosch	Zhu Rongji	2001
January 11, 2002	Roy Marinus Wong Lun Hing		Ronald Venetiaan	Zhu Rongji	2006
March 2007	Mohamed Isaak Soerokarso	At Stichting Volkshuisvesting Suriname (SVS) Edwin Wolf was succeeded by Izaak Soerokarso who is also from the Pertjajah Luhur.	Ronald Venetiaan	Wen Jiabao	
August 16, 2011	Lloyd Lucien Pinas	on March 6, 2014 coacredited in Hanoi	Dési Bouterse	Wen Jiabao	
