= List of wars involving Suriname =

This is a list of wars and conflicts involving Dutch Guiana and later Suriname from the Dutch colonisation of the Guianas to the present day.

Conflict	Combatant 1	Combatant 2	Results
Invasion of Surinam (1804)	Batavian Republic	United Kingdom	British victory
1980 Surinamese coup d'état	Henck Arron	Desi Bouterse	Military period: Overthrow of the Prime Minister with a violent coup.
Suriname Guerrilla War (1986–1992)	Suriname	Jungle Commando; Tucayana Amazonas	State victory: Rebellion suppressed.
Surinamese coup d'état (1990)	Ramsewak Shankar	Ivan Graanoogst	Coup succeeds: Overthrow of the President with a bloodless coup.
