= Walden (name) =

Walden is a surname and given name.

== People ==
=== Surname ===
- A. T. Walden (1885–1965), black American lawyer
- Aaron Walden (1835–1912), Polish Jewish Talmudist, editor, and author
- Brothers Alan (b. 1943) and Phil Walden (1940–2006), American music producers and managers, founders of Capricorn Records
- Alexander Walden (d. 1401), English MP
- Arthur Treadwell Walden (1871–1947), American polar adventurer and dog driver
- Ashley Walden (b. 1981 as Ashley Hayden), American luger
- Ben Walden (b. 1969), English actor
- Bengt Walden (b. 1973), Swedish-American luger
- Brian Walden (1932–2019), British journalist and broadcaster
- Bruno Walden (1911–1946), German Waffen-SS officer
- Celia Walden (b. 1975), British journalist, novelist and critic
- Chris Walden (b. 1966), German composer, arranger and conductor living in the U.S.
- Christian de Walden (b. 1946), record producer, composer, arranger and songwriter of Italian origin
- Corey Walden (born 1992), American professional basketball player, 2019 Israeli Basketball Premier League MVP
- Ebenezer Walden (1777–1857), American politician—Buffalo, New York
- Edwin Walden (1818–1889), American politician in Massachusetts
- Erik Walden (b. 1985), American football linebacker
- Frederick (Fanny) Walden (1888–1949) an English footballer, cricketer and cricket Test Match umpire
- Fred Walden (1890–1955), American baseball catcher
- Garth Walden (b. 1981), Australian race driver
- George Walden (b. 1939), British diplomat and politician
- Greg Walden (b. 1957), a United States politician
- Harold Walden (1887–1955), English Olympic amateur football player
- Harry Walden (1940–2018), English professional footballer
- Harvey Walden IV (b. 1966), United States Marine, drill instructor and television celebrity
- Herwarth Walden (1878–1941), a German art critic
- Hiram Walden (1800–1880), American politician, United States Representative from New York
- James "Jim" Walden (b. 1966), American lawyer and former federal prosecutor
- Jim "Jimmy" Walden (b. 1938), American football player and coach
- John Walden (disambiguation)
- John Morgan Walden (1831–1914), a bishop of the Methodist Episcopal Church
- Jordan Walden (b. 1987), American baseball pitcher
- Lionel Walden (1861–1933), American painter
- Louise Walden (b. 1983), British ice dancer
- Madison Miner Walden (1836–1891), American Civil War officer, teacher, publisher and farmer
- Mal Walden (b. 1945), Australian journalist and television news presenter
- Mark Walden (b. 1972), British writer
- Myron Walden (b. 1973), American jazz saxophonist and bass clarinettist
- Narada Michael Walden (b. 1952), American musician and producer
- Patrick Walden (1978–2025), English rock guitarist
- Paul Walden (1863–1957), a Riga-born German chemist
- Richard Walden (d. 2009), English professional footballer
- Ricky Walden (b. 1982), English snooker professional
- Robert Walden (disambiguation)
- Roger Walden (d. 1406), an English treasurer and church figure
- Ron Walden (1907–1985), Australian rugby union player
- Rudolf Walden (1878–1946), a Finnish independence man, industrialist and a general, Minister of War during World War II
- Saskia Walden (b. 1974), Suriname accountant and politician
- Stefan de Walden (1896–1976), Polish military commander and engineer
- Susan Walden, American actress
- Tsvia Walden (צביה ולדן; b. 1946), Israeli psycholinguist and academic
- William Walden (disambiguation)
- W. Elliott Walden (1963), American horse trainer and racing executive
- Arthur Hay, 9th Marquess of Tweeddale (Viscount Walden, 1824–1878), a Scottish soldier and ornithologist
- Julie Stefanie Walden (1984) American/Irish. Behavior Specialist and Caregiver to APD

=== Given name ===
- Walden L. Ainsworth (1886–1960), admiral of the United States Navy
- Walden Bello (b. 1945), Filipino author, academic and political analyst
- Bobby Darin (b. Walden Robert Cassotto) (1936–1973), American singer, songwriter, multi-instrumentalist and actor
- Walden Erickson (1902–1968), American professional football player
- Walden Martin (1891–1966), American Olympic road racing cyclist
- Walden O'Dell, American financial executive
- Walden Alexis Vargas (b. 1984), Colombian football player

== Fictional characters ==
- Walden Belfiore, character from the HBO series The Sopranos
- Walden Macnair, character from the Harry Potter series
- Walden Schmidt, character in the CBS sitcom Two and a Half Men

== See also ==
- Waldon
