= Santokhi =

Santokhi is an Indian surname. Notable people with the surname include:

- Chan Santokhi (1959–2026), Surinamese politician, President of Suriname (2020–2025)
  - Santokhi cabinet, his cabinet since 2020
- Mellisa Santokhi-Seenacherry (born 1983), Surinamese lawyer, First Lady of Suriname (2020–2025)
