= Ministry of Defence (Suriname) =

- Ministerie van Defensie (Dutch)
- Coat of arms of Suriname

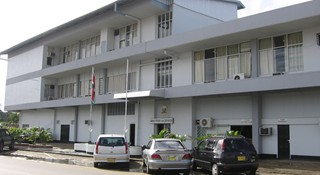

Agency overview
- Formed: June 1988; 38 years ago
- Jurisdiction: Government of Suriname
- Minister responsible: Uraiqit Ramsaran
- Website: Official website

The Ministry of Defence (Dutch: Ministerie van Defensie) is a ministry of the Government of Suriname. This ministry is responsible for military and defense of the country. The ministry in its current form was established on 30 June 1988.

== Ministers responsible for defence ==
- Eddy A. Hoost, 1975–1977, Coordinating Minister of Defense Affairs
- Henck Arron, 1977–1980, Minister of General Affairs
- Michel van Rey, 1980, Minister of the Army and Police
- Edy Ruimveld, 1980, Minister of the Army and Police
- André Haakmat, 1980–1981, Minister of the Army and Police
- Harvey Naarendorp, 1981, Minister of the Army and Police
- Laurens Neede, 1981–1982, Minister of the Army and Police
- Ivan Graanoogst, 1982, Minister of the Army and Police
- Wilfred Maynard, 1983–1987, Minister of the Army and Police
- Willem Sheikkariem, 1987-1990
- Rupert Christopher, 1990-1991
- Siegfried Gilds, 1991-1996
- Ramon Dwarka Panday, 1996-1999
- Errol Snijders, 1999-2000
- Ronald Assen, 2000-2005
- Ivan Fernald, 2005-2010
- Lamuré Latour, 2010-2015
- Ronni Benschop, 2015-2020
- Krishna Mathoera, 2020-2025
- Uraiqit Ramsaran, 2025-Incumbent

== See also ==
- Cabinet of Suriname
- Surinamese Armed Forces
