= Kraag =

Kraag is a surname. Notable people with the surname include:

- Johan Kraag (1913–1996), Surinamese politician
- Kristo Kraag (born 1979), Estonian rally co-driver
- Yannick Kraag (born 2002), Dutch basketball player

== See also ==
- Lygia Kraag-Keteldijk (born 1941), Surinamese politician
