= Harry Kensmil =

7th Deputy Prime Minister of Suriname
- In office 7 April 1987 – 25 January 1988
- Prime Minister: Jules Wijdenbosch
- Preceded by: Jules Wijdenbosch
- Succeeded by: Position abolished

Minister of Natural Resources and Energy
- In office 17 July 1986 – 25 January 1988
- President: Fred Ramdat Misier
- Preceded by: Kenneth Renne Koole
- Succeeded by: Pretaap Radhakishun

Personal details
- Born: Harry Stanley Kensmil; 15 November 1932 Paramaribo, Suriname
- Died: 29 May 2012 (aged 79) Paramaribo, Suriname
- Party: NPS
- Education: International Institute of Social Studies
- Occupation: Politician

Harry Stanley Kensmil (15 November 1932 – 29 May 2012) was a Surinamese civil servant, politician, and radio broadcaster. He served as Deputy Prime Minister of Suriname from 1987 to 1988, and Minister of Natural Resources and Energy from 1986 to 1988. He was part of the Supervisory Board of Staatsolie from 1984 to 1986 and 1988–2009, and was appointed as Secretary of the Board in 1997.

== Early life ==
Kensmil was born in Paramaribo in 1932. He was a teacher, and also worked for several years in radio in Suriname as an editor-newsreader. He then moved to Amsterdam and studied political science, later joining the Netherlands Government Information Service. He earned a Master of Public Administration from the Institute of Social Studies in 1972.

== Career ==
After independence, Kensmil was part of the Committee for Netherlands-Suriname Cooperation. He and other committee members were arrested in the aftermath of the 1980 Sergeants' Coup. Kensmil was in jail for 90 days, sharing a cell with ousted prime minister Henck Arron.

In 1986, Kensmil was one of the NPS members chosen to serve in the transitional cabinet headed by Pretaap Radhakishun; his ministry was Natural Resources and Energy. Kensmil played a key role in managing disruptions to the national energy grid caused by Jungle Commando attacks. He remained in the same ministry during the premiership of Jules Wijdenbosch, also serving as deputy prime minister. In December 1987, he authorized the creation of the Bigi Pan Nature Reserve.

After leaving the Cabinet, Kensmil returned to the Supervisory Board of Staatsolie, periodically serving as an economic advisor to the government. He served on the Supervisory Board of Telesur from 2009 to 2011.

== Cultural Activities ==
Kensmil was a member of the Surinamese branch of the Ancient Order of Foresters, eventually becoming the leader (High Chief Ranger). He was also active in promoting traditional Surinamese cultural practices which had fallen out of fashion, such as the funeral ritual of dede oso.

== Death ==
Kensmil died in Paramaribo on 29 May 2012. His funeral was held on 4 June 2012 in the Grote Stadskerk, and he was then buried in Marius Rust Cemetery.

== Selected publications ==
- Kensmil, Harry. "Na een kwart eeuw omroepwezen in Suriname" (After a quarter-century of broadcasting in Suriname). In: Djogo, 3 (1960), no. 1, September/October, pp. 15–16.
- Kensmil, Harry. "Hoe de Surinamer politiek bewust werd" (How the Surinamese became politically aware). In: De Gids, 133 (1970), no. 9, pp. 328–332.
