= Commander of the Armed Forces (Suriname) =

Head of the armed forces of Suriname

Commander of the Armed Forces of Suriname
- Commandant van de strijdkrachten van Suriname
- Coat of arms of Suriname
- Incumbent; Brigade general Mitchell J. Labadie since 24 April 2026
- National Army
- Type: Chief of staff
- Member of: Security Council
- Appointer: President of Suriname; Jennifer Geerlings-Simons
- Term length: Not fixed
- Inaugural holder: Yngwe Elstak
- Formation: 25 November 1975
- Website: Official website

The Commander of the Armed Forces (Dutch: Commandant van de strijdkrachten) is the professional head of the National Army (Dutch: Nationaal Leger—NL), the military of the Republic of Suriname. The position dates back to the country's independence from the Netherlands in 1975, with the military being named the Surinamese Armed Forces (Dutch: Surinaamse Krijgsmacht—SKM) until after the Sergeants' Coup in 1980.

The Commander of the Armed Forces is appointed by the President of Suriname, who is the commander-in-chief according to the Constitution. (Note: Article 100 of the Constitution of 1987.)

The current Commander of the Armed Forces is Brigade general Werner Kioe A Sen, serving since 27 October 2022.

== List of commanders of the armed forces ==
No.	Portrait	Commander of the Armed Forces	Took office	Left office	Time in office	Defence branch	Ref.
1	Yngwe Elstak	Yngwe Elstak (1927–2010) (Note: Deposed in the Sergeants' Coup.)	25 November 1975	25 February 1980	4 years, 92 days	Surinamese Armed Forces (Surinaamse Krijgsmacht)	–
2	Dési Bouterse	Dési Bouterse (1945–2024)	July 1980	22 December 1990	10 years, 5 months	National Army (Nationaal Leger)	
–	Ivan Graanoogst	Ivan Graanoogst (born c. 1942); Acting (Note: Staged the Telephone Coup.)	22 December 1990	31 December 1990	9 days	National Army (Nationaal Leger)	–
(2)	Dési Bouterse	Dési Bouterse (1945–2024)	31 December 1990	3 December 1992	1 year, 11 months	National Army (Nationaal Leger)	
–	Ivan Graanoogst	Ivan Graanoogst (born c. 1942); Acting	3 December 1992	15 May 1993	163 days	National Army (Nationaal Leger)	–
3	Arthy Gorré [nl]	Arthy Gorré (1950–2018)	15 May 1993	30 June 1995	2 years, 46 days	National Army (Nationaal Leger)	
4	Glenn Sedney	Colonel; Glenn Sedney	30 June 1995	1 July 2001	6 years, 1 day	National Army (Nationaal Leger)	–
5	Ernst Mercuur	Colonel; Ernst Mercuur	1 July 2001	4 February 2010	8 years, 218 days	National Army (Nationaal Leger)	–
6	Hedwig Gilaard	Colonel; Hedwig Gilaard	4 February 2010	10 July 2013	3 years, 156 days	National Army (Nationaal Leger)	
–	Ronni Benschop [nl]	Colonel; Ronni Benschop (born 1955); Acting	10 July 2013	4 February 2014	209 days	National Army (Nationaal Leger)	
7	Ronni Benschop [nl]	Brigadier general Ronni Benschop (born 1955)	4 February 2014	August 2015	1 year, 5 months	National Army (Nationaal Leger)	
–	Adolf Jardim	Colonel; Adolf Jardim; Acting	August 2015	March 2019	3 years, 7 months	National Army (Nationaal Leger)	
8	Robert Kartodikromo	Colonel; Robert Kartodikromo	22 March 2019	3 May 2021	2 years, 42 days	National Army (Nationaal Leger)	
–	Henri van Axeldongen	Colonel; Henri van Axeldongen; Acting	3 May 2021	March 2022	9 months	National Army (Nationaal Leger)	
–	Werner Kioe A Sen	Lieutenant Colonel; Werner Kioe A Sen; Acting	1 April 2022	27 October 2022	209 days	National Army (Nationaal Leger)	
9	Werner Kioe A Sen	Brigade general Werner Kioe A Sen	27 October 2022	24 April 2026	4 years, 23 days	National Army (Nationaal Leger)	
10	Mitchell J. Labadie	Brigade general Mitchell J. Labadie	24 April 2026	Incumbent	186 days	National Army (Nationaal Leger)	

== See also ==
- Suriname National Army
