= Ingrid Bouterse-Waldring =

Surinamese entrepreneur and first lady

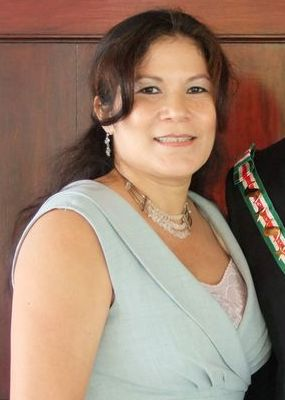
- Bouterse-Waldring in 2010

Member of the National Assembly
- Incumbent
- Assumed office 29 June 2025
- Constituency: Paramaribo District

9th First Lady of Suriname
- In office 12 August 2010 – 16 July 2020
- President: Dési Bouterse
- Preceded by: Liesbeth Venetiaan-Vanenburg
- Succeeded by: Mellisa Santokhi-Seenacherry

Personal details
- Born: Ingrid Yolanda Waldring; 24 April 1961 (age 65) Paramaribo, Suriname
- Party: National Democratic Party
- Spouse: Dési Bouterse (m. 1990; died 2024)
- Children: 1

Ingrid Yolanda Bouterse-Waldring (née Waldring; born 24 April 1961) is a Surinamese entrepreneur and politician who served as the First Lady of Suriname from 2010 to 2020 as the wife of President Dési Bouterse.

== Biography ==
Waldring was born on 24 April 1961 in Paramaribo, Suriname. She graduated from the Secondary Business School in Paramaribo and worked at the Central National Accountancy Service in the 1980s. She has a strong interest in healthy nutrition, healthy lifestyle and natural products. In 1990, she married politician and former military leader Dési Bouterse. The couple had one daughter, and they also raised four foster children.

In 2010, Dési Bouterse became the President of Suriname, making Bouterse-Waldring the First Lady of Suriname. As first lady, Bouterse-Waldring had a ceremonial and supportive role for the president. She was visible in various areas, such as education and youth development, for which she was given the patronage of the Early Childhood Development program in October 2013, a collaboration between the Surinamese government, the Inter-American Development Bank and the Foundation for Human Development.

After Bouterse's presidency ended on June 30, 2020, Bouterse-Waldring was awarded the Grand Ribbon by her husband, the highest distinction in the Honorary Order of the Yellow Star.

Bouterse-Waldring entered politics after her husband, Dési Bouterse, was sentenced to twenty years in prison on appeal in late 2023 and went into hiding. Dési Bouterse died on 23 December 2024. Bouterse-Waldring became vice-chair of the National Democratic Party, but played no significant role. Bouterse-Waldring became lijstduwer for the 2025 Surinamese general election. She was elected via preferential votes and was sworn in as a member of the National Assembly on June 29, 2025.
