= Elstak =

Elstak is a surname. Notable people with the surname include:

- DJ Paul Elstak (born 1966), Dutch gabber and happy hardcore DJ and record producer
- Yngwe Elstak (1927–2010), Surinamese military officer
