= Grondwet =

Grondwet, a word meaning "Constitution" in several West Germanic languages, may refer to:

- Constitution of the Netherlands (Dutch: Grondwet voor der Nederlanden)
- Constitution of Belgium (Dutch: Belgische Grondwet)
- Constitution of South Africa (Afrikaans: Grondwet van Suid-Afrika)
- Constitution of Suriname (Dutch: Grondwet van Suriname)
