= Liesbeth Venetiaan-Vanenburg =

Surinamese social worker and first lady

First Lady of Suriname
- In role 12 August 2000 – 12 August 2010
- President: Ronald Venetiaan
- Preceded by: Vacant
- Succeeded by: Ingrid Bouterse-Waldring
- In role 16 September 1991 – 15 September 1996
- President: Ronald Venetiaan
- Preceded by: Vacant
- Succeeded by: Vacant

Personal details
- Born: Liesbeth Vanenburg; 3 November 1942 (age 83) Suriname
- Party: National Party of Suriname
- Spouse: Ronald Venetiaan (m. 1966; died 2025)
- Children: 4

Liesbeth Venetiaan-Vanenburg (née Vanenburg; born 3 November 1942) is a Surinamese social worker who served as the First Lady of Suriname from 1991 to 1996 and from 2000 to 2010 as the wife of President Ronald Venetiaan.

== Biography ==
Vanenburg was born on November 3, 1942, in Suriname. In 1961, she went to The Hague, Netherlands, to study at the Catholic Social Academy. In 1964, she met Ronald Venetiaan at a student party in Leiden. In 1965, she returned to Suriname for good, and in 1966, she married Venetiaan. They had four children; three daughters and one son.

Venetiaan-Vanenburg worked as a social worker. In 1973, her husband became Minister of Education and Public Development in the Henck Arron cabinet. In 1980, Dési Bouterse staged a coup d'état, and the Venetiaan family had to go into hiding. Later, they were placed under house arrest and reinforced by armed soldiers.

In 1987, democracy in Suriname was restored. In 1991, Ronald Venetiaan was elected President of Suriname, and Venetiaan-Vanenburg became first lady. In 1993, she was chosen Woman of the Year by the Surinamese research agency Foundation for Scientific Information. Her husband was president until 1996. Venetiaan-Vanenburg was again first lady from 2000 to 2010.

In 2010, Bouterse returned to power again. On August 12, 2010 it was decided that Ingrid Bouterse-Waldring, his wife, was entitled to a salary of 8,742 SRD as first lady. It was shown that Venetiaan-Vanenburg had always performed her activities as first lady for free, and was entitled to approximately one million Surinamese dollars. Venetiaan-Vanenburg then turned down the money.

Venetiaan-Vanenburg was also active for various charities, including the extensive Foundation Network Women Suriname and the Netherlands and the Oriole Foundation. In 2020, she was named the best first lady of Suriname by newspaper Dagblad Suriname. On November 1, 2020, her daughter Shanti Venetiaan became the first female chair of the Anton de Kom University of Suriname.
