= Harold Rusland =

Surinamese politician (1938–2023)

Minister of Education
- In office 1980–1983
- Preceded by: Ronald Venetiaan
- Succeeded by: G.B. Sankatsing

Personal details
- Born: Harold Hubert Rusland; 26 June 1938
- Died: 28 January 2023 (aged 84)
- Party: PNR
- Occupation: Teacher

Harold Hubert Rusland (26 June 1938 – 28 January 2023) was a Surinamese politician. A member of the Nationalist Republican Party, he served as Minister of Education from 1980 to 1983.

His son Gregory Rusland is leader of the National Party of Suriname. His other son, Andy Rusland, served as Minister of Finance. Rusland died on 28 January 2023, at the age of 84.
