= Saskia Walden =

Surinamese politician (born 1974)

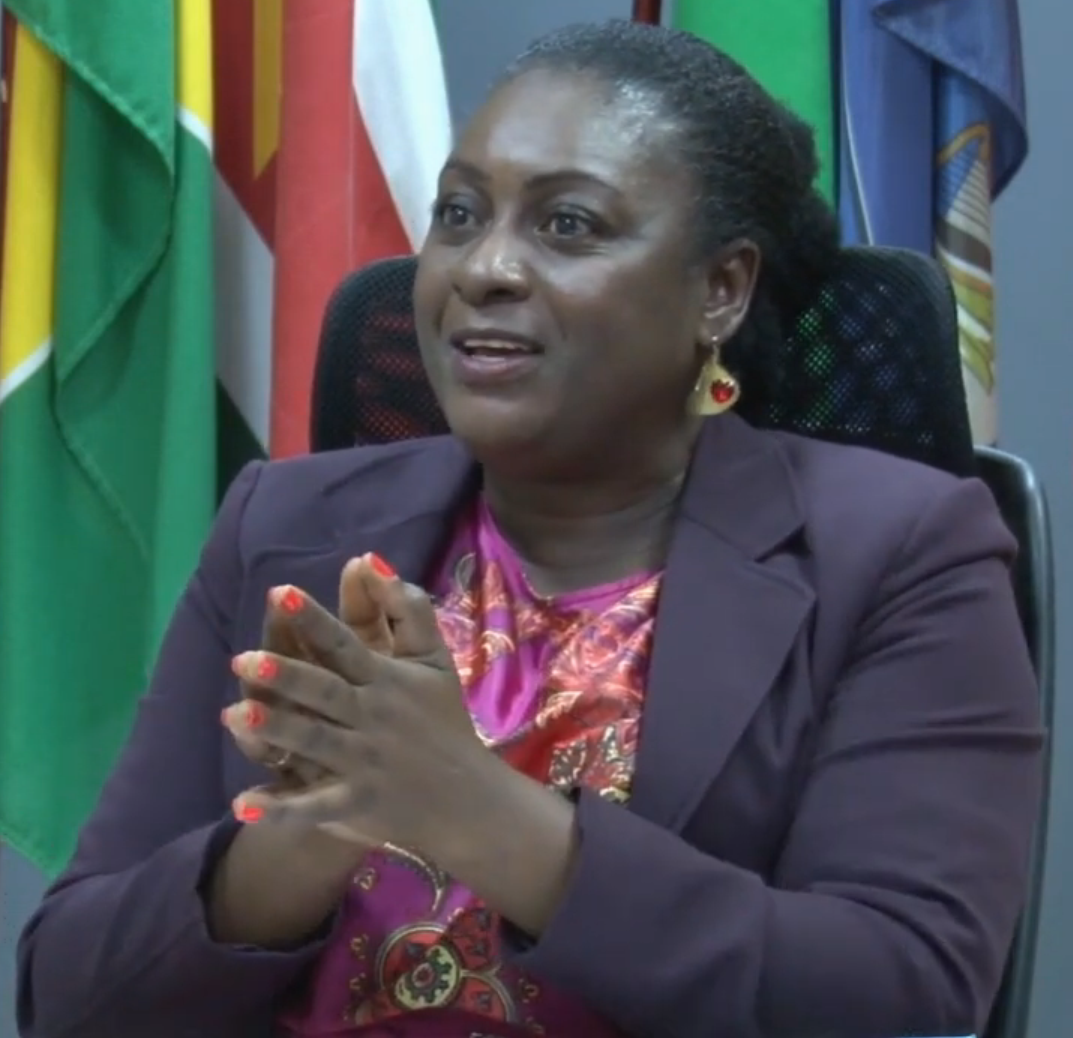
- Walden (2020)

Minister of Economic Affairs
- In office 16 July 2020 – 18 April 2022
- Preceded by: Stephen Tsang
- Succeeded by: Rishma Kuldipsingh

Personal details
- Born: Saskia Natacia Walden; 6 July 1974 (age 51) Suriname
- Party: Progressive Reform Party (VHP)
- Occupation: Accountant, educator

Saskia Natacia Walden (born 6 July 1974) is a Surinamese accountant and educator. She served as Minister of Economic Affairs from 16 July 2020 to 18 April 2022.

== Biography ==
Walden was born on 6 July 1974. In 1999, she obtained her bachelor's degree in accountancy from the Port of Spain campus of the Andrews University. In 2011, she obtained a Master of Business Administration from the University of Texas at Dallas.

Walden started her career as a mathematics and accounting teacher. Later, she became a corporate accountant, and worked for the Surinamese Ministry of Finance and the Ministry of Education. In 2014, she became the Secretary of the Surinamese Checkers Union. In 2020, she was working for the Surinamese insurance company Assuria, and was nominated by the Progressive Reform Party (VHP).

On 16 July 2020, Walden was appointed as Minister of Economic Affairs, Entrepreneurship, and Technological Innovation in the cabinet of Chan Santokhi. In October 2021, it was revealed that she was still the owner of nine corporations and foundations. In her defence, Walden stated that she had performed no activities since her appointment, and that ownership is not forbidden according to the Constitution of Suriname.

Walden resigned as minister on 18 April 2022, but indicated that she would remain available for future service.
