= Dilip Sardjoe =

Surinamese politician (1949–2023)

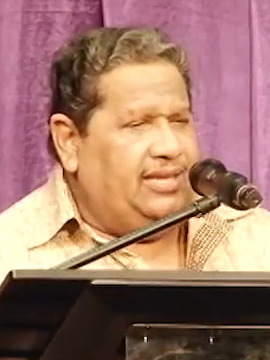
- Sardjoe in 2012
- Born: 11 November 1949
- Died: 15 January 2023 (aged 73); Netherlands
- Occupations: Businessman politician

Dilip Sardjoe (11 November 1949 – 15 January 2023) was a Surinamese businessman and politician. He was CEO and owner of Rudisa Holdingmaatschappij N.V. He was a cofounder and later chairman of the Basic Party for Renewal and Democracy (BVD).

== Biography ==
Sardjoe started his career at a young age shortly after leaving high school. He started as a small trader and founded Rudisa International in 1975. As a salesman, insurance agent and entrepreneur, he had over 17 national and international companies at the age of 25. He imported goods and was representative of several international brands in Suriname. Sardjoe sponsored the Verenigde Hindoestaanse Partij (VHP) for years and was the treasurer. However, he left the party in 1994. Along with several dissidents he founded the Basispartij voor Vernieuwing en Democratie (BVD) and became chairman of the party. The BVD had a good cooperation with the Nationale Democratische Partij (NDP) of ex-dictator Desi Bouterse. He helped the government of his fellow party member Jules Wijdenbosch.

Sardjoe was married, had a daughter and grandson. He was ill and moved to the Netherlands for medical treatment. He died there on 15 January 2023, at the age of 73.
