= Ivan Fernald =

Surinamese politician (born 1955)

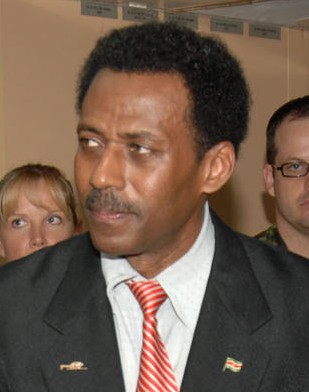
Ivan Fernald visiting the USNS Comfort (T-AH-20) in October 2007

Ivan Christiaan Fernald (born 7 December 1955) is a Surinamese politician, who served as the Minister of Defence between 1 September 2005 and 2010, he was succeeded by Lamuré Latour.

Previously Fernald was director of the Institute for Economic Administrative Secondary Education (IMEAO).

As Defence Minister Fernald sent the military into the interior to assist with flooding in 2006, and was involved with planning a Jungle Warfare School in Suriname for foreign military services.

In June 2012 he contested the leadership elections of the National Party of Suriname, after Ronald Venetiaan stepped down. Party elections were held in eleven districts with Fernald winning four and his competitor Gregory Rusland winning seven.
