= Wasden =

Wasden is a surname. Notable people with the surname include:

- Kevin Wasden, American science fiction and fantasy artist, illustrator, and comics artist
- Lawrence Wasden (born 1957), American lawyer and politician

== See also ==
- Walden (name)
