= Lygia Kraag-Keteldijk =

Surinamese politician

Minister of Foreign Affairs
- In office 2 September 2005 – 12 August 2010
- President: Jaïr Kross
- Preceded by: Marie Levens
- Succeeded by: Winston Lackin

Personal details
- Born: Lygia Louise Irene Keteldijk; 18 July 1941 (age 85) Paramaribo, Suriname
- Party: National Party of Suriname
- Education: University of Utrecht

Lygia Louise Irene Kraag-Keteldijk (born 18 July 1941) is a Surinamese politician who served as Minister of Foreign Affairs in the cabinet of President Venetiaan between 2005 and 2010.

== Biography ==
Keteldijk was born on 18 July 1941 in Paramaribo. In 1959, she graduated high school, and went to the Netherlands to study non-western sociology at the University of Utrecht. Until 1977, she worked at the Nederlands Instituut voor Maatschappelijke Opbouw (NIMO).

In 1977, Kraag-Keteldijk started to work for the Surinamese Ministry of Justice and Police. In 1981, she returned to the Netherlands to work for the Ministry of Social Affairs and Employment. On 30 April 1981, her husband died. In 2000, Kraag-Keteldijk became Director of Political Affairs in the cabinet of President Ronald Venetiaan.

On 2 September 2005, Kraag-Keteldijk was appointed Minister of Foreign Affairs and served until 12 August 2010. On 3 October 2007, she addressed the United Nations General Assembly with regards to Climate change in Suriname.

== Honours ==
- Grand Officer of the Honorary Order of the Yellow Star.
