= 1987 Surinamese constitutional referendum =

| 30 September 1987 |

Results
| Choice | Votes | % |
|---|---|---|
| Yes | 114,719 | 96.94% |
| No | 3,617 | 3.06% |
| Valid votes | 118,336 | 96.73% |
| Invalid or blank votes | 3,999 | 3.27% |
| Total votes | 122,335 | 100.00% |
| Registered voters/turnout | 195,099 | 62.7% |

A constitutional referendum was held in Suriname on 30 September 1987. Voters were asked to approve the country's new constitution. It provided for a 51-seat unicameral National Assembly elected by proportional representation and a President elected by the National Assembly. Over 96% voted in favour, with a turnout of 63%.

== Results ==
| Choice | Votes | % |
|---|---|---|
| For | 114,719 | 96.94 |
| Against | 3,617 | 3.06 |
| Total | 118,336 | 100.00 |
| Valid votes | 118,336 | 96.73 |
| Invalid/blank votes | 3,999 | 3.27 |
| Total votes | 122,335 | 100.00 |
| Registered voters/turnout | 195,099 | 62.70 |
Source: Nohlen
