= Gregory Rusland =

Vice President of Suriname since 2025

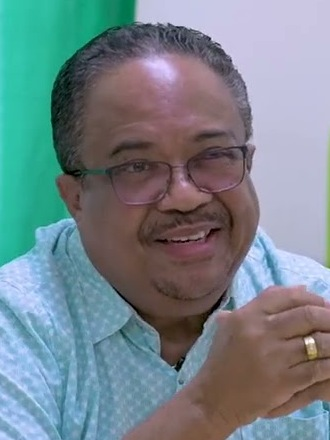
- Rusland in 2025

Vice President of Suriname
- Incumbent
- Assumed office 16 July 2025
- President: Jennifer Geerlings-Simons
- Preceded by: Ronnie Brunswijk

Member of the National Assembly
- Incumbent
- Assumed office 2015
- Constituency: Paramaribo District

Leader of the National Party of Suriname
- Incumbent
- Assumed office June 2012
- Preceded by: Ronald Venetiaan

Minister for Natural Resources
- In office 2005–2010
- President: Ronald Venetiaan

Personal details
- Born: Gregory Allan Rusland; 9 November 1959 (age 66) Paramaribo, Suriname
- Party: National Party of Suriname
- Relations: Harold Rusland (father), Andy Rusland (brother)
- Education: Anton de Kom University of Suriname, University of Florida

Gregory Allan Rusland (born 9 November 1959) is a Surinamese politician who has been the Vice President of Suriname since 16 July 2025. He served as Minister for Natural Resources between 2005 and 2010. In 2012 he became leader of the National Party of Suriname. Rusland has been a member of the National Assembly since 2015.

== Early life and career ==
Rusland was born on 9 November 1959 in Paramaribo. He studied agricultural production at the Anton de Kom University of Suriname and received a bachelor's degree in 1982. He continued his studies in the same field at the University of Florida and obtained an MSc in 1984. Rusland obtained a further PhD at the same institute in 1987. He held several teaching positions at the Anton de Kom University of Suriname between 1987 and 2005. Between 1987 and 2000 Rusland also helped found several institutes at the university. He also went into business and amongst other ventures served as president-commissioner of a shrimp company.

== Political career ==
Rusland served as Minister for Natural Resources between 2005 and 2010. In this period he received criticism for the low taxation rate that Canadian mining company Iamgold had to pay. After the 2010 Surinamese general election Rusland was candidate for the Vice Presidency on behalf of the New Front for Democracy and Development next to presidential candidate Chan Santokhi.

Since June 2012 Rusland is leader of the National Party of Suriname, taking over leadership from Ronald Venetiaan. He won the internal party election against Ivan Fernald, with Rusland winning seven out of eleven districts.

In the 2015 Surinamese general election, Rusland was elected to the National Assembly for the electoral district of Paramaribo. After the elections the National Assembly had to elect the President and Vice President of Suriname. Rusland once again served as candidate for vice president next to Chan Santokhi.

In March 2020, during the COVID-19 pandemic in Suriname, Rusland expressed support for the government measures taken to suppress the pandemic. However, he was critical of the evening curfew, stating that it reminded him of the military government of the 1980s. On 23 April 2020, after the public prosecutor had indicated that it wanted to prosecute Finance Minister Gillmore Hoefdraad for mismanagement at the Central Bank of Suriname, Rusland stated that Hoedraad should immediately offer his position to the President.

On 30 May 2020, five days after the 2020 Surinamese general election was held, and with the official results still pending, Rusland and the leaders of the Progressive Reform Party, General Liberation and Development Party and Pertjajah Luhur signed an agreement to form a coalition government.

Rusland was once again elected to the National Assembly for Paramaribo District in the 2020 elections. On 1 July 2020, Rusland tested COVID-19 positive. He had been tested, because Paul Somohardjo with whom he had lengthy meetings about the new government tested positive. Rusland's wife was infected as well even though she had stayed at home for the last three weeks.

In December 2020 he was re-elected as leader of the National Party of Suriname for a third time.

In February 2023, the NPS under Rusland left the Santokhi cabinet, with the NPS stating that it had been hardly involved in government during the preceding two years. After the 2025 election, Rusland put aside his party's longstanding rivalry with the National Democratic Party and joined an NDP-led supermajority coalition. In return, NDP leader Jennifer Geerlings-Simons named Rusland as her vice presidential running mate. They were elected unopposed on 6 July.

== Personal life ==
Rusland is married and has two children. His father Harold Rusland was a union leader and served as Minister of Education and his brother Andy Rusland served as Minister of Finance. Rusland has stated he is oriented towards the United States and has a special link with Florida.
