= William Walden =

William Walden may refer to:

- W. G. Snuffy Walden (born 1950), American composer and musician
- William Walden (character), a character from the TV series Homeland

== See also ==
- William Walden Rubey, American geologist
