= Ivan Graanoogst =

Surinamese politician

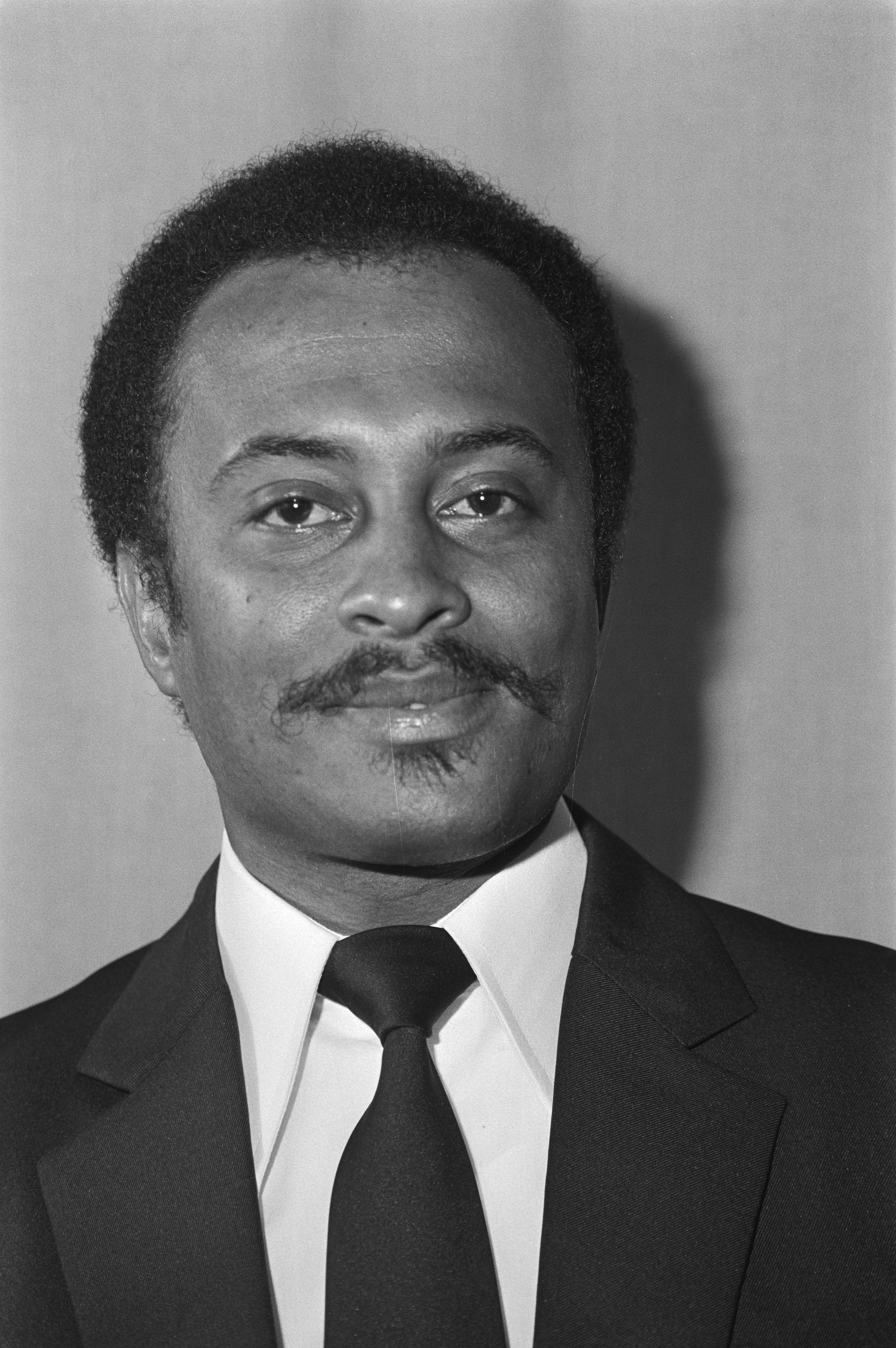
- Ivan Graanoogst in 1981

Acting Military Leader of Suriname
- In office 24 December 1990 – 29 December 1990
- Preceded by: Dési Bouterse
- Succeeded by: Dési Bouterse

Personal details
- Born: Ivan Graanoogst; 29 September 1942 (age 83) Paramaribo, Suriname
- Party: National Democratic Party
- Occupation: Soldier, politician

Ivan Graanoogst (born 29 September 1942) is a Surinamese soldier and politician. He was the acting military ruler of Suriname from 24 December 1990 to 29 December 1990, after a military coup overthrew the democratic government of President Ramsewak Shankar.

== Biography ==
Graanoogst was a lieutenant in Suriname, when the country was under the power of the military regime. At the end of 1980, he succeeded Badrissein Sital as chairman of the National Military Council. In 1982, he became Minister of Culture, Youth, Sport and Information and then Minister of Army and Police.

On December 22, 1990, Dési Bouterse resigned as commander of the army, because of the growing disagreement between him and President Ramsewak Shankar. Bouterse was against Shankar's policy to develop relations with the Dutch government. He also felt that Shankar did not defend him enough, when he was blocked at the Schiphol Airport by the Dutch police as he tried to speak to the present Surinamese people. Graanoogst replaced him as commander of the army. Two days after Bouterse's resignation, Shankar's government was overthrown in a military coup by Graanoogst and Bouterse, known as the Telephone Coup. Graanoogst ruled temporarily for five days, up to 29 December 1990, when the National Military Council decided to hand over power to Johan Kraag.

Afterwards, Graanoogst was the Acting Commander of the Army again from 3 December 1992 to 15 May 1993.

From 1996 to 2000, Graanoogst was director of the cabinet of President Jules Wijdenbosch.

In August 2010, when Desi Bouterse became the President of Suriname, he appointed Graanoogst as Secretary of the cabinet.
