= 1990 Surinamese coup d'état =

Military coup led by Ivan Graanoogst

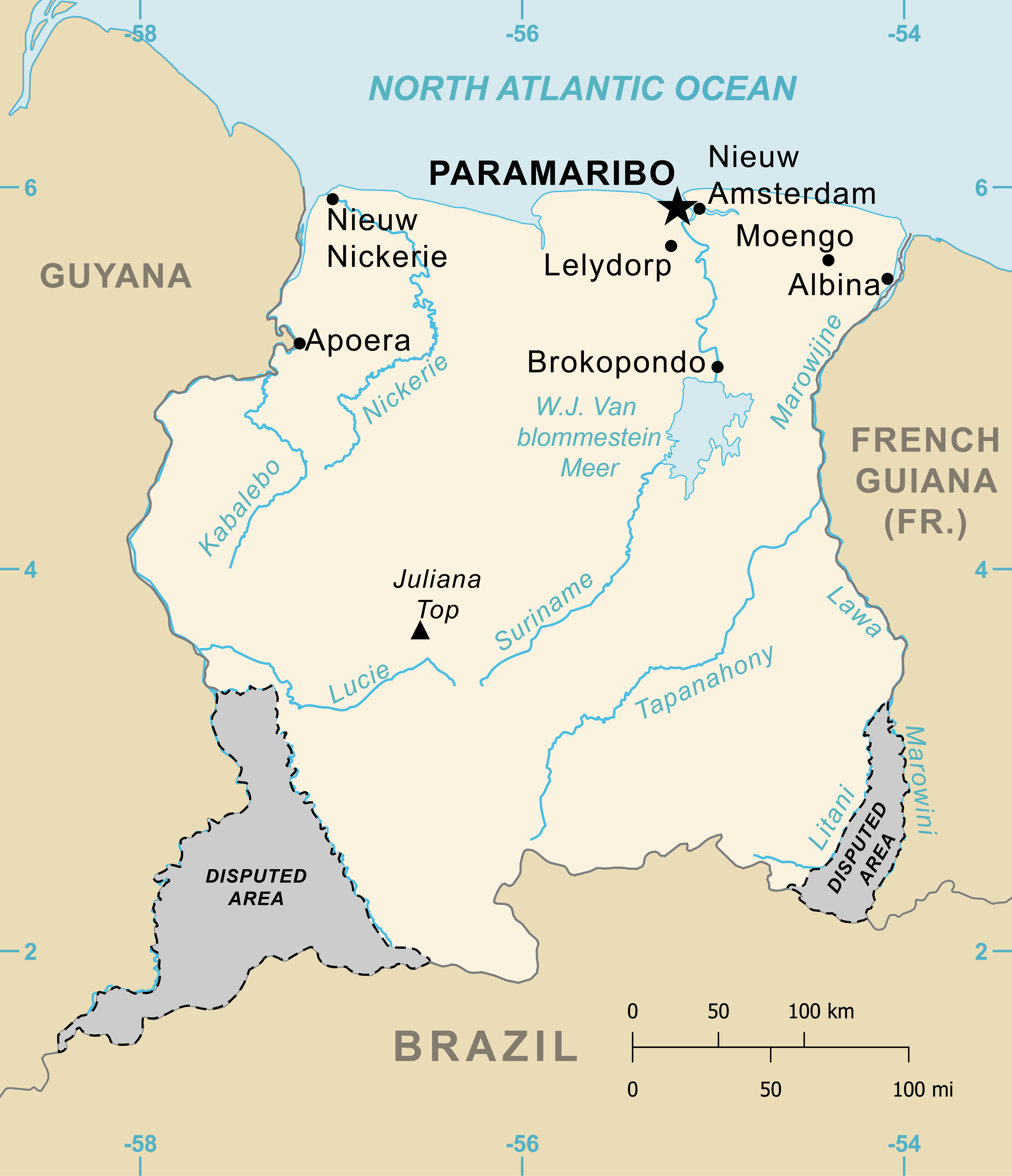
- Map of Suriname.
Date	24 December 1990
Location	Paramaribo, Suriname 5°51′8″N 55°12′14″W
Result	Coup attempt succeeds.: Ramsewak Shankar is overthrown.; Dési Bouterse regained de facto control of the country.

Belligerents
Government of Suriname Supported by: Brazil; United States	Suriname National Army: National Military Council; Supported by: China; Cuba; North Korea; Vietnam; United States (alleged)

Commanders and leaders
Ramsewak Shankar	Ivan Graanoogst
- Nexus of coup in Paramaribo

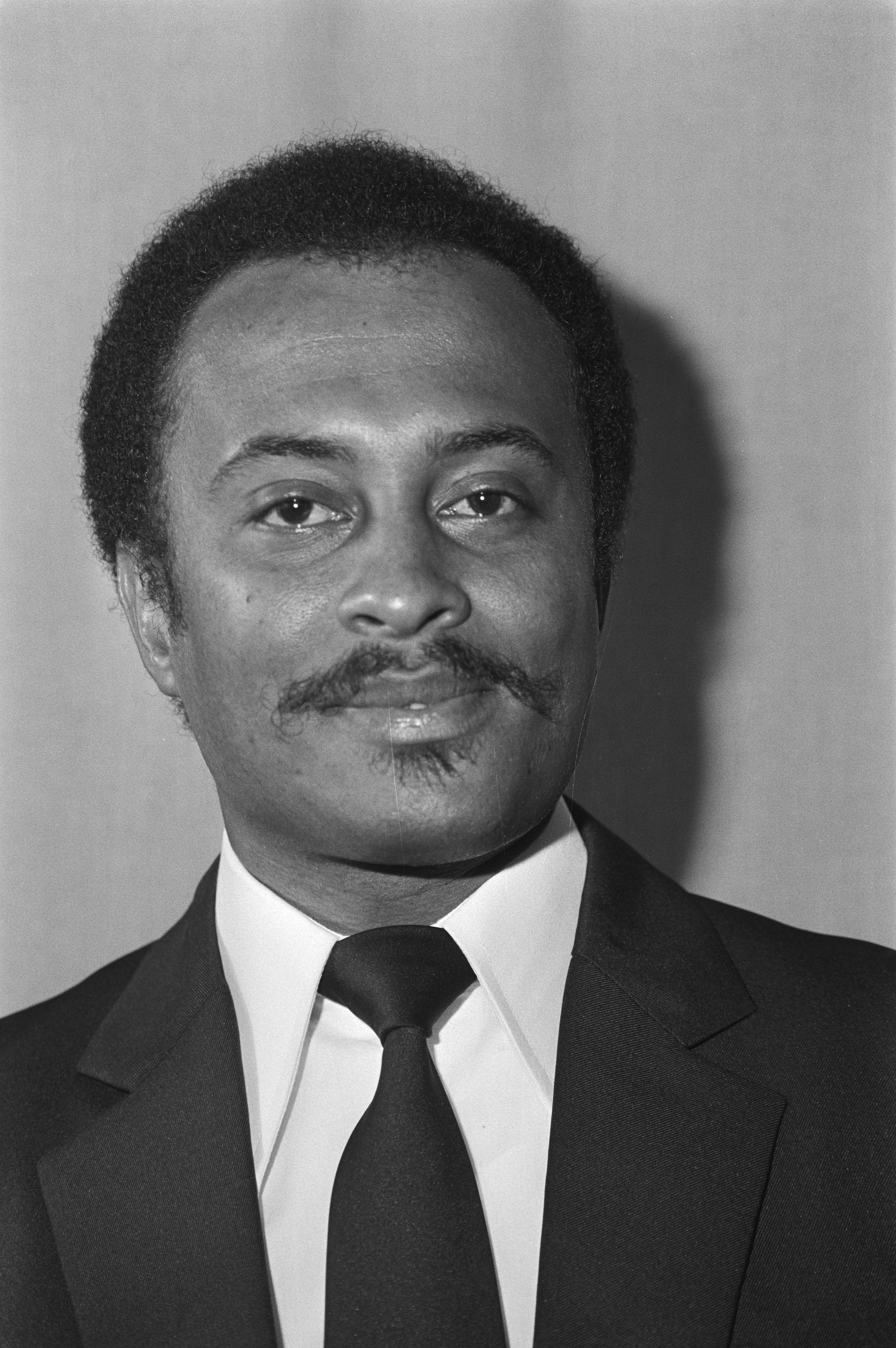
Graanoogst in civilian clothing in 1981.

The 1990 Surinamese coup d'état, usually referred to as the Telephone Coup (Dutch: De Telefooncoup), was a military coup in Suriname on 24 December 1990. The coup was carried out by the acting commander-in-chief of the Suriname National Army (SNL), Police Chief Ivan Graanoogst. As a result of the coup, President Ramsewak Shankar was dismissed from power, and parliament and government were disbanded.

== Background ==
On 25 February 1980, a military coup d'état occurred in Suriname that was organized by Senior Sergeant Dési Bouterse. Bouterse started to rule Suriname like a dictator, heading the National Military Council (promoting himself to Lieutenant Colonel, the highest rank in the SNL). He dissolved the National Assembly, suspended the constitution, imposed a state of emergency in the country, and created a special tribunal that considered the cases of members of the previous government.

In 1987, Bouterse agreed to reinstate the constitution and hold an election if he remained the head of the SNL. However, in the November 1987 general election, his National Democratic Party received only 3 of 51 seats in the National Assembly, and the opposition received 40. The presidential election, held on 25 January 1988, was won by Ramsewak Shankar, who was disliked by the SNL, and Henck Arron, who was overthrown during the 1980 coup, was appointed prime minister. Tension between the government and the SNL was growing.

On 22 December 1990, Bouterse resigned as commander-in-chief and stated that he could not fulfill the role of a clown who "does not have pride and dignity." He was temporarily succeeded by Graanoogst.

== Coup ==
On 24 December 1990, around midnight Suriname Time (UTC−03:00), Graanoogst told President Shankar by telephone that he was being deposed and that he and his government "had better stay home." On 27 December, the government was dismissed, the National Assembly was dissolved, and Johan Kraag was appointed as president on 29 December. On 31 December, Bouterse was reappointed as commander-in-chief of the SNL.

== World reactions ==
The Netherlands reacted negatively to the coup and stopped allocating funds for the development of Suriname. Only after the inauguration of President Ronald Venetiaan in 1991 did relations between Suriname and the Netherlands improve significantly.

Because the international community perceived the coup negatively, the SNL was forced under international pressure to hold the May 1991 general election with the participation of international observers.

== Consequences ==
Less than a year later, Lieutenant Colonel Bouterse again transferred power to the civilian government, which was again led by the opposition. Since then, Suriname has been governed by coalition government. From 1991 to 1996, the president was Ronald Venetiaan, an opponent of Bouterse. During the 2010 presidential election, Bouterse was elected president.

== Bibliography ==
- Bangoer, Aniel P. (1991). De telefooncoup: Grondwet, recht en macht in Suriname [The Telephone Coup: Constitution, Law and Power in Suriname] (in Dutch). Zoetermeer: Bangoer. ISBN 978-9-090-04635-8.
