= Marie Levens =

Suriname diplomat and politician

Maria Elizabeth Levens
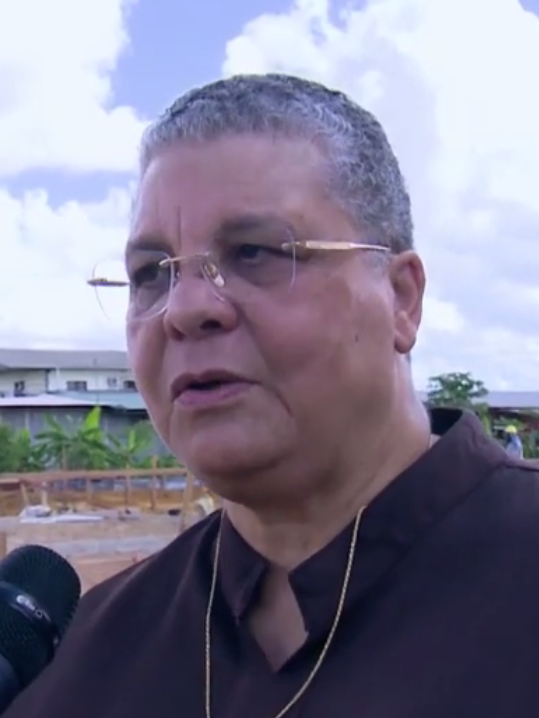

Minister of Education, Science & Culture
- Incumbent
- Assumed office 16 July 2020
- Preceded by: Lilain Ferrier

Minister of Foreign Affairs
- In office 2000–2005
- Preceded by: Errol Snijders
- Succeeded by: Lygia Kraag-Keteldijk

Personal details
- Born: 13 July 1950 (age 75)
- Party: NPS
- Occupation: teacher, diplomat, politician

Maria Elizabeth (Marie) Levens (born 13 July 1950) is a politician who held the post of Foreign Minister of Suriname for five years (2000–2005). On 16 July 2020, Levens became the Minister of Education, Science & Culture.

== Biography ==
Levens first studied at the Pedagogical Institute in Suriname, continued to study at the Vrije Universiteit Amsterdam and received her doctorate from the University of Amsterdam. In 1977, she returned to Suriname to teach at the Pedagogical Institute.

After having worked in education she joined the board of the Anton de Kom University of Suriname and contributed to the establishment of the school of Educational Sciences. The Institute of Quality Assurance at the University was her initiative; she became the first director of that institute and contributed to the national and regional Caribbean movement on the establishment of legislation and mechanisms on accreditation. She was the director of the Scholarship Program in Suriname negotiating with universities in Latin America, the Caribbean and Europe. She became Exec. Director of the Department of Human Development of the Organization of American States (OAS). She had worked at the OAS for 10 years, and started three educational programs.

In 1993 she founded the Progressieve Vrouwen Unie (Progressive Women Union).

In 2000 she became the first woman to be the Minister of Foreign Affairs of Suriname. She served until 2005. Between 2005 and 2015, Levens was the programme manager for the Inter American Development Bank, and negotiator for the border issue with Guyana over the Tigri Area. In 2015, Levens became International Program Manager for the World and Regional Development Banks. In 2018, President Desi Bouterse nominated her for Minister of Education which she refused.

On 16 July 2020, Levens became the Minister of Education, Science & Culture in the cabinet of Santokhi.

== Honours ==
Levens hold an honorary doctorate from the Vrije Universiteit Brussel.
