= Mellisa Santokhi-Seenacherry =

Surinamese lawyer and first lady

- मेलिसा संतोखी-सनिचारी (Sarnami)
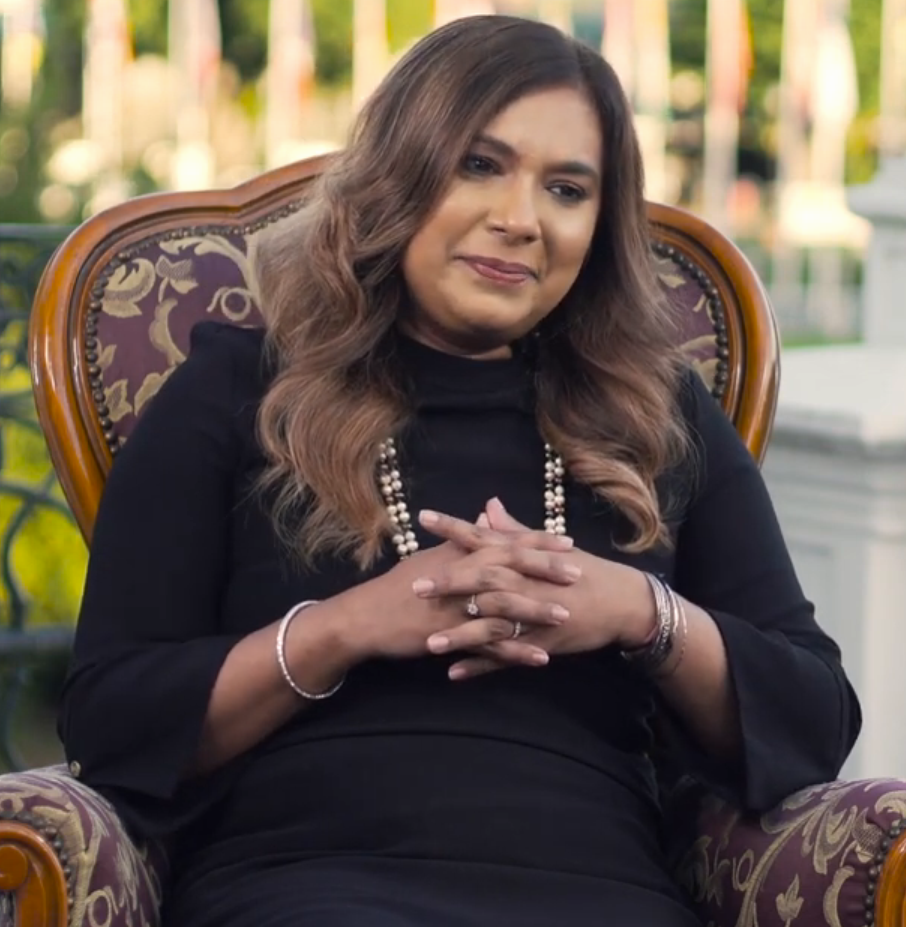
- Santokhi-Seenacherry in 2020

10th First Lady of Suriname
- In role 16 July 2020 – 16 July 2025
- President: Chan Santokhi
- Preceded by: Ingrid Bouterse-Waldring
- Succeeded by: Glenn Geerlings (As First Gentleman)

Personal details
- Born: Mellisa Seenacherry; 27 October 1980 (age 45) Nieuw Nickerie, Suriname
- Party: Progressive Reform Party
- Spouse: Chan Santokhi (m. 2020; died 2026)

Mellisa Santokhi-Seenacherry (Sarnami: मेलिसा संतोखी-सनिचारी, pronounced [meːlisɑː sⁿt̪oːkʰiː sənicɑːriː]; née Seenacherry; born 27 October 1980) is a Surinamese lawyer, who served as the First Lady of Suriname from 2020 to 2025, as the wife of Chan Santokhi.

== Personal life ==
Seenacherry studied at the Vrije Universiteit Amsterdam and the Anton de Kom University of Suriname. Seenacherry became First Lady of Suriname when her long-term partner Chan Santokhi became president on 13 July 2020 after winning the 2020 Surinamese general election.
