= John Walden (disambiguation) =

John Walden was a colonial administrator.

John Walden may also refer to:

- John Butler Walden, Tanzanian general
- John Morgan Walden, American bishop
- John Walden (MP) for Middlesex (UK Parliament constituency)
- John Walden (businessman), Chief Executive of the Home Retail Group since 2014, and former Managing Director of Argos
