= Krishna Mathoera =

Surinamese politician

Her Excellency Krishna Mathoera
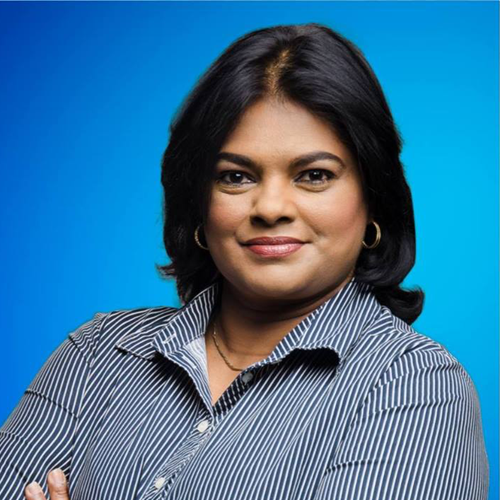

Minister of Foreign Affairs, International Business and International Cooperation
- In office 29 May 2025 – 16 July 2025
- Preceded by: Albert Ramdin
- Succeeded by: Melvin Bouva

Minister of Defence
- In office 16 July 2020 – 16 July 2025
- Preceded by: Ronni Benschop
- Succeeded by: Uraiqit Ramsaran

Member of the National Assembly
- Incumbent
- Assumed office 2015
- Constituency: Paramaribo District

Personal details
- Born: Krishnakoemarie Mathoera; 23 May 1963 (age 63) Wanica, Suriname
- Party: Progressive Reform Party (VHP)
- Occupation: Police chief, politician

Krishnakoemarie "Krishna" Mathoera (Dutch pronunciation: [ˈkriɕnaː(kuˌmaːri) maːˈtuːraː]; born 23 May 1963) is a Surinamese senior policewoman who became a politician in 2015. She is a member of the National Assembly in Suriname for the Progressive Reform Party (VHP). From 16 July 2020 to 16 July 2025, Mathoera was the Minister of Defence.

== Biography ==
She was born in 1963. She began her public service in about 1980 when she joined the Suriname police force and served for 34 years. During that time in she was Suriname's representative with the Inter-American Drug Abuse Control Commission from 2010 for five years. When she left in 2015 she decided to run for parliament.

She is a member of the National Assembly in Suriname for the Progressive Reform Party (VHP).

She believes in law and order and that more of the national budget should be spent on law enforcement. Her own estimate is that the proceeds from illegal drugs is contributing about a billion dollars into the Suriname economy as it estimated that only about 20% of smuggled drugs are intercepted by the police.

She hoped to restore the country's economics noting that between 2010 and 2020 the value of 2000 Suriname dollars in US dollars had fallen from $714 to $142 - lowering the buying power of every citizen. The reduced exchange rate effects the large national debt. The current debt was $5,480.34, but with the reduced exchange rate this translated into a debt, per capita, of SRD 78,120.

In 2011, Mathoera graduated with a master's degree in public administration at the FHR Lim A Po Institute for Social Studies in Paramaribo.

=== 2020 Surinamese general election ===
She was pleased to see the turnout for the 2020 Surinamese general election but although she was there at 6:30 a.m. it was taking hours to process the voters. She was popularly re-elected in the 2020 election when she was the VHP party leader in Paramaribo, and is one of seven elected VHP members of Paramaribo. On 16 July 2020, she became the Minister of Defense in the cabinet of Santokhi. She was still the minister in 2025 when she stood again for election.
