= Yngwe Elstak =

Surinamese military officer

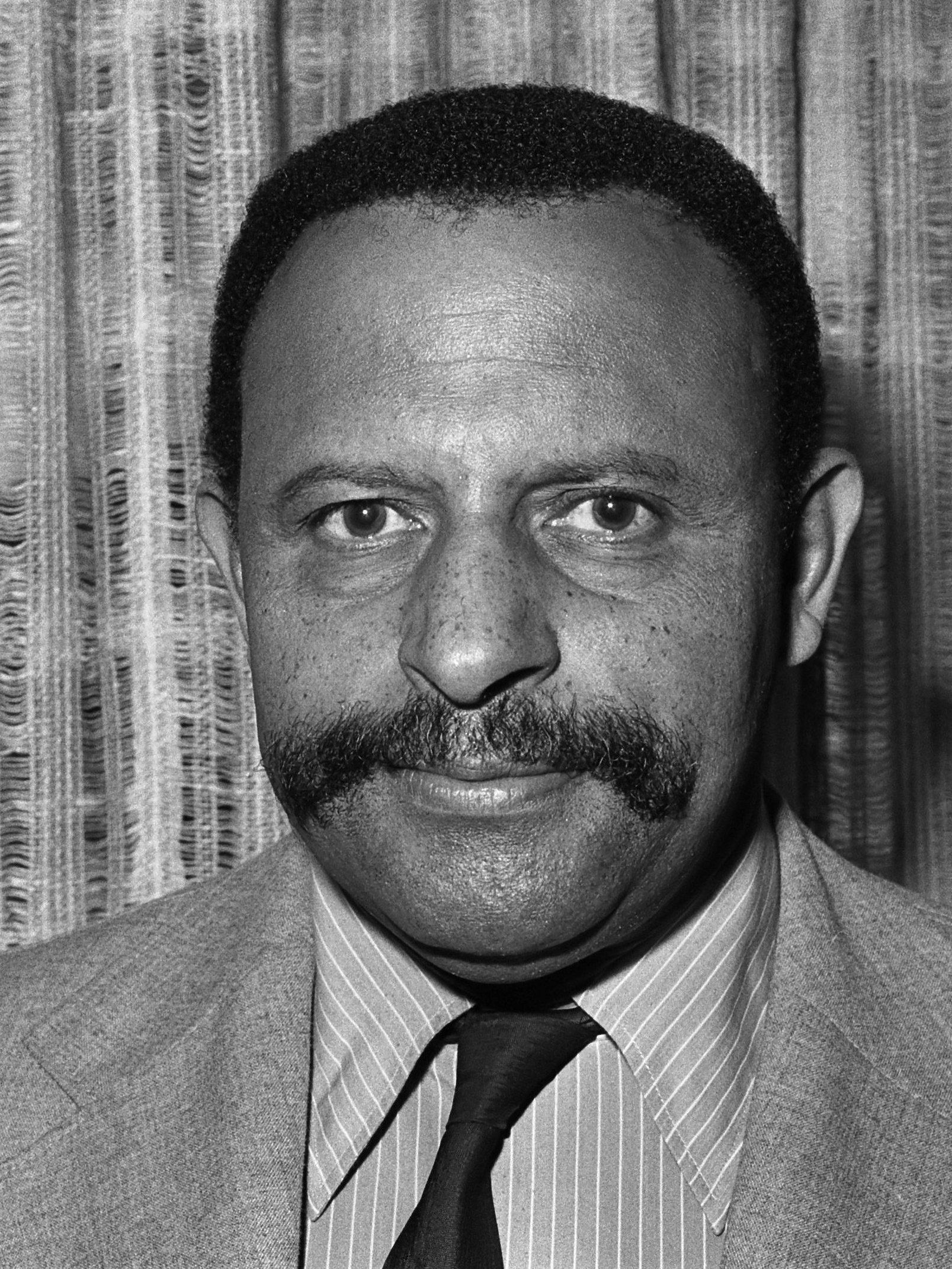
- Yngwe Elstak in 1975
- Born: Yngwe Elstak; 1927; Jayapura, Dutch East Indies
- Died: 2010 (aged 82–83)
- Occupation: Commanding officer

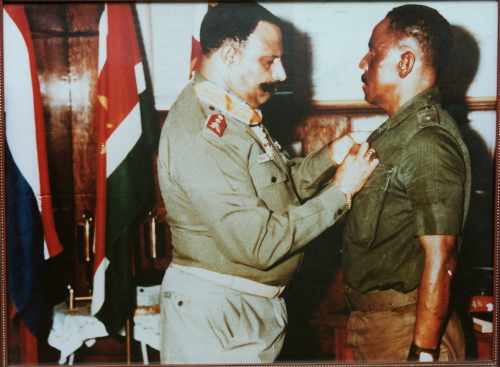
Yngwe Elstak (left) with Fred Ormskerk

Yngwe Elstak (1927–2010) was a Surinamese military officer. He was the first commander of the Surinamese Armed Forces, from November 25, 1975, until February 25, 1980.

== Biography ==
Elstak was born in the Dutch East Indies to Surinamese parents. He left the Dutch East Indies after World War II. As a career soldier in Dutch service, he moved to the Netherlands Armed Forces in Suriname (TRIS), part of the Royal Netherlands Army. In the run-up to the independence of Suriname in 1975, Elstak was appointed as project officer for the transition of the TRIS to the Surinamese Armed Forces. With the independence of Suriname on November 25, 1975, Elstak went into Surinamese service and became the first commander of the Suriname Armed Forces.

In subsequent years, there was much unrest in the Surinamese army, particularly in relation to working conditions. In 1980, non-commissioned officers founded a new Surinamese military union: the BoMiKa (Association of Military Framework). The establishment of the BoMiKa was unacceptable to Elstak and Prime Minister Henck Arron. The three board members were put in prison. As a result, on 25 February 1980, sixteen sergeants led by Dési Bouterse overthrew the Arron government with a violent military coup d'état, now known as the Sergeants Coup. Colonel Elstak was deposed by the coup perpetrators as commander and replaced by Bouterse.
