= Robert Walden (disambiguation) =

Robert Walden (born 1943) is an American actor.

Robert Walden may also refer to:

- Robert Walden (swimmer), Australian Paralympic swimmer
- Robert Walden (MP) for Warwick (UK Parliament constituency)
- Robert Lee Walden (born 1966), American murderer
- R. Wyndham Walden (1844–1905), American horse trainer
- Bobby Walden (1938–2018), American football professional
