= Pretaap Radhakishun =

Surinamese politician (1934–2001)

4th Vice President of Suriname
- In office 15 September 1996 – 12 August 2000
- President: Jules Wijdenbosch
- Preceded by: Jules Ajodhia
- Succeeded by: Jules Ajodhia

Prime Minister of Suriname
- In office 17 July 1986 – 7 April 1987
- President: Fred Ramdat Misier
- Deputy: Jules Wijdenbosch
- Preceded by: Wim Udenhout
- Succeeded by: Jules Wijdenbosch

Personal details
- Born: Pretaapnarian Shawh Radhecheran Radhakishun; 3 September 1934 Paramaribo, Colony of Suriname (present-day Suriname)
- Died: 6 January 2001 (aged 66) Paramaribo, Suriname
- Party: BVD (1996–2001)
- Other political affiliations: VHP (Before 1996)
- Education: Leiden University

Pretaapnarian Shawh Radhecheran Radhakishun (also known as Pretaap Radhakishun; 3 September 1934 – 6 January 2001) was a Surinamese politician. He was Prime Minister of Suriname from July 1986 to April 1987, and Vice President of Suriname from September 1996 to August 2000.

== Early life ==
Radhakishun was born on 3 September 1934 in Paramaribo. In September 1953, he moved to Leiden. Radhakishun earned a cand. in mathematics and physics in 1958, and a doctorandus in chemistry in 1962, both from Leiden University.

== Prime minister ==
Radhakishun was a businessman and vice-president of the Surinamese Business Association (VSB). As a member of the VHP, he was chosen to succeed Wim Udenhout as Prime Minister of Suriname. His power was limited by the influence of the National Military Council of Suriname.

== Vice president ==
During the first term of the New Front government, Radhakishun became a critic of the coalition's power-sharing arrangements. After the elections in 1996, Radhakishun joined a group of VHP members in breaking away from the party leadership and supporting NDP member Jules Wijdenbosch for president. This group then joined the new government as the BVD. Radhakishun served as Vice President from 15 September 1996 to 12 August 2000 in the cabinet of President Jules Wijdenbosch. Radhakishun and Wijdenbosch were defeated in the 2000 general elections by the New Front led by Ronald Venetiaan. Venetiaan accused both Radhakishun and Wijdenbosch of mishandling government funds after the elections.

Radhakishun died on 6 January 2001 in Paramaribo after a prolonged illness.

Political offices
Preceded by Willem Alfred Udenhout	Prime Minister of Suriname; 1986–1987	Succeeded by Jules Wijdenbosch
Preceded by Jules Ajodhia	Vice President of Suriname; 1996–2000	Succeeded by Jules Ajodhia
