= Robert Ameerali =

Surinamese politician (born 1961)

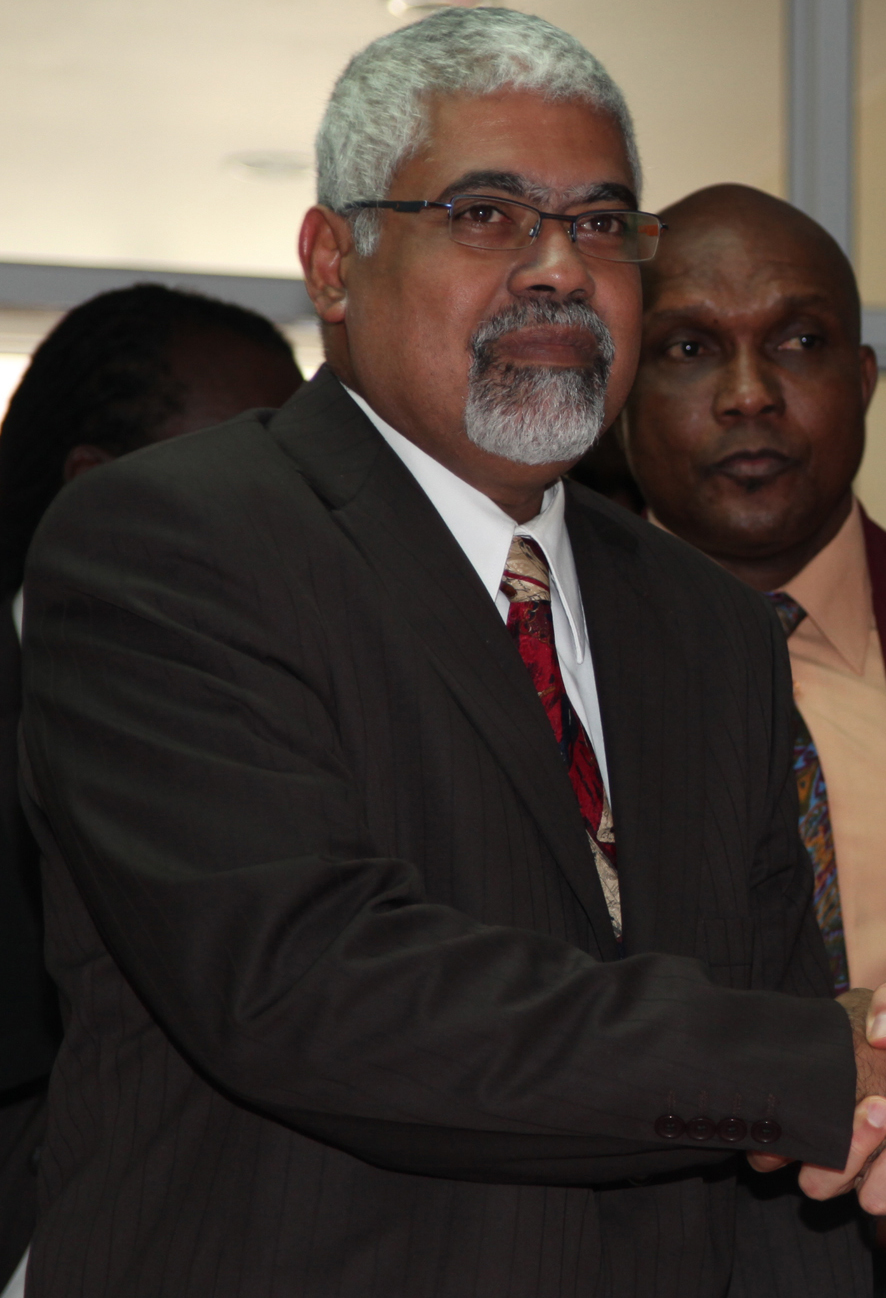

6th Vice President of Suriname
- In office 12 August 2010 – 12 August 2015
- President: Dési Bouterse
- Preceded by: Ramdien Sardjoe
- Succeeded by: Ashwin Adhin

Personal details
- Born: 16 August 1961 (age 64) Paramaribo, Suriname
- Party: General Liberation and Development Party

Robert Ameerali (born 16 August 1961) is a Surinamese politician who was the Vice President of Suriname from 2010 to 2015. Previously he was the chairman of the Chamber of Commerce (Kamer van Koophandel en Fabrieken). He was nominated by the General Liberation and Development Party (Algemene Bevrijdings- en Ontwikkelingspartij, ABOP), which was founded and is still chaired by Ronnie Brunswijk. He was inaugurated as Vice President on 12 August 2010 and left office on 12 August 2015.

Political offices
Preceded by Ram Sardjoe	Vice President of Suriname; 2010–2015	Succeeded by Ashwin Adhin
