= Ram Sardjoe =

Surinamese politician (born 1935)

Ramdien Sardjoe
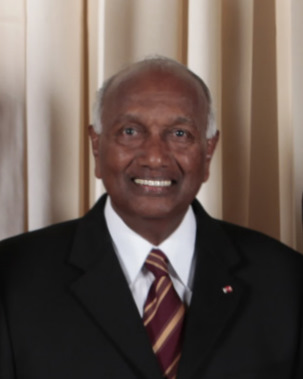

5th Vice President of Suriname
- In office 12 August 2005 – 12 August 2010
- President: Ronald Venetiaan
- Preceded by: Jules Ajodhia
- Succeeded by: Robert Ameerali

Personal details
- Born: 10 October 1935 (age 90) District of Suriname, Surinam
- Party: VHP

Ramdien Sardjoe (born 10 October 1935) is a Surinamese politician and served as Vice President of Suriname from 2005 to 2010. He is a member of the Progressive Reform Party (VHP).

He was born in the District of Suriname.

Before vice presidency, Sardjoe was the Chairman of the National Assembly from 2001 to 2005.

In 2011, Sardjoe retired from politics, and Chan Santokhi was elected new Chairman of the VHP.

== Award ==
Year	Country	Award name	Given by	Field of Merit
2009	Suriname	Pravasi Bharatiya Samman	President of India	Public Service

Political offices
Preceded by Jules Ajodhia	Vice President of Suriname; 2005–2010	Succeeded by Robert Ameerali
Preceded by Jagernath Lachmon	Chairman of the Progressive Reform Party; 2001–2011	Next: Chan Santokhi
Preceded by Jagernath Lachmon	Speaker of the National Assembly of Suriname; 2001–2005	Succeeded by Paul Somohardjo
