= Staatsolie Maatschappij Suriname =

Suriname oil and Gold company

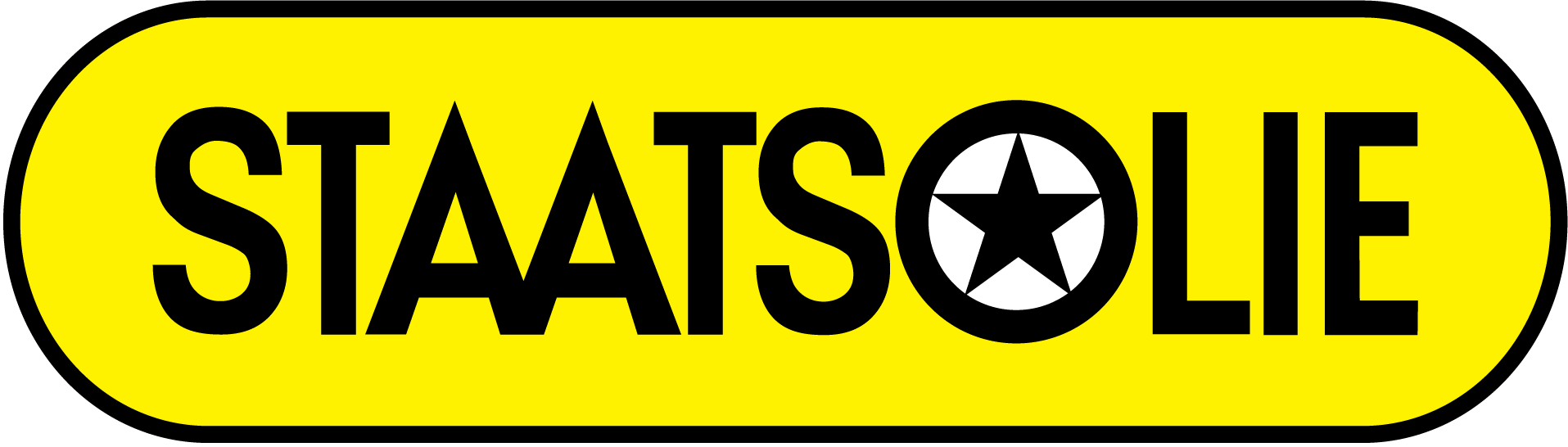

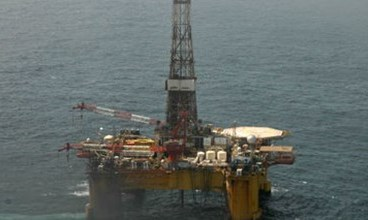
- Type: State-owned enterprise
- Industry: Petroleum, gold mining
- Founded: 13 December 1980
- Headquarters: Paramaribo, Suriname
- Key people: R.T. Elias (CEO) and A.K. Moensi-Sokowikromo (CFO)
- Products: Oil, gold
- Revenue: US$500 million (2019)
- Net income: US$180 million (2019)
- Owner: State of Suriname
- Number of employees: 1,114 (2019-01-01)
- Website: staatsolie.com

Staatsolie, officially Staatsolie Maatschappij Suriname (lit. 'Suriname State Oil Company'), is a Surinamese oil and gold company which was established to execute the oil policy which includes exploration, drilling and processing oil. In 2014 Staatsolie expanded its business to gold. Staatsolie is wholly state-owned.

== Oil extraction history ==
In 1965 oil was discovered in Calcutta, Saramacca. On 13 December 1980, Staatsolie was established to manage Suriname's own oil industry instead of selling the oil fields to multi-nationals cooperations. On 25 November 1982, the first drilling started in Tambaredjo. In 1988 the first crude oil was exported to Trinidad and Tobago. In February 1995 Staatsolie signed a US$36 million loan contract with Dutch bank ABN-AMRO and Swiss bank EFAG to help build a refinery. ABB Lummus Global was commissioned to build the refinery. By 1997 the refinery was officially operational and producing about 8,000 barrels of oil a day. In June of 1998, the Managing Director Eddie Jharap was fired for refusing to sell Staatsolie to Korean conglomerate and automobile manufacturer Daewoo. After a court case, the release of Jharap from the company was ruled unfair and was reversed.

In the 2000s Staatsolie continued to grow by building a 22-kilometre (14 mi) pipeline from Tout Lui Faut to Paranam. In 2004 Staatsolie continued to expand by becoming co-owner of Ventrin Petroleum Company (a marine bunker company based in Trinidad) and two years later the Calcutta, Suriname oil field were put into production. That same year Staatsolie announced their own power company (Staatsolie Power Company Suriname) mainly operating under the electric power sector. Statsolie continued to expand their refineries and improve their oil fields and in 2011 they acquired Chevron operations in Suriname. Throughout the 2010s Statsolie focused on sustainability projects and exploration missions to find more oil reserves.

=== Staatsolie's competition ===
Staatsolie has seen more competition recently as more companies begin to explore the oil opportunities in the Surinamese region. In 2020 ExxonMobil and Petronas (Malaysian owned oil company) found an extensive amount of crude oil in the Guyana-Suriname Basin in Block 52. Both Exxonmobil and Petronas own 50 percent participating interest in Block 52. In 2023, the French Company TotalEnergies announced Suriname's first ever offshore drilling project which is a $9 billion project imposed by the International Monetary Fund (IMF) to ease the extreme poverty in the country which was endorsed by the current CEO of Staatsolie (Annand Jagesar). As Suriname receives growing interest from the world for its oil, Staatsolie has been excited to work together with corporations. In 2022, Chevron and Staatsolie expanded their cooperation by signing a sharing contract for offshore Block 7.

The company has been planning on creating solar projects to help reduce their CO_{2} emissions. In 2023 the CEO said "If we want to survive as a company, we have to transition to providing clean energy." In the year 2021, they contributed $558 million to the state treasury.

== Gold mining history ==
In 2014 it was announced that Staatsolie would participate for 25% in a recently discovered gold field in the Merian area. In 2019 the production was 524,000 ounces of gold, resulting in an annual revenue of US$101 million.

On 27 April 2019, Staatsolie and Rosebel gold mine have come to an agreement for new mines. Staatsolie will participate for 30% in a joint venture with Rosebel.
