= Rishma Kuldipsingh =

Surinamese politician and economist

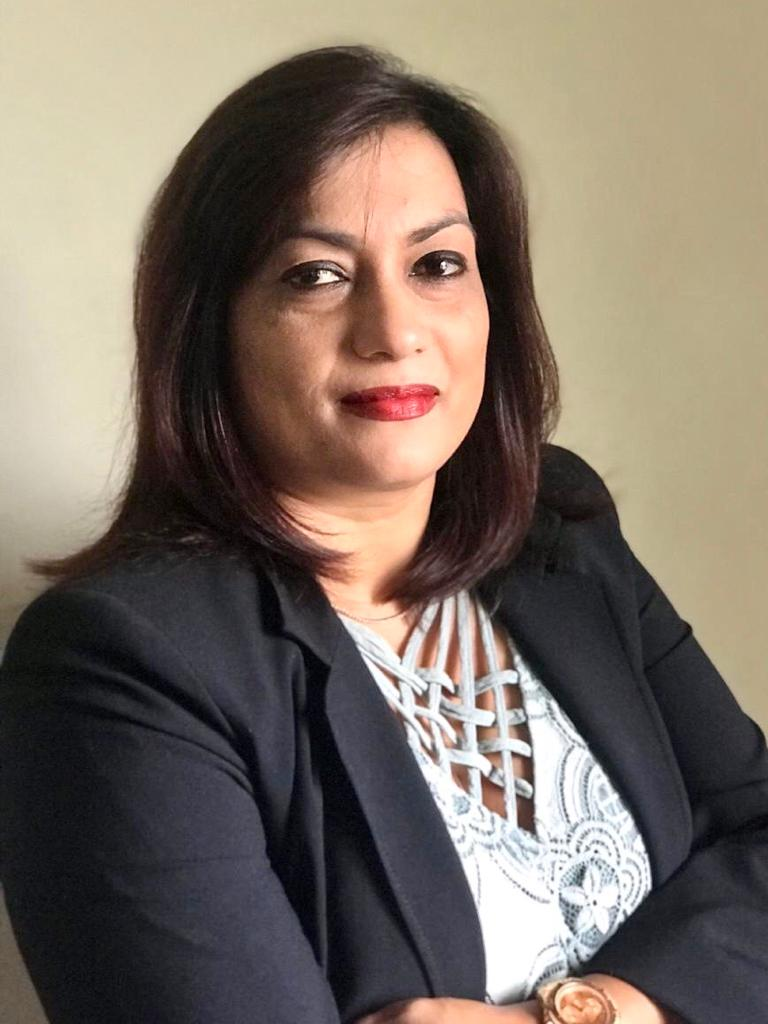
- Kuldipsingh in 2020

Minister of Economic Affairs, Entrepreneurship, and Technological Innovation
- Incumbent
- Assumed office 19 April 2022
- President: Chandrikapersad Santokhi

Minister of Labor, Employment, and Youth Affairs
- In office 16 July 2020 – 19 April 2022
- President: Chandrikapersad Santokhi
- Succeeded by: Steven Mac Andrew

Personal details
- Born: Suriname
- Political party: Progressive Reform Party (VHP)
- Occupation: Politician; Public servant

Rishma Nimi Kuldipsingh is a Surinamese politician and public servant. She is currently serving as the Minister of Economic Affairs, Entrepreneurship, and Technological Innovation in the cabinet of President Chandrikapersad Santokhi, a position she has held since April 19, 2022. Previously, she served as the Minister of Labor, Employment, and Youth Affairs from 2020 to 2022.

== Early life ==
Rishma Kuldipsingh was born in Suriname and has been active in public service since 1997. She pursued higher education at the Netherlands Business Academy, where she earned a Master of Business Administration (MBA) degree between 2013 and 2017.

== Career ==
Kuldipsingh began her career in government working for the Ministry of Education. She was responsible for managing procedures for Surinamese students seeking to study abroad. From 2016 to 2018, she coordinated the Small and Medium Enterprises (SME) Fund and later worked as a senior policy officer and management trainer at the Ministry of Labor.

In 2020, Kuldipsingh ran as a candidate for the Progressive Reform Party (VHP) in the Paramaribo district during the general elections. Although placed in an unelectable position on the party list, she was later appointed as Minister of Labor, Employment, and Youth Affairs in the Santokhi administration. During her tenure, she focused on labor market reforms and youth empowerment initiatives.

In April 2022, Kuldipsingh transitioned to her current role as Minister of Economic Affairs, Entrepreneurship, and Technological Innovation. In this capacity, she has overseen projects aimed at strengthening micro-, small-, and medium-sized enterprises (MSMEs) in Suriname. Notably, she launched initiatives in collaboration with international organizations like the Caribbean Development Bank to enhance export opportunities for local businesses.
