= Jules Ajodhia =

Surinamese politician (1945–2024)

Jules Rattankoemar Ajodhia
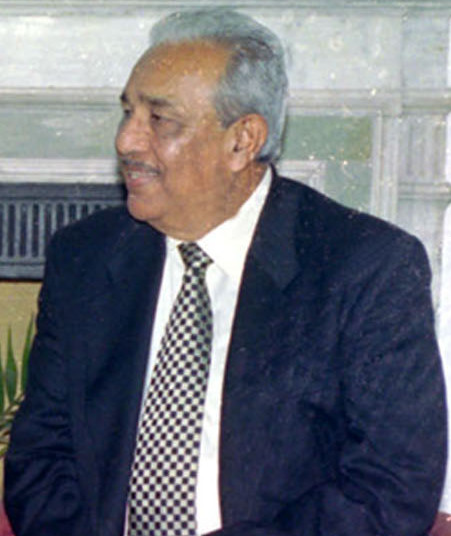
- Ajodhia in 2005

3rd Vice President of Suriname
- In office 12 August 2000 – 12 August 2005
- President: Ronald Venetiaan
- Preceded by: Pretaap Radhakishun
- Succeeded by: Ram Sardjoe
- In office 16 September 1991 – 15 September 1996
- President: Ronald Venetiaan
- Preceded by: Jules Wijdenbosch
- Succeeded by: Pretaap Radhakishun

Personal details
- Born: 27 January 1945 Wanica District, Colony of Suriname
- Died: 29 March 2024 (aged 79) Paramaribo, Suriname
- Party: Progressive Reform Party

Jules Rattankoemar Ajodhia (27 January 1945 – 29 March 2024) was a Surinamese politician. He was a member of the Progressive Reform Party. From 1988 to 1990, he was Minister of Justice and Police. He was also twice vice president of Suriname.

== Life and career ==
Jules Rattankoemar Ajodhia was born in Wanica District on 27 January 1945.

The first term as vice president was from 16 September 1991 to 15 September 1996. The second term started on 12 August 2000 and ended on 12 August 2005.

Ajodhia died at the St. Vincentius Hospital in Paramaribo, on 29 March 2024, at the age of 79.

Political offices
Preceded by Jules Wijdenbosch	Vice President of Suriname; 1991–1996	Succeeded by Pretaap Radhakishun
Preceded by Pretaap Radhakishun	Vice President of Suriname; 2000–2005	Succeeded by Ramdien Sardjoe
