= Basic Party for Renewal and Democracy =

Basic Party for Renewal and Democracy Basispartij voor Vernieuwing en Democratie
- Founders: Dilip Sardjoe & Atta Mungra
- Founded: 14 September 1996
- Dissolved: 10 March 2014
- Split from: VHP
- Merged into: NDP
- Succeeded by: DNL
- Ideology: Social democracy Before 2010: Indo-Surinamese interests

The Basic Party for Renewal and Democracy (Dutch: Basispartij voor Vernieuwing en Democratie) was a political party in Suriname.

== 2005 elections ==
At the legislative elections (25 May 2005), the party was part of the People's Alliance for Progress that won 14.5% of the popular vote and five out of 51 seats in the National Assembly. The BVD itself won one seat.

== 2010 elections ==
The BVD formed a coalition with the Political Wing of the FAL for the 2010 elections (25 May 2010). This coalition received 5.07% of the popular vote, but did not enter the National Assembly.

== Dissolution ==
Party members who opposed the merger decided to continue as "The New Lion" (De Nieuwe Leeuw) party, in reference to the logo of the BVD.

== Electoral results ==
Election	No. of overall seats won	+/–	Government	Notes
1996	5 / 51	▲5	Coalition	Part of the VHP during the election
2000	0 / 51	▼5	Extra-parliamentary	
2005	1 / 51	▲1	Opposition	part of the Volksalliantie Voor Vooruitgang (VVV)
2010	0 / 51	▼1	Extra-parliamentary	

== Timeline of party chairmen ==
- Atta Mungra, 1996-1998
- Tjan Gobardhan, 1998-2007
- Dilip Sardjoe, 2007-2014
