= Johan Kraag =

President of Suriname from 1990 to 1991

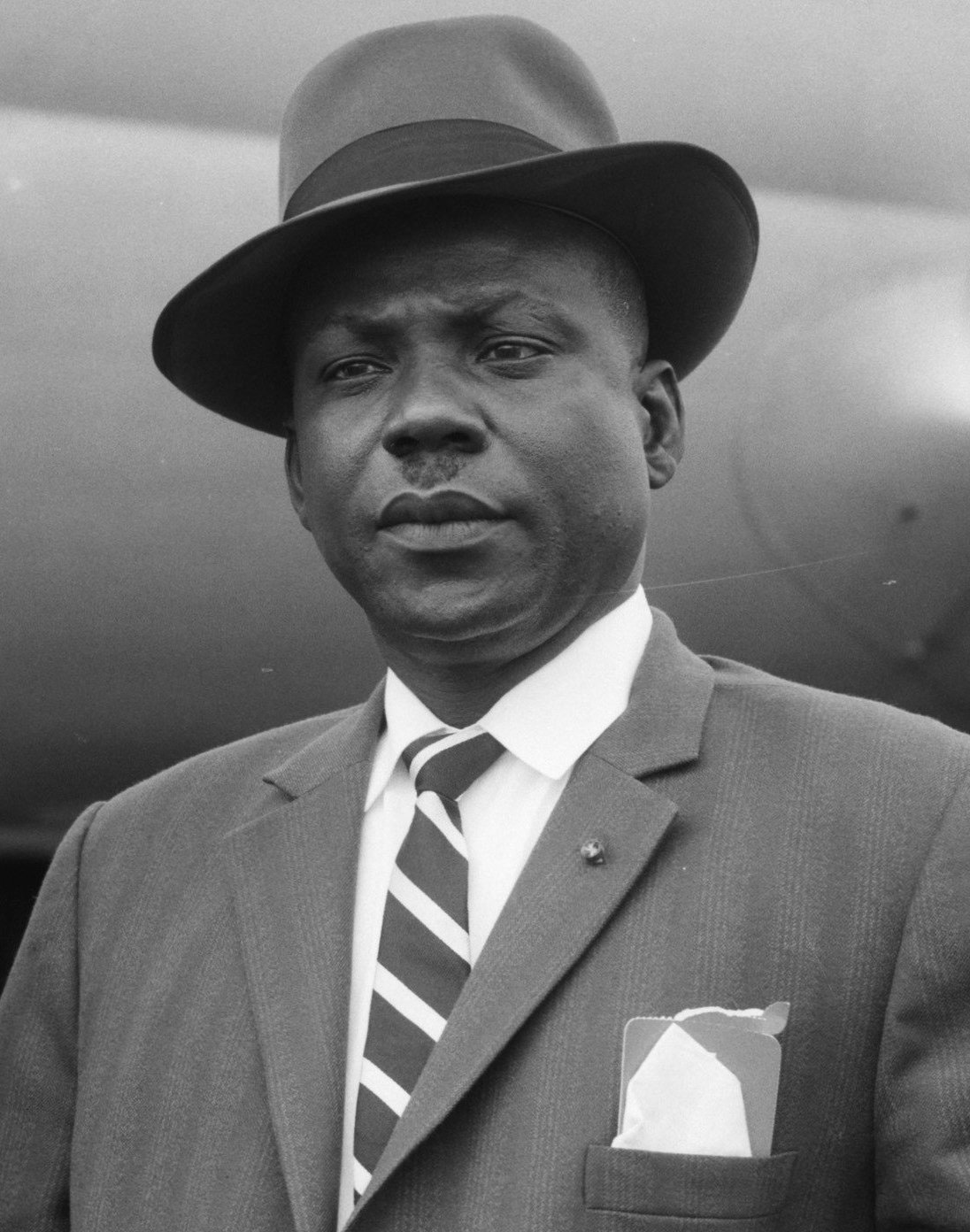

5th President of Suriname
- In office 29 December 1990 – 16 September 1991
- Vice President: Jules Wijdenbosch
- Preceded by: Ramsewak Shankar
- Succeeded by: Ronald Venetiaan

3rd Deputy Prime Minister of Suriname
- In office 15 February 1964 – 5 March 1969
- Prime Minister: Johan Adolf Pengel
- Preceded by: Sewraam Rambaran Mishre
- Succeeded by: Harry Radhakishun

Minister of Social Affairs
- In office 30 June 1963 – 5 March 1969
- Prime Minister: Johan Adolf Pengel
- Preceded by: Emile Ensberg
- Succeeded by: August Biswamitre

Personal details
- Born: Johannes Samuel Petrus Kraag; 29 July 1913 Hamilton, Coronie, Suriname
- Died: 24 May 1996 (aged 82)
- Party: NPS
- Occupation: Politician

Johannes Samuel Petrus "Johan" Kraag (29 July 1913 – 24 May 1996) was a Surinamese politician who served as the President of Suriname from 29 December 1990, until 16 September 1991.

== Political career ==
Kraag was a member of the National Party of Suriname. He served as the Chairman of the Estates of Suriname from 1958 to 1963. In 1963, Kraag joined the Pengel cabinet as Minister of Social Affairs. He was subsequently named Deputy Prime Minister of Suriname as well. He retired from politics after the 1969 Surinamese general election, although he was still widely respected. The Surinamese daily De Vrije Stem suggested Kraag as a candidate for ambassador to the Netherlands in 1974; in 1979, the newspaper Nieuwe Leidsche Courant considered him as a potential successor to President Johan Ferrier.

=== Honorary Chairman ===
After democracy was restored in 1987, Kraag accepted the title of "Honorary Chairman" of the NPS. However, he joined the party's moderate wing, which protested against leader Henck Arron's tight control on internal party decisions.

On 22 December 1990, Bouterse resigned from the Army after a disagreement with President Ramsewak Shankar. On 24 December a military coup known as the "telephone coup" ousted President Shankar, and Ivan Graanoogst was appointed as Acting President.

=== President of Suriname ===
On 29 December, Kraag was chosen by the National Assembly as President of Suriname. Jules Wijdenbosch, a follower of Bouterse, was appointed Vice President. On 30 December, Kraag approved the Army's request to reinstate Bouterse as Commander of the Army, and Bouterse officially returned on 1 January 1991. On 16 September 1991, Kraag was succeeded by Ronald Venetiaan.

Political offices
| Preceded by Ramsewak Shankar | President of Suriname; 1990–1991 | Succeeded by Ronald Venetiaan |
