= Ramsewak Shankar =

President of Suriname from 1988 to 1990

- रामसेवक शंकर
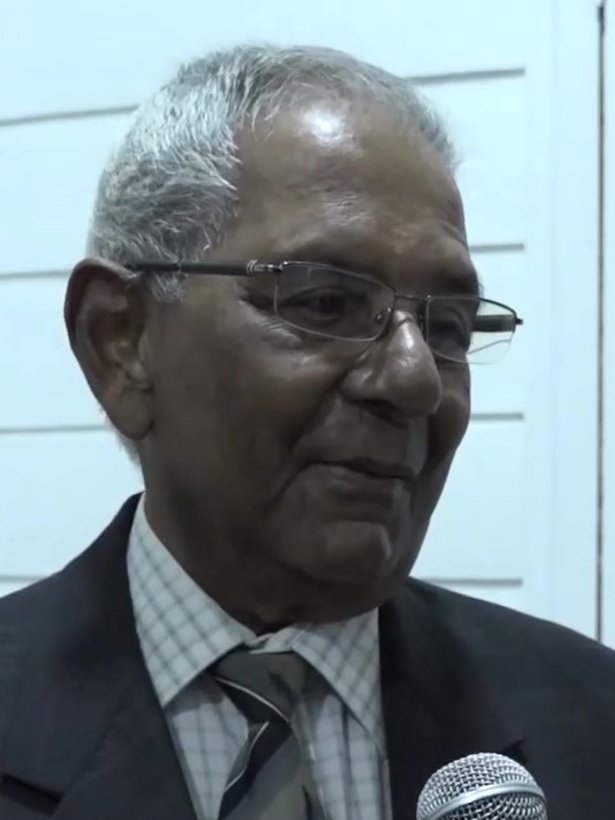
- Shankar in 2023

4th President of Suriname
- In office 25 January 1988 – 24 December 1990
- Vice President: Henck Arron
- Preceded by: L.F. Ramdat Misier
- Succeeded by: Johan Kraag

Personal details
- Born: 6 November 1937 (age 88) Waldeck, Nickerie, Suriname
- Party: VHP

Ramsewak Shankar (born 6 November 1937) is a Surinamese politician who was the 4th President of Suriname, serving from 1988 to 1990. His government was overthrown by Dési Bouterse leading a bloodless military coup. Shankar had previously served as Agriculture & Fisheries Minister from 1969 to 1971.

Shankar is a member of the large ethnic South Asian community in Suriname. He had studied at Wageningen University in the Netherlands. After his return to Suriname, he became active in the Progressive Reform Party. He supported independence in 1975. Upon the death of Chan Santokhi on 30 March 2026, Shankar is the only living former Surinamese president.

== Career ==
Shankar was elected as president by the National Assembly after a parliamentary election was held in November 1987. The ruling military regime had led the National Assembly to adopt a new constitution, which permitted coup leader Dési Bouterse to remain as head of the army. Ramsewak Shankar was a former agriculture minister and succeeded Ramdat Misier as the President of Suriname. The Shankar government initially gained the full support of the National Assembly.

In 1989 the Treaty of Kourou, a ceasefire agreement between the Jungle Commando and the Surinamese army, was signed. Shankar agreed to pardon the Maroons who had been waging the civil war against the military in an effort to preserve their autonomy within their traditional territory in the rain forest. He discussed the possibility of their members keeping their arms in the interior. In April 1989, a general amnesty was passed for violence committed during the civil war, but not for human rights violations which had mainly been committed by the National Army. Dési Bouterse and the National Democratic Party opposed the agreement, calling it a violation of the constitution. Nevertheless, the National Assembly approved the Kourou Agreement with a large majority.

In December 1990 both Bouterse and Shankar were on an international trip, and made a stop over in Amsterdam Airport Schiphol. Bouterse was not allowed to leave the security area by the Dutch military police while Shankar could pass, and received full access to the gathered press. On 21 December, Bouterse attacked Shankar on his return in Suriname for failing to protest. The next day, Bouterse resigned from the Army. On 24 December a military coup known as the "telephone coup" ousted President Shankar, and Ivan Graanoogst was appointed Acting President. On 29 December, Johan Kraag was chosen by the National Assembly as President of Suriname. On 30 December, Kraag asked Bouterse to return, who became Commander of the Army on 1 January 1991.

== See also ==
- History of Suriname

== Bibliography ==
- Janssen, Roger (2011). In Search of a Path: An Analysis of the Foreign Policy of Suriname from 1975 to 1991. Leiden: Brill. p. 208. ISBN 978-90-04-25367-4. JSTOR 10.1163/j.ctt1w8h0wm.

Political offices
Preceded by Fred Ramdat Misier	President of Suriname; 1988–1990	Succeeded by Johan Kraag
