= Jules Wijdenbosch =

President of Suriname from 1996 to 2000

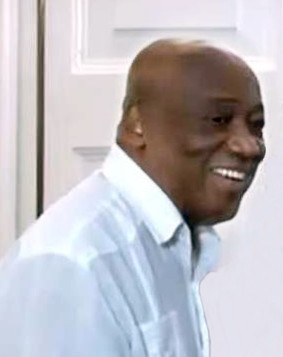

7th President of Suriname
- In office 15 September 1996 – 12 August 2000
- Vice President: Pretaap Radhakishun
- Preceded by: Ronald Venetiaan
- Succeeded by: Ronald Venetiaan

2nd Vice President of Suriname
- In office 7 January 1991 – 16 September 1991
- President: Johan Kraag
- Preceded by: Henck Arron
- Succeeded by: Jules Ajodhia

Prime Minister of Suriname
- In office 7 April 1987 – 26 January 1988
- President: Fred Ramdat Misier
- Preceded by: Pretaap Radhakishun
- Succeeded by: Position abolished

6th Deputy Prime Minister of Suriname
- In office 17 July 1986 – 7 April 1987
- Prime Minister: Pretaap Radhakishun
- Preceded by: Frank Leeflang
- Succeeded by: Harry Kensmil

Personal details
- Born: Jules Albert Wijdenbosch; 2 May 1941 Paramaribo, Surinam
- Died: 30 April 2025 (aged 83) Paramaribo, Suriname
- Party: National Democratic Party (1987–2000); Democratic National Platform 2000 (2000–2008); National Democratic Party (2008–2025)
- Education: University of Amsterdam

Jules Albert Wijdenbosch (2 May 1941 – 30 April 2025) was a Surinamese politician who served as the 7th President of Suriname from 1996 to 2000. Prior to his presidency he was Prime Minister of Suriname from 1987 to 1988, and the 2nd Vice President of Suriname in 1991.

== Early life ==
Jules Albert Wijdenbosch was born in Paramaribo on 2 May 1941. He was a trade union and youth leader and worked in a port as a customs officer. He studied political science and public administration in the University of Amsterdam. In 1975 he published a booklet titled Schets Surinaamse Republiek Eigen Stijl (Sketch of the Surinamese Republic in its own style), in which he called for the formation of a government with many councils and extensive authority for the president.

== Career ==
Wijdenbosch was a member of the National Democratic Party, which held absolute power in Suriname during the 1980s. From 1987 to 1988, he served asPrime Minister of Suriname and held concurrent positions as minister of Home Affairs, Justice and Foreign Affairs. He was the Vice President of Suriname from January 1991 until September 1991.

From 1996 to 2000, Wijdenbosch served as president of Suriname. The Jules Wijdenbosch Bridge was constructed over the Suriname River during his presidency. He attempted to sell Suriname's state-owned oil company Staatsolie Maatschappij Suriname in 1997, but was blocked by the company's management and its union.

Suriname's currency was devalued by the government in 1999, and inflation rose to 150%. A national strike broke out and Wijdenbosch's entire cabinet resigned. The 2000 election was held early due to protests against how Wijdenbosch's government handled the economy.

== Death ==
Wijdenbosch died in Paramaribo on 30 April 2025, and was given a state funeral.

== Works cited ==
- Singh, Chaitram (2014). "Suriname and the Limits of Consociationalism". Journal of Third World Studies. 31 (1). University Press of Florida: 131–148. doi:10.2307/45198767. JSTOR 45198767.

Political offices
Preceded by Pretaap Radhakishun	Prime Minister of Suriname; 1987–1988	Succeeded by Position abolished
Preceded by Henck Arron	Vice President of Suriname; 1991	Succeeded by Jules Ajodhia
Preceded by Ronald Venetiaan	President of Suriname; 1996–2000	Succeeded by Ronald Venetiaan
