= Constitution of Suriname =

National Constitution

The current Constitution of Suriname (Dutch: Grondwet van Suriname) was adopted on 30 September 1987, following a referendum. It marked the return to democracy after the Bouterse military dictatorship of the 1980s.

== History ==
After the Batavian Republic took over the Colony of Suriname from the Society of Suriname in 1795, the Dutch government issued various government regulations for Suriname (Dutch: Regeringsreglement voor Suriname), establishing the government of the colony. In 1865, a new government regulation replaced the previous regulation of 1832, which theoretically gave Suriname some limited self-rule. The colonial elite was given the right to elect a Colonial Council (Dutch: Koloniale Raad) which would co-govern the colony together with the Governor-General appointed by the Dutch crown. Among others, the Colonial Council was allowed to decide over the colony's budget, which was subject to approval by the Dutch crown, but which did not see any involvement of Dutch parliament.

In the wake of the 1922 Dutch constitutional revision, in which the term "colony" was replaced by the term "overseas territory", the 1865 government regulation was replaced by the Basic Law of Suriname (Dutch: Staatsregeling van Suriname) on 1 April 1937. This Basic Law renamed the Colonial Council to Estates of Suriname (Dutch: Staten van Suriname) and increased the membership from 13 to 15.

After the Second World War, during which the Dutch government-in-exile had pledged to review the relationship between the Netherlands and its colonies, the Basic Law was extensively revised. In March 1948, revisions to the Basic Law were adopted by Dutch parliament, which introduced universal suffrage for both men and women, which increased the membership of the Estates from 15 to 21, and which introduced a College of General Government (Dutch: College van Algemeen Bestuur) which was to assist the Governor in the everyday government of the colony, and which was the precursor to the Cabinet of Ministers. The new constitution took effect in July 1948.

After the Charter for the Kingdom of the Netherlands was proclaimed on 15 December 1954, Suriname ceased to be an overseas possession of the Netherlands, and rather became a constituent country of the Kingdom of the Netherlands, in which the Netherlands Antilles, Suriname and the Netherlands itself cooperated on a basis of equality. A new Basic Law that reflected the new constitutional arrangements was adopted by the Estates of Suriname in 1955.

The first constitution of independent Suriname was adopted in 1975, and was modeled after the Constitution of the Netherlands. It was suspended after the 1980 Surinamese coup d'état and was replaced by the current constitution after being approved in a referendum held on 30 September 1987.
