= Ronald Venetiaan =

President of Suriname (1991–1996; 2000–2010)

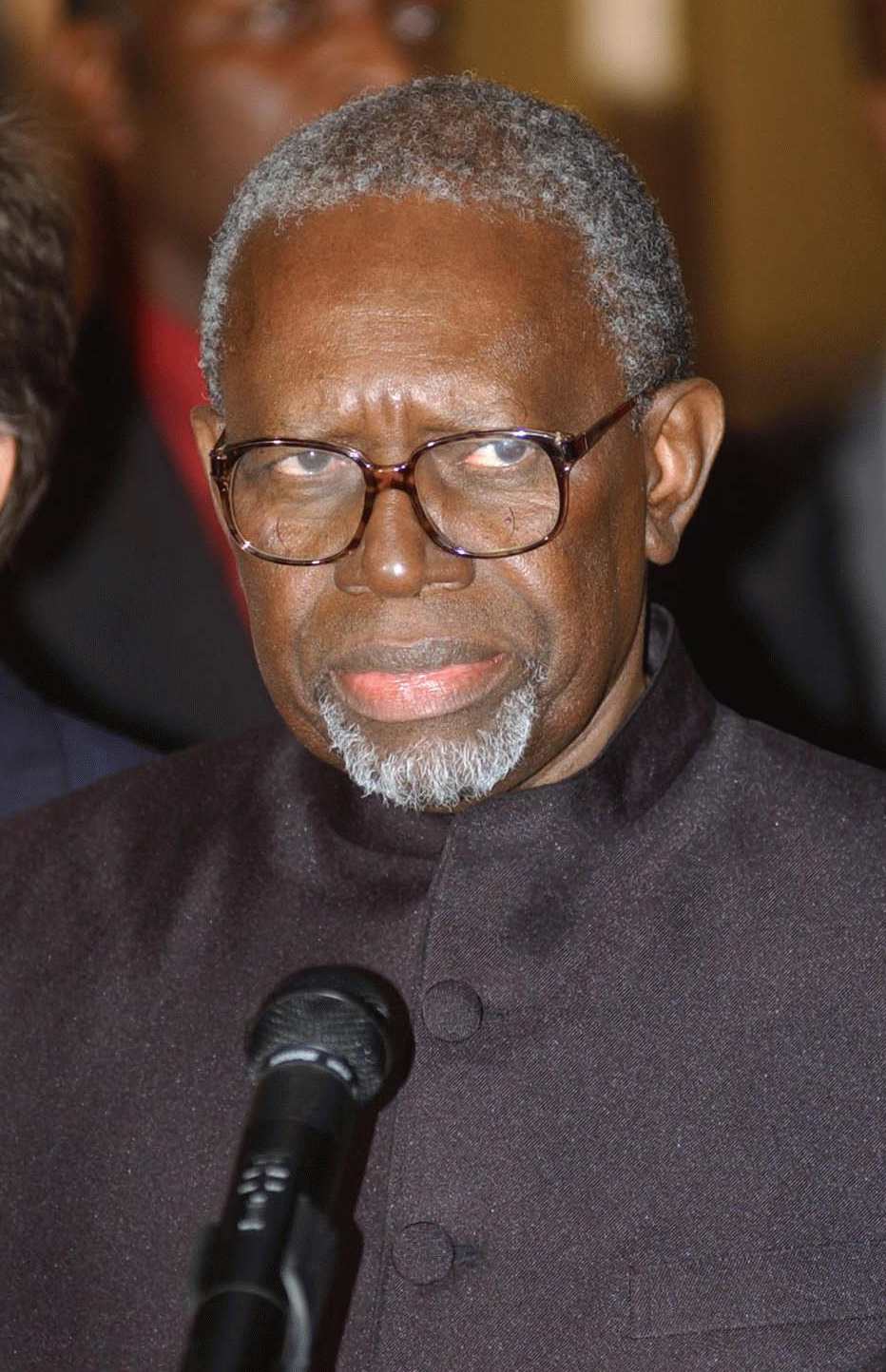
- Venetiaan in 2003

6th President of Suriname
- In office 12 August 2000 – 12 August 2010
- Vice President: Jules Ajodhia (2000–2005); Ram Sardjoe (2005–2010)
- Preceded by: Jules Wijdenbosch
- Succeeded by: Dési Bouterse
- In office 16 September 1991 – 15 September 1996
- Vice President: Jules Ajodhia
- Preceded by: Johan Kraag
- Succeeded by: Jules Wijdenbosch

Personal details
- Born: Ronald Runaldo Venetiaan; 18 June 1936 Paramaribo, Suriname
- Died: 5 November 2025 (aged 89) Paramaribo, Suriname
- Party: National Party
- Spouse: Liesbeth Vanenburg (m. 1966)
- Children: 4

Ronald Runaldo Venetiaan (18 June 1936 – 5 November 2025) was a Surinamese politician who served as President of Suriname between 1991 and 1996, and between 2000 and 2010.

== Early life and career ==
Venetiaan was born in Paramaribo on 18 June 1936. He left Suriname in 1955 and moved to the Netherlands to study mathematics and physics at the University of Leiden, graduating in 1964 and obtaining a doctorandus. Venetiaan returned to Suriname shortly afterwards and became a mathematics and physics teacher.

In 1973, Venetiaan served as Minister of Education for the National Party of Suriname (NPS) in the government of Henck Arron, until Arron's overthrow by the 1980 Surinamese coup d'état led by Dési Bouterse. He then decided to work as a professor at the Anton de Kom University.

In 1987, he returned to politics as the Chairman of the NPS, and served again as the Minister of Education. Venetiaan launched his first presidency bid in 1991, winning and serving until 1996, after which he lost in the elections to Jules Wijdenbosch. He was a candidate again in the 2000 election, when he regained his former position on the New Front banner. Venetiaan won an absolute majority of 37 from 51 votes in Parliament, and won his third term in 2005, completing the term until 2010. Venetiaan resigned as the Chair of the NPS and handed over the leadership to Gregory Rusland in 2012; he subsequently retired from politics in 2013, saying that "he thought that it was time that the younger generation take over".

== Personal life and death ==
Venetiaan was a mathematician, and an author. His first poetry book was written under the pseudonym Vene in the work Mamio (1962) and he used the pseudonym Krumanty in other writings. Although most of his works were never published, they were performed in theatre plays, and he collaborated on President Chan Santokhi's We gaan Suriname redden (We are going to save Suriname) book of 2020.

Venetiaan was married to Liesbeth Vanenburg, and had three daughters and one son. He died in Paramaribo on 5 November 2025, at the age of 89. President Jennifer Geerlings-Simons lamented his death and said that Venetiaan was "a statesman" and "great son of the nation", praising his commitment to democracy. Former President Santokhi expressed his condolences, adding that Venetiaan was "a statesman" whose death "leaves a great void."

== Honours ==
- Suriname:
  - Grand Cordon of the Honorary Order of the Yellow Star – 2020
  - Grand Cordon of the Honorary Order of the Palm – 1991
  - Commander of the Honorary Order of the Yellow Star – 1978
- Brazil:
  - Collar of the Order of the Southern Cross – 1995
- Netherlands:
  - Knight Grand Cross of the Order of Orange-Nassau – 1978
- Venezuela:
  - Collar of the Order of the Liberator – 1993

Political offices
Preceded by Johan Kraag	President of Suriname; 1991–1996	Succeeded by Jules Wijdenbosch
Preceded by Jules Wijdenbosch	President of Suriname; 2000–2010	Succeeded by Desi Bouterse
