= Suriname during World War II =

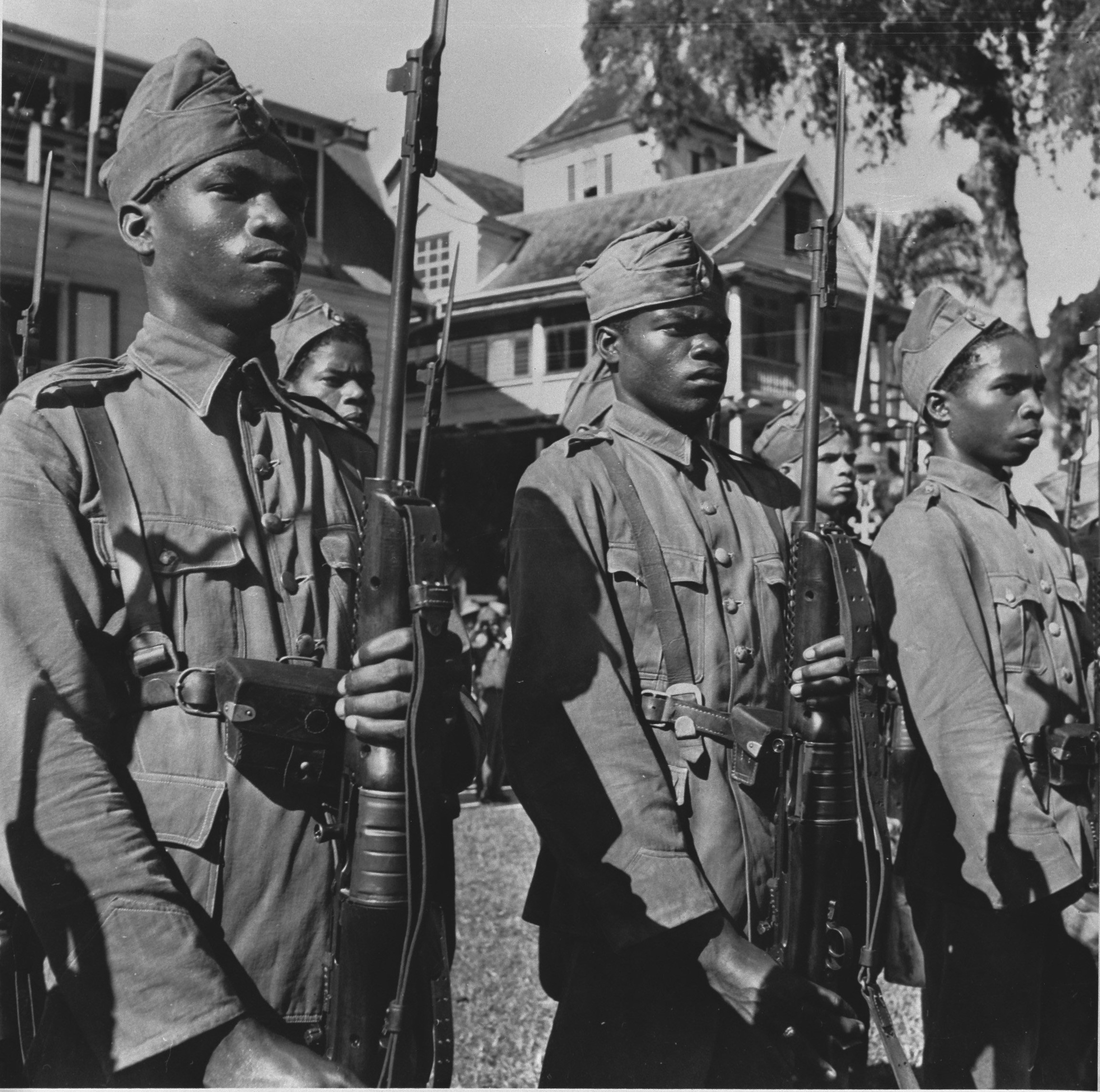
Soldiers of the Schutterij during the visit of Prince Bernhard (1943)

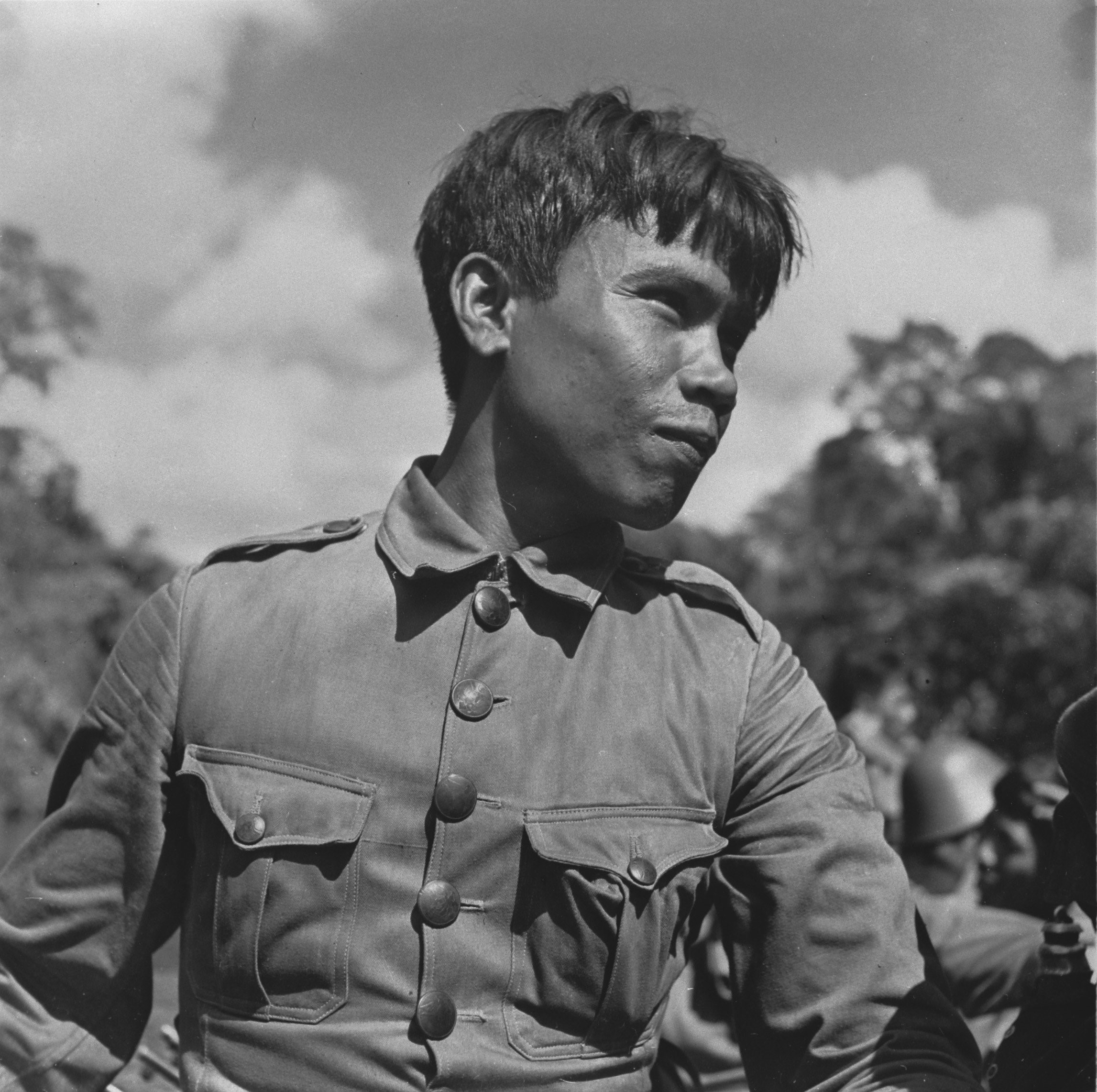
A Surinamese soldier

The history of Suriname during World War II was mainly focused on protecting the bauxite industry and guarding the borders with French Guiana which was part of Vichy France. From November 1941 onwards, 2,000 American troops were stationed in Suriname who transformed Airstrip Zanderij into a major airport, and constructed defensive works. No actual battles took place in Suriname. There was a political crisis in 1943, because Governor Johannes Kielstra used the state of emergency to imprison political opponents.

== History ==
Suriname was a colony of the Netherlands in 1940. At the start of the Battle of the Netherlands, it was defended by 200 soldiers of the Royal Netherlands East Indies Army (KNIL) and 180 local volunteers of the Schutterij. The KNIL soldiers were armed with carbines, including 120 M.95s, and under command of major Vink. Troops from the Schutterij were not allowed to be used outside of Suriname. On 5 September 1939, Goslar, a German steamship, asked for asylum in Suriname. On 10 May 1940 due to the German invasion of the Netherlands which started that day, she was scuttled by her crew, and her wreck is still visible in the Suriname River.

Surinam was protected by a single 200-strong company of Army infantry, supplemented by a militia rifle company and an old station ship.

Suriname was a major producer of bauxite which is used to make aluminium, a vital resource for the aircraft industry. Between 1940 and 1943, Suriname supplied 65% of American imports of bauxite. About 90% of all aluminium was used for military purposes. On 1 September 1941, three months before Pearl Harbor, President Franklin D. Roosevelt made an offer to Queen Wilhelmina to station 3,000 soldiers in Suriname. The number of troops was later revised to 2,000 soldiers and they were placed under the command of the KNIL. The Netherlands would be responsible for the financial costs. Attempts were made to expand the Schutterij, and at its height it comprised 5,000 volunteers.

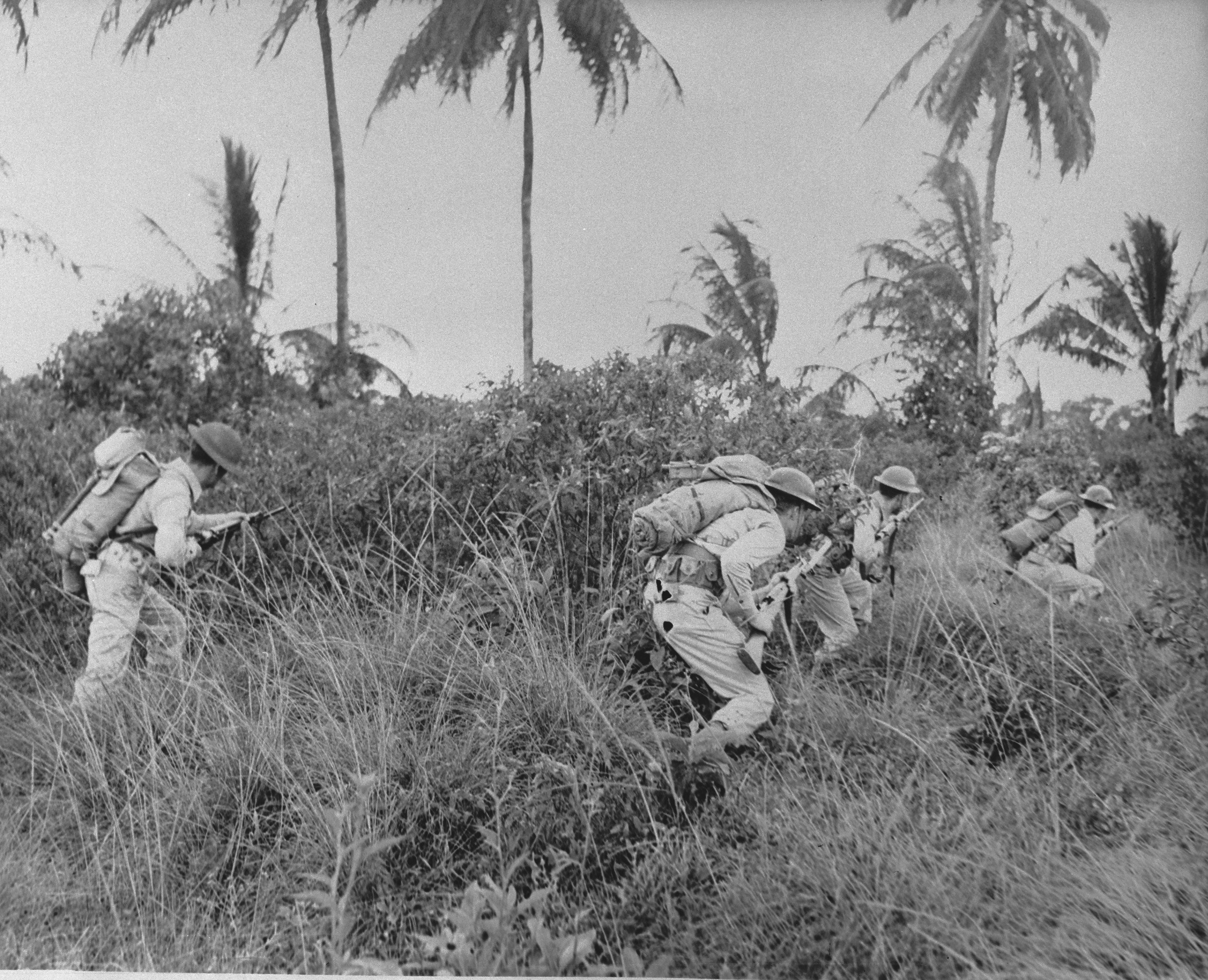
American soldiers training in Suriname

The American soldiers started to arrive from November 1941 onwards. In December 1941, the troops started to transform Airstrip Zanderij into the largest airport of South America at the time. The airport was constructed to protect ships and factories against U-boat attacks. On 16 February 1942, U-156 destroyed two oil tankers near Aruba, and then emerged to attack Lago Oil and Transport Company, the world's largest oil refinery. The crew forgot to remove the plug of the cannon, and the cannon exploded. In June 1942, about 22 per cent of the bauxite fleet had been destroyed in the Caribbean.

Another large airport near the border with Brazil was initially planned, however in February 1942, a mutual defence treaty was signed between the United States, Brazil, and Suriname.

The border with French Guiana, part of Vichy France, was a major concern, and was defended by the Schutterij. On 16 March 1943, French Guiana sided with Free France. In 1943, the American troops were replaced by Puerto Ricans.

== Political events ==
On 6 December 1942, Queen Wilhelmina made a speech about the necessity of a re-evaluation of the relationship with the colonies. Even though the speech was intended to keep Indonesia within the Kingdom, it was well received in Suriname, and would lead to the 1954 Charter for the Kingdom of the Netherlands in which Suriname became a constituent country within the Kingdom.

Governor Johannes Kielstra used the state of emergency to increase his power and circumvent the Estates of Suriname. In 1943, he would use his increased authority against political opponents like Eddy Bruma and Otto Huiswoud who were arrested and imprisoned without trial. On 23 July, Wim Bos Verschuur, a member of the Estates, petitioned Queen Wilhelmina to remove Kielstra from office. On 30 July, Verschuur was arrested and interned without trial. Subsequently, all elected members of the Estates handed in their resignation. On 28 December, Kielstra was given an honourable discharge by the Dutch government-in-exile.

== Internment ==
On the morning of 10 May 1940, 73 German men and a handful of anti-colonial activists were detained. An additional nine German men, 45 women, and 35 children were later arrested without regard for their political disposition. They were interned at Copieweg internment camp. In 1942, political prisoners from the Dutch East Indies were interned at Jodensavanne internment camp near the abandoned Jewish colony. In 1942, known prostitutes were interned at Katwijk plantation. They were released in 1944.

== Jewish immigration ==
There was traditionally a large Jewish presence in Suriname. In 1942, a group of 1,000 French Jews who had fled to Portugal were given permission to settle in Suriname. Later more would follow. At the 2012 census, only 181 people identified as Jewish.

== Volunteers ==
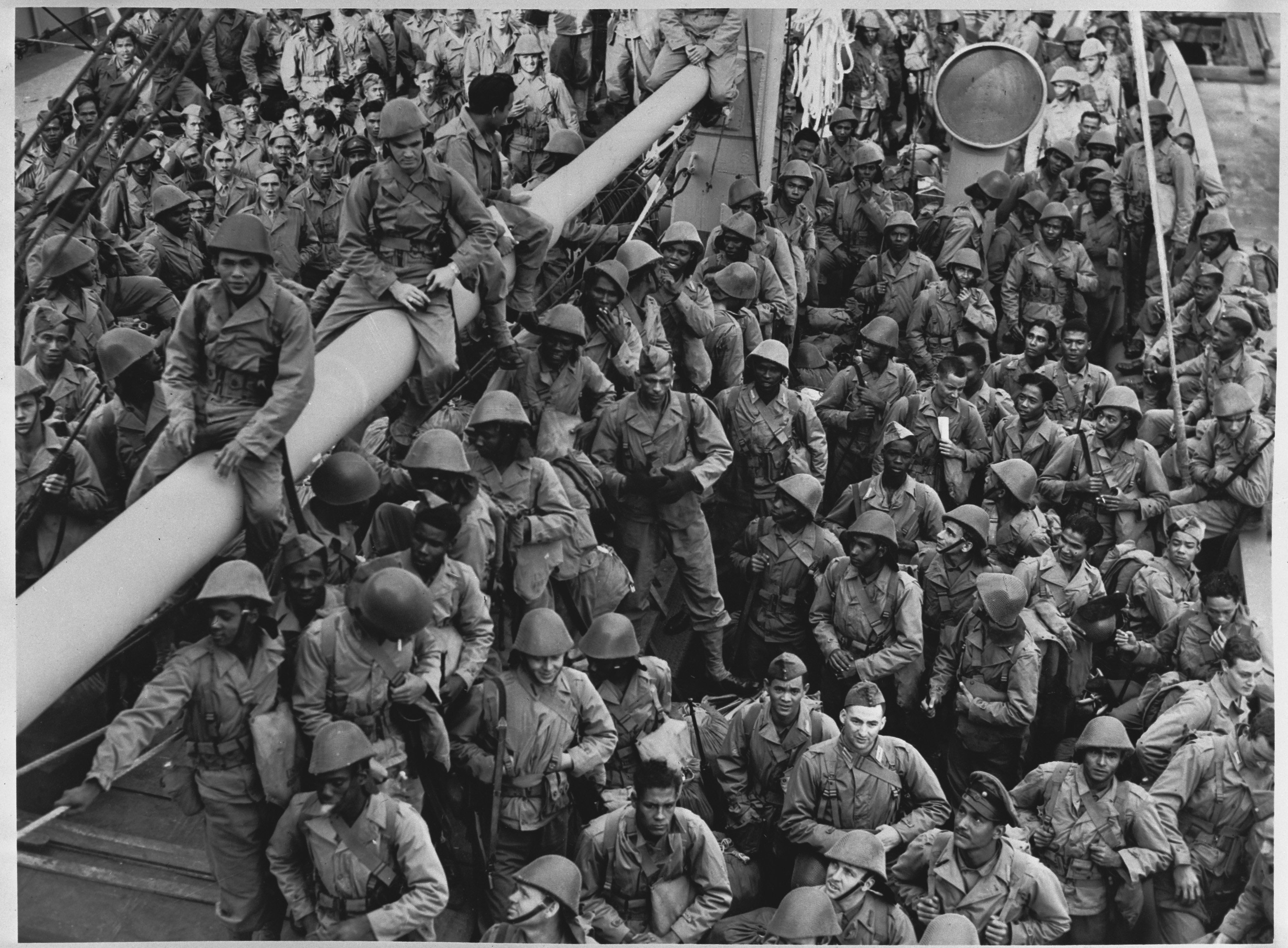
Surinamese volunteers arrive in Australia

There was support for the war effort among the Surinamese, but most were ambivalent about volunteering for armed service. There were about 400 volunteers who wanted to fight with Royal Netherlands Motorized Infantry Brigade in Great-Britain, however ethnic concerns and the relationship of the Dutch government-in-exile with South Africa and the enlistment of Dutch South Africans led the army to abandon the plan in 1941. Nevertheless, 15 volunteers from Suriname participated in the Normandy landings. Approximately 200 Surinamese served in the merchant navy.

About 450–500 volunteers enlisted with the Royal Netherlands East Indies Army (KNIL) upon the fall of Singapore and the Japanese invasion of the Dutch East Indies, now modern day Indonesia. Initially they were transported in 1942 to Casino, NSW, Australia. At Camp Victory, which was given with extraterritorial rights to the Dutch government-in-exile, formed as part of the 1st Infantry Battalion (KNIL). The soldiers were very poorly treated by their Dutch commanders, with being denied medical care, social services and only paid in virtually worthless Japanese Invasion Money. They were also forbidden to visit the town of Casino and not to mix with the local population, due to the racist ideology of their Dutch officers. After their training was complete, they were then moved north to Queensland before participating in the Pacific War in 1944 and 1945.

== Legacy ==
Even though no actual battles took place in Suriname, it revitalised the economy of the colony. The international airport and roads further helped develop the economy. During World War II, two bauxite factories opened in Paranam and Onverdacht. In 1941, Suriname had a government budget surplus for the first time in 75 years which would remain positive throughout the war. By the end of the war, bauxite production contributed one third of the country's gross domestic product. The de facto independence during the war set in motion a movement for democratisation and autonomy which would finally lead to independence in 1975.
