= Goslar (disambiguation) =

Goslar may refer to:

- Goslar, a city in Lower Saxony, Germany.
- Goslar (district), a district in Lower Saxony, Germany.
- Goslar (ship), a German steamboat scuttled in the Suriname River

== People ==
- Hanneli Goslar (1928-2022), a nurse and a former friend of Anne Frank
- Jürgen Goslar (1927-2021), a German actor
- Naphtali Hirsch Goslar (fl. 18th century), German rabbi and philosopher
