= David Findlay =

David Findlay may refer to:

- David George Findlay, a Surinamese politician
- David Findlay (filmmaker), a Canadian film director
