= SS Erlangen =

- SS Erlangen (1929), scuttled 25 July 1941
- SS Erlangen (1944), sunk by aircraft 4 September 1944

== See also ==
- Erlangen
