= The Sea Chase =

1955 film

- Directed by: John Farrow
- Screenplay by: James Warner Bellah and John Twist; Frank S. Nugent (uncredited)
- Based on: The Sea Chase; 1948 novel by Andrew Geer
- Produced by: John Farrow
- Starring: John Wayne; Lana Turner; David Farrar; Lyle Bettger; Tab Hunter; James Arness; Dick Davalos; John Qualen
- Narrated by: David Farrar
- Cinematography: William Clothier
- Edited by: William Ziegler
- Music by: Roy Webb
- Distributed by: Warner Bros. Pictures
- Release date: June 4, 1955
- Running time: 116-17 minutes
- Country: United States
- Language: English
- Box office: $6 million (US)

The Sea Chase is a 1955 World War II drama film starring John Wayne and Lana Turner, and featuring David Farrar, Lyle Bettger, and Tab Hunter. It was directed by John Farrow from a screenplay by James Warner Bellah and John Twist based on the novel of the same name by Andrew Geer. The plot is a nautical cat-and-mouse adventure, with Wayne determined to get his freighter home to Germany during the opening months of World War II, chased relentlessly across the Pacific then Atlantic Oceans by the Australian and then British navies.

The film was shot in CinemaScope and WarnerColor.

== Plot ==
Captain Karl Ehrlich is the master of the aging German steam freighter Ergenstrasse, home port Hamburg, docked at Sydney, Australia, on the eve of the Second World War. Ehrlich is a former German Navy officer, who lost his command after refusing to support the Nazi regime. As his ship prepares for sea to avoid internment, Erlich meets with an old friend, British Royal Navy Lieutenant Commander Jeff Napier, and Napier's German fiancée Elsa Keller. Ehrlich knows Elsa has a dubious past and tries to break them up by reminding Elsa of her past trysts, to which she chuckles and smiles.

With war imminent because Germany has invaded Poland, the Ergenstrasse prepares to slip away. The German consul-general asks Ehrlich to transport an Abwehr spy who risks capture. Only when leaving Sydney, in thick fog during night, does Ehrlich discover the spy is Elsa, who had seduced Napier and drawn out military information from him. Elsa is cynically dismissive of Ehrlich's personal integrity. Ehrlich's chief officer, the pro-Nazi Kirchner, who is also with German intelligence, soon makes advances on Elsa. Erlich intervenes and stymies Kirchner's overtures towards Elsa.

Old, slow, and short on coal, the Ergenstrasse is seen as easy prey by the Royal Australian Navy and by Napier in particular, who understandably holds a grudge. The wily Ehrlich leads his enemies on a chase across the Pacific Ocean, pausing only briefly for supplies at an unmanned rescue station on Auckland Island. Three fishermen are already marooned there, but Kirchner casually murders them and takes most of their supplies. He tells no one. The pursuing Napier discovers the bodies, and believing his old friend is responsible, vows to bring Ehrlich to justice as a war criminal.

Ehrlich, meanwhile, sets course for the remote, uninhabited Pacific island of Pom Pom Galli (Note: This fictitious island is also mentioned in the film La Classe américaine (1993).) in the Tuamotus. Running out of coal, Ehrlich begins burning wood from the ship for fuel, upsetting crewmen when the lifeboats are burned. A potential mutiny is averted as they reach the island. While Ehrlich drives the crew to harvest timber there for fuel, he impresses Elsa with his humane side. Discovering that Kirchner murdered the fishermen, an angry Ehrlich forces him to sign an account of his actions in the ship's log. Then, Erlich punches Kirchner in the mouth, drawing blood and knocking his hair askew.

Napier finally convinces the Rockhampton's captain that Ehrlich will be at Pom Pom Galli, but they arrive too late. Both ships make for Valparaíso in neutral Chile, where Napier cannot attack. In port, a frustrated Napier confronts Ehrlich about the murders, slapping Erlich and calling him a murderer and coward. Ehrlich says that if they catch the Ergenstrasse, they can read the truth in his log. Meanwhile, Elsa learns the truth herself, distances herself from Kirchner, and declares her love for Ehrlich. They share the captain's cabin for the remainder of the voyage.

Luck is with the Ergenstrasse when the Rockhampton is called away to support cruisers facing the German pocket battleship Graf Spee in Montevideo, Uruguay. Napier requests a transfer to the British naval patrols in the North Sea, believing that Ehrlich must pass that way in his attempt to reach Kiel. Napier flies to England as the Ergenstrasse, resupplied with coal and lifeboats, departs for Germany.

For political reasons, German radio broadcasts a message through Lord Haw-Haw disclosing the Ergenstrasse's position near Norway, thus exposing the ship to the Royal Navy and the prowling Napier, now commanding a corvette. Napier tracks down Ehrlich's ship and sinks her in the North Sea. Ehrlich orders the crew to evacuate and take the ship's log. Then, instead of the swastika flag of the Third Reich, Ehrlich hoists the battle flag of the Imperial German Navy, in which he had been an officer aboard the SMS Moltke at the Battle of Jutland. Only Elsa, an unwilling Kirchner, and he remain aboard for a short, one-sided battle, during which Erlich and Kirchner get into another fight and Elsa embraces Erlich as the Ergenstrasse is bombarded. Their fate is unclear, but the other crewmen hand over the log, proving to Napier that Kirchner committed the murders alone.

== Cast ==
- John Wayne as Captain Karl Ehrlich
- Lana Turner as Elsa Keller
- David Farrar as Lieutenant Commander Jeff Napier
- Lyle Bettger as Chief Officer Kirchner
- Tab Hunter as Cadet Wesser
- James Arness as Schleiter
- Dick Davalos as Cadet Walter Stemme
- John Qualen as Chief Engineer Schmitt
- Paul Fix as Max Heinz
- Lowell Gilmore as Captain Evans
- Luis Van Rooten as Matz
- Alan Hale as Wentz
- Wilton Graff as Consul-General Hepke
- Peter Whitney as Bachman
- Claude Akin as Winkler
- John Doucette as Bos'n
- Alan Lee as Brounck

Cast notes:

- Australian actor Michael Pate was announced to be playing the ship's radio operator, but he does not appear in the final film.
- In an unintentional parallel with her character Elsa in this film, actress Lana Turner had several relationships with men and was married seven times.

== Production ==
Warner Bros. Pictures bought the film rights to the novel, which was published in 1948, and John Wayne was announced for the lead in June 1951, with Bolton Mallory reported to be working on the script. Soon after, James Warner Bellah was announced as working on the script.

Production of the film was delayed for a while. In August 1953, John Farrow, who had made Hondo with Wayne, signed as director. Frank Nugent rewrote the script. Filming finally began in September 1954. MGM lent Lana Turner to the production for this film.

John Wayne later said Farrow "didn't really have a great deal to do with" Hondo because it was a Batjac production and "Everything was set up before he came on it. But he did direct Sea Chase and prove to me that he should not be put in charge of a producer-director position. He failed to tell the good story that was in the book. But now, we're talking about a matter of opinion and that's only my opinion. For some, he may be considered a fine director."

Although both the Caribbean Sea and the coastline of Mexico were considered as shooting locations, some parts of the film were shot in the waters around the Hawaiian Islands.

John Wayne came down with ear infections twice during the shooting of the film, and two other actors received infections due to skin diving.

The song that Lana Turner sings is "Steh' Ich im Finster Mitternacht", which is also known as "Treue Liebe". The German song had English lyrics written specifically for the film.

The fictional HMAS Rockhampton is played by HMCS New Glasgow, a Canadian River-class frigate as a wartime emergency antisubmarine escort. She was placed in reserve in 1945, but in 1954 had recently been updated and recommissioned as a Prestonian-class frigate. This class has a classic wartime outline, similar to the Black Swan and Grimsby-class sloops operated by the Royal Navy and Royal Australian Navy in 1939, including HMS Morecambe Bay and Wellington, which served in the Pacific, and is now a museum ship on the River Thames in London.

A discovery of a different version the film's script suggests an alternative ending in which Kirchner drowns and Erlich and Elsa are rescued, only to be thrown overboard on Napier's orders after he discovers that Elsa has been unfaithful to him with Erlich.

== Factual basis ==
The script was adapted from a novel of the same name by Andrew Geer, which in turn was based on an incident involving the 1929-built German Norddeutscher Lloyd steamer Erlangen (6,100 tons). Under the captaincy of Alfred Grams, the freighter slipped out of Otago Harbour, New Zealand, on 28 August 1939, on the very eve of war, ostensibly for Port Kembla, New South Wales, where she was to have filled her coal bunkers for the homeward passage to Europe.

She then headed for the subantarctic Auckland Islands, where she successfully evaded the cruiser HMNZS Leander and restocked with food and wood, cutting down large swathes of the southern rātā forest on the shores of Carnley Harbour. The freighter then made a desperate and successful escape, using jerry-rigged sails, to Ancud in southern Chile. She subsequently made her way into the South Atlantic, where she was intercepted off Montevideo on 24 July 1941 by HMS Newcastle and scuttled by her crew.

Though using the same basic plot as the film, the book painted Kirchner as the hero and Ehrlich as the villain, essentially swapping their roles; the book portrays Kirchner and Keller as unintended victims of Erlich's obsession, though in both stories, the key characters all appear to go down with the ship at the climax.

A Bathurst-class corvette named HMAS Rockhampton was built by Walkers Limited in Queensland in 1942 for the Royal Australian Navy. She operated in Australian and New Guinea waters during the later years of the war, three years after the events depicted in the film.

== See also ==
- List of American films of 1955
- List of World War II films
- John Wayne filmography
