= 1946 Surinamese general election =

General elections were held in Suriname in February and March 1946 to elect ten members of the Estates.

== Electoral system ==
The States consisted of ten elected members and five members appointed by the governor. The elections were held using the two-round system, with suffrage restricted to men who held a diploma from extended primary education, although women were allowed to stand as candidates. Voters had multiple votes, and any candidate receiving a number of votes equivalent to over 50% of the valid ballots cast was elected in the first round. If not all seats were filled, a second round was held.

== Results ==
As there were 1,454 valid votes, candidates required 728 to be elected in the first round.

Candidate	First round		Second round		Notes
Candidate	Votes	%	Votes	%	Notes
Wim Bos Verschuur	1,198	82.39			Re-elected
Arnold Smit	1,053	72.42			Re-elected
Johann Achmed de Miranda	1,006	69.19			Re-elected
Frederik Lim A Po	984	67.68			Re-elected
David George Findlay	851	58.53			Elected
Johan Ferrier	824	56.67			Elected
Emile de la Fuente	795	54.68			Elected
Jozeph Enwoei Ho A Sjoe	721	49.59	731	54.72	Elected
Cornelis Jong Baw	665	45.74	537	40.19	Re-elected
L.M. Meursinge	662	45.53	536	40.12	
Thomas Waller	653	44.91	668	50.00	Elected
Albert Calor	520	35.76	430	32.19	Unseated
Rudolf Bernhard William Comvalius	398	27.37	461	34.51	
Grace Schneiders-Howard	376	25.86			
H. Seljee	350	24.07			
S.F. Helstone	293	20.15			
L.C.R. Vrede	226	15.54			
James Alexander Mac May	203	13.96			
William Emanuël Juglall	193	13.27			
C.E. Wolff	103	7.08			
C. Prins	75	5.16			
A.A. Warner	64	4.40			
Total	12,213	100.00	3,363	100.00	
Valid votes	1,454	91.68	1,318	93.28	
Invalid/blank votes	132	8.32	95	6.72	
Total votes	1,586	100.00	1,413	100.00	
Registered voters/turnout	2,945	53.85	2,945	47.98	
Source: Het nieuws, Het nieuws

== Aftermath ==
Following the elections Governor Johannes Brons appointed Adriaan Alberga, Ming Doelman, Asgar Karamat Ali, Herman Luitink and Sewraam Rambaran Mishre as the nominated members. Frederik Lim A Po became chair of the States.

In late 1946 Henry Lucien de Vries replaced Alberga as a nominated member.

Frederik Lim A Po resigned in 1947 and was replaced by Percy Wijngaarde, after which de Vries became the new chair.

Candidate	Party	Votes	%
Percy Wijngaarde	National Party of Suriname	1,049	69.84
Paul Wong		266	17.71
Ludwig Sitalsing		187	12.45
Total		1,502	100.00
Valid votes		1,502	91.42
Invalid/blank votes		141	8.58
Total votes		1,643	100.00
Registered voters/turnout		3,484	47.16
Source: Het nieuws

Johan Ferrier resigned in 1948 and was replaced by Leo Lauriers as a result of a May by-election.

Candidate	Votes	%
Leo Lauriers	1,140	79.55
Radakishun	171	11.93
Wolff	122	8.51
Total	1,433	100.00
Valid votes	1,433	91.74
Invalid/blank votes	129	8.26
Total votes	1,562	100.00
Registered voters/turnout	3,261	47.90
Source: Het nieuws

After Thomas Waller was appointed to the Board of Social Assistance in 1948, he was replaced by Gerard van der Schroeff as a result of a June by-election.

Candidate	Votes	%
Gerard van der Schroeff	988	68.00
Correia	225	15.49
Vrede	134	9.22
Ludwig Sitalsing	106	7.30
Total	1,453	100.00
Valid votes	1,453	94.17
Invalid/blank votes	90	5.83
Total votes	1,543	100.00
Registered voters/turnout	3,261	47.32
Source: Het nieuws

Later in 1948 Arnold Smit resigned and was replaced by Otto Wong as a result of an August by-election.

Candidate	Votes	%
Otto Wong	683	72.81
S.F. Helstone	183	19.51
H. Radakishun	72	7.68
Total	938	100.00
Valid votes	938	92.32
Invalid/blank votes	78	7.68
Total votes	1,016	100.00
Source: Het nieuws

In 1949 de Vries resigned and was replaced by Archibald Currie.
