= 1942 Surinamese general election =

General elections were held in Suriname on 13 February and 20 March 1942 to elect ten members of the Estates.

== Electoral system ==
The States consisted of ten elected members and five members appointed by the governor. The elections were held using the two-round system, with suffrage restricted to men who held a diploma from extended primary education, although women were allowed to stand as candidates. Voters had multiple votes, and any candidate receiving a number of votes equivalent to over 50% of the valid ballots cast was elected in the first round. If not all seats were filled, a second round was held.

== Results ==
As there were 1,066 valid votes, candidates required 534 to be elected in the first round.

Candidate	First round		Second round		Notes
Candidate	Votes	%	Votes	%	Notes
William Kraan	838	78.61			Re-elected
Frederik Lim A Po	829	77.77			Re-elected
Julius del Prado	747	70.08			Re-elected
Gerson Philip Zaal	717	67.26			Re-elected
Albert Calor	665	62.38			Re-elected
Julius Caesar de Miranda	619	58.07			Elected
Wim Bos Verschuur	540	50.66			Elected
Clemens Ramkisoen Biswamitre	435	40.81	331	34.52	Unseated
Piet Payens	413	38.74	434	45.26	Elected
Cornelis Jong Baw	407	38.18	441	45.99	Elected
Jo Einaar	389	36.49	424	44.21	Elected
Grace Schneiders-Howard	366	34.33	411	42.86	Unseated
David Simons	354	33.21	389	40.56	
S.F. Helstone	324	30.39			
Johann Achmed de Miranda	309	28.99			
Huerta Milano Celvius Bergen	241	22.61			
James Alexander Mac May	239	22.42			
D. Coppoolse	126	11.82			
Total	8,558	100.00	2,430	100.00	
Valid votes	1,066	88.03	959	89.79	
Invalid/blank votes	145	11.97	109	10.21	
Total votes	1,211	100.00	1,068	100.00	
Source: De West, De West

== Aftermath ==
Following the elections Governor Johannes Kielstra appointed Gerrit Fikkert, Asgar Karamat Ali, Herman Luitink, Hendrik Miskin and Jagesar Persad Kaulesar Sukul as the nominated members. Julius del Prado became chair of the States.

In 1943 Wim Bos Verschuur was imprisoned without trial after petitioning Queen Wilhelmina to remove Kiestra from office. In protest, all other elected members of the States (except Albert Calor who was overseas) resigned. They were all subsequently re-elected in September 1943 by-elections; Bos Verschuur was replaced by Johann Achmed de Miranda, who had promised to resign once Bos Verschuur was released.

Candidate	Votes	%	Notes
William Kraan	1,239	93.23	Re-elected
Frederik Lim A Po	1,228	92.40	Re-elected
Julius Caesar de Miranda	1,216	91.50	Re-elected
Piet Payens	1,203	90.52	Re-elected
Julius del Prado	1,194	89.84	Re-elected
Johann Achmed de Miranda	1,193	89.77	Elected
Cornelis Jong Baw	1,184	89.09	Re-elected
Jo Einaar	1,180	88.79	Re-elected
Gerson Philip Zaal	1,136	85.48	Re-elected
Grace Schneiders-Howard	134	10.08	
Gravenbergh	65	4.89	
Wolff	52	3.91	
Total	11,024	100.00	
Valid votes	1,329	87.72	
Invalid/blank votes	186	12.28	
Total votes	1,515	100.00	
Registered voters/turnout	2,490	60.84	
Source: De West

After Bos Verschuur was released following an honourable discharge by the Dutch government-in-exile, de Miranda stood down and Bos Verschuur was declared elected unopposed in January 1945.

Gerson Philip Zaal and Julius del Prado resigned later in 1945 and were replaced by the returning de Miranda and Arnold Smit in the subsequent by-election in May.

Candidate	First round		Second round		Notes
Candidate	Votes	%	Votes	%	Notes
Johann Achmed de Miranda	821	67.30			Elected
Arnold Smit	393	32.21	556	60.30	Elected
Johan Ferrier	341	27.95	366	39.70	
Jozeph Enwoei Ho A Sjoe	263	21.56			
Helstone	208	17.05			
van der Schroeff	166	13.61			
Lionarons	84	6.89			
Total	2,276	100.00	922	100.00	
Valid votes	1,220	91.59	922	89.43	
Invalid/blank votes	112	8.41	109	10.57	
Total votes	1,332	100.00	1,031	100.00	
Source: De West, De West

Later in the same year Jo Einaar resigned and was replaced by Thomas Waller, who was declared elected unopposed on 1 October.
