= Jules Sedney Harbour =

Harbour in Paramaribo, Suriname

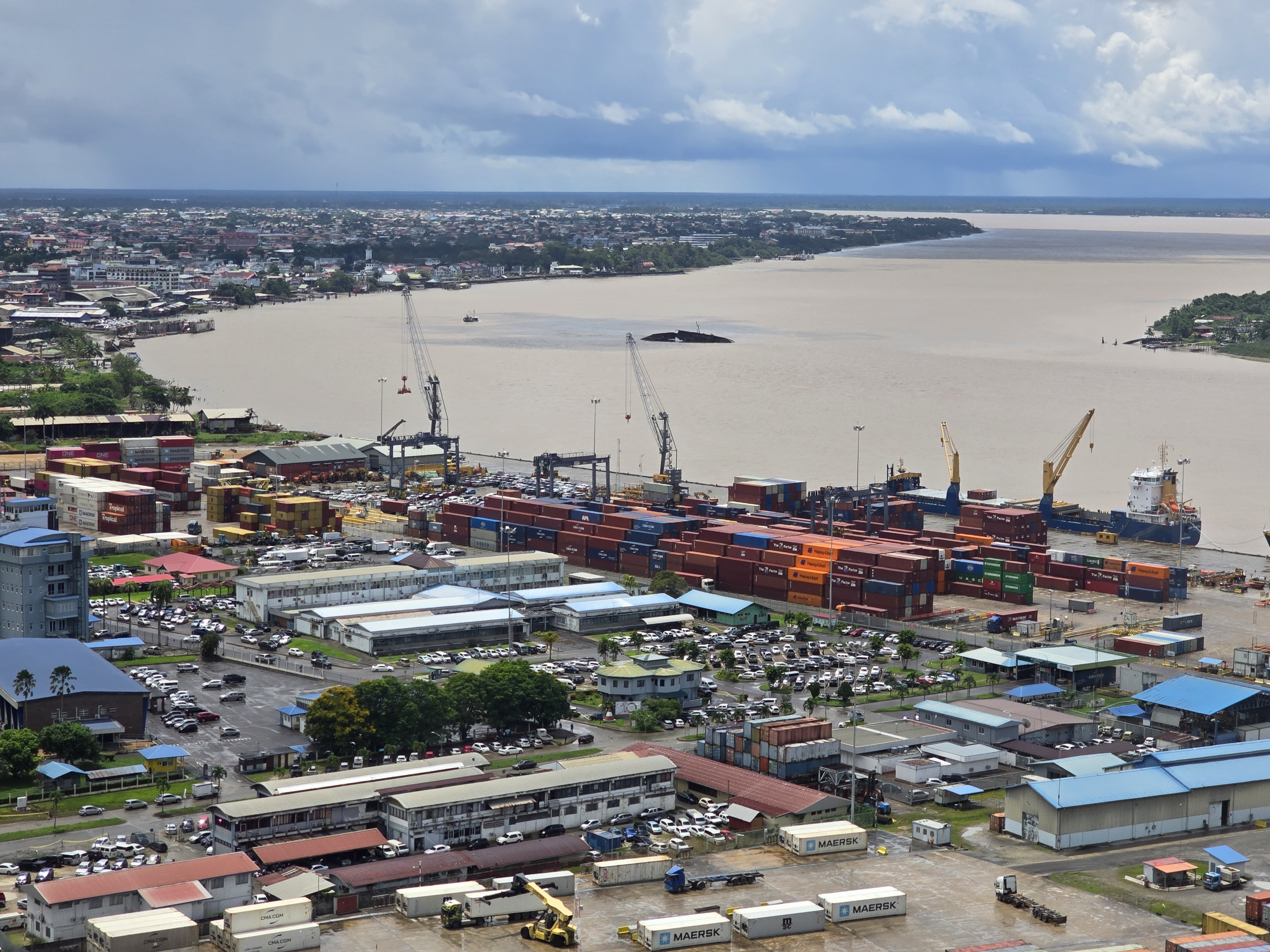
- Interactive map of Jules Sedney Harbour
- Location in Suriname

Location
- Country: Suriname
- Location: Beekhuizen, Paramaribo, Suriname
- Coordinates: 5.812582°N 55.165705°W
- UN/LOCODE: SRPBM

Details
- Opened: 1965
- Operated by: Havenbeheer Suriname
- Size: 60 hectares (150 acres)

Statistics
- Website havenbeheer.com

Jules Sedney Harbour is the main seaport for cargo ships in Paramaribo, Suriname. Until 2016, the harbour was called Nieuwe Haven (New Harbour). It is one of the two main cargo ports of Suriname. The other being Nieuw-Nickerie. Paramaribo used to have a generic harbour at Waterkant. In 1965, Nieuwe Haven opened as a specialised cargo harbour.

== History ==
In 1683, Suriname was captured by the Dutch Republic from the British. The Suriname River near the village of Paramaribo was more than one kilometre wide, and Waterkant, the water side, became the main harbour for the colony. In the mid 20th century, the harbour became ill-suited for large cargo ships. On 5 June 1960, the government purchased 12.35 hectares (30.5 acres) of land for the construction of a new harbour. In 1965, Nieuwe Haven opened as a specialised cargo harbour. The ferries still use the old facilities at Waterkant. On 11 November 1971, Havenbeheer Suriname was founded to operate the Nieuwe Haven.

The harbour was enlarged with a dedicated oil terminal. The harbour was originally designed for bulk transport, it was later rehabilitated for container transport. On 11 November 2016, the harbour was renamed Jules Sedney Harbour after Prime minister Jules Sedney in recognition for his involvement in the founding of the harbour.

== Award winning ==
The Jules Sedney Haven has won the Best Container Port Award of the Caribbean Shipping Association (CSA) in 2012, 2014, 2015 and 2022.

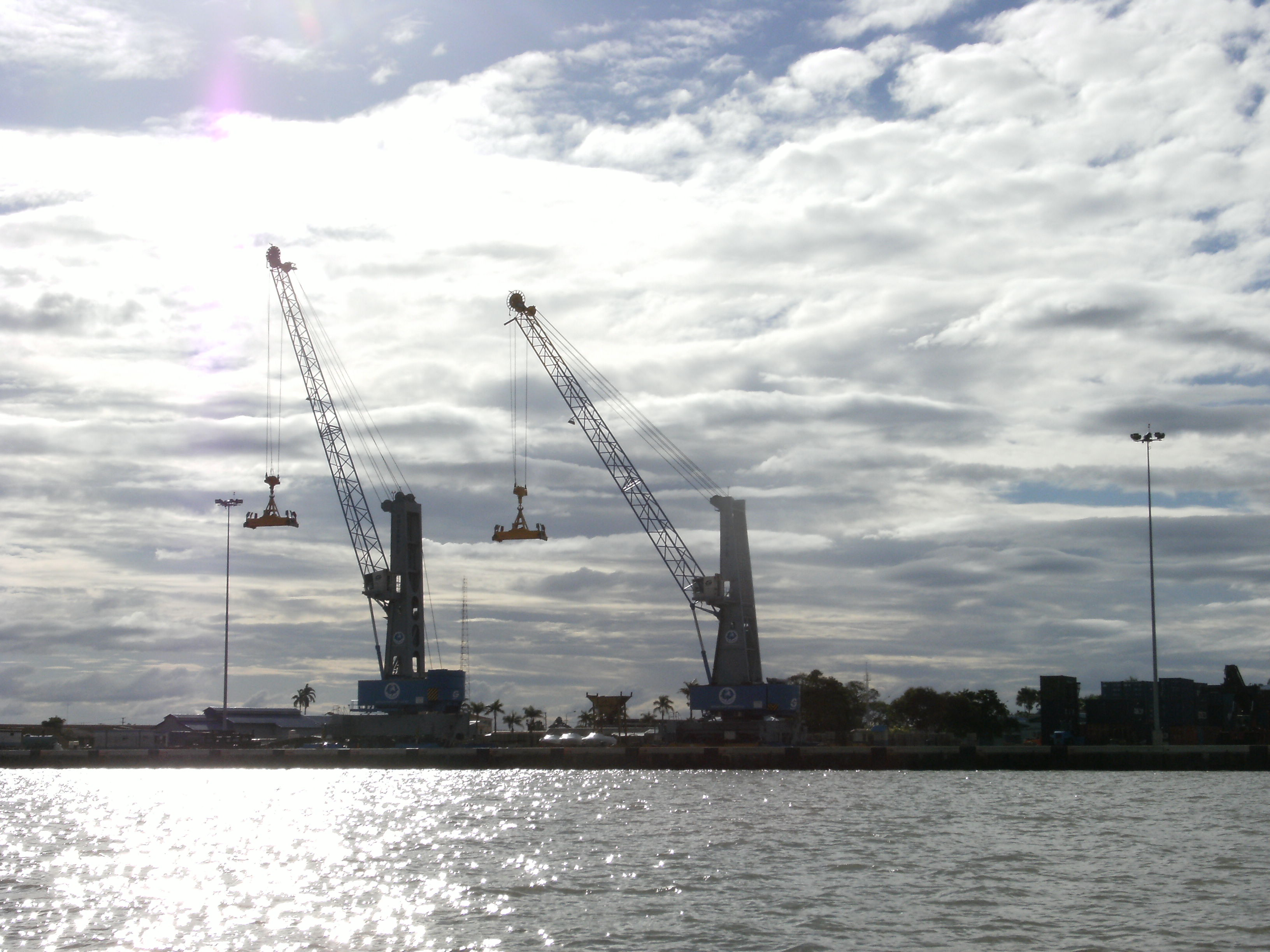
Cranes at the harbour, 2009
