= Louis Doedel =

Surinamese trade unionist

- Born: Louis Alfred Gerardus Doedel; 26 July 1905; Paramaribo, Surinam
- Died: 10 January 1980 (aged 74); Paramaribo, Suriname
- Occupation: union leader

Louis Alfred Gerardus Doedel (26 July 1905 – 10 January 1980) was a Surinamese trade unionist. On 29 May 1937, he was involuntarily committed at the Wolfenbüttel psychiatric hospital by Governor Johannes Kielstra. Doedel was forgotten by the public and often presumed dead. He was not released until late 1979, and died shortly after release.

== Biography ==
Louis Doedel was born on 26 July 1905 in Paramaribo as an illegitimate child. In 1928, he went to Curaçao hoping to get a job at the Shell oil refinery. He found a job at the taxation office, however, his revolutionary ideas drew the attention of the police. On 28 February 1931, he was deported back to Suriname.

On 25 May 1931, Doedel founded a committee for the unemployed which was later renamed Surinaamse Volksbond. On 28 October 1931, a protest organised by Doedel turned into a two-day riot resulting in one death, two wounded, and 56 arrests. In 1932, he founded SAWO, a trade union, which was officially recognized. On 28 May 1937, he demanded to speak with Governor Kielstra, who refused to see him. The next day, Doedel returned covered in white clay, because white people were allowed in, and dropped his pants.

Kielstra used this incident to have Doedel involuntarily committed at the Wolfenbüttel psychiatric hospital. Officially, it was an observation for 28 days. On 18 March 1938, Doedel wrote a letter to Kielstra apologising for the incident, and asked to be allowed to work on a piece of land in Saramacca. His plea was ignored. During his stay at Wolfenbüttel, he received electroconvulsive therapy.

To the outside world, Doedel was forgotten and often presumed dead. After 43 years of commitment, he was finally released in late 1979. At his release, he was no longer able to walk or talk. Doedel died several days later on 10 January 1980, at the age of 74. The government paid for his burial.

== Aftermath ==
In 1998, Emile Wijntuin, former chairperson of parliament, wrote Louis Doedel, martelaar voor het Surinaamse volk (Louis Doedel, martyr for the Surinamese people), a biography about Doedel. Wijntuin also founded Comité Eerherstel Louis Doedel which aims to rehabilitate his name.

In 1999, Frank Zichem created a documentary about Nina Jurna, his niece, trying to piece together the story of her great-uncle.

On 10 January 2010, a bust was revealed in his honour on the terrain of SIVIS.

On 18 February 2021, the medical files of Doedel were released to his family.

== See also ==
- Political abuse of psychiatry
