= 1938 Surinamese general election =

General elections were held in Surinam on 14 February and 23 March 1938 to choose the ten elected members of the Estates. Grace Schneiders-Howard was the only female candidate and was successful in the second round of voting, becoming the first woman elected in the Surinamese legislature.

== Electoral system ==
The elections were held using a two-round system in a single nationwide constituency. To be elected in the first round, a candidate had to receive more votes than 50% of the valid ballots cast. If a second round was required the number of candidates was twice the number of seats available. Suffrage was limited to men paying poll tax, although women were allowed to stand as candidates.

== Campaign ==
A total of 22 candidates contested the ten seats. Although not able to vote, a group of creole market women set up the Social Democratic Women's League to campaign for Schneiders-Howard.

== Results ==
Six candidates were elected in the first round, receiving 619 or more votes. A further four were elected in the second. Seven of the winning candidates were incumbent members.

Candidate	First round		Second round		Notes
Candidate	Votes	%	Votes	%	Notes
William Kraan	953	77.04			Re-elected
Karel Johannes van Erpecum	863	69.77			Re-elected
Julius del Prado	773	62.49			Re-elected
Clemens Ramkisoen Biswamitre	668	54.00			Re-elected
Frederik Lim A Po	653	52.79			Elected
Philip Samson	644	52.06			Re-elected
Gerson Philip Zaal	607	49.07	611	62.41	Re-elected
Cornelis William Naar	560	45.27	490	50.05	Re-elected
Henry George Willem de Miranda	543	43.90	263	26.86	Unseated
Albert Calor	445	35.97	467	47.70	Elected
Grace Schneiders-Howard	442	35.73	462	47.19	Elected
David Simons	430	34.76	351	35.85	Unseated
Henk van Ommeren	352	28.46	374	38.20	
C.E. Wolf	281	22.72	320	32.69	
J.F.D. Haenen	265	21.42			
J.P. Schüngel	283	22.88			
James Alexander Mac May	232	18.76			
C.R. Schoonhoven	205	16.57			
J.M.C. Parisius	195	15.76			
Th.A.C. Comvalius	180	14.55			
Albert Gustaaf Putscher	149	12.05			Unseated
S. Laret	132	10.67			
Total	9,855	100.00	3,338	100.00	
Valid votes	1,237	90.29	979	93.86	
Invalid/blank votes	133	9.71	64	6.14	
Total votes	1,370	100.00	1,043	100.00	
Registered voters/turnout	2,417	56.68	2,417	43.15	
Source: De Surinamer, Suriname

== Aftermath ==
Following the elections, five additional members were appointed by the Governor on 30 March: Rachoenandan Brahma Tewari, Nicolaas Cornelis van Gheel Gildemeester, Jagesar Persad Kaulesar Sukul, Hendrik Miskin and Willem Vogel.

Karel Johannes van Erpecum became Chairman of the Estates and Philip Samson vice-president.
