= SS Erlangen (1929) =

German cargo steamship

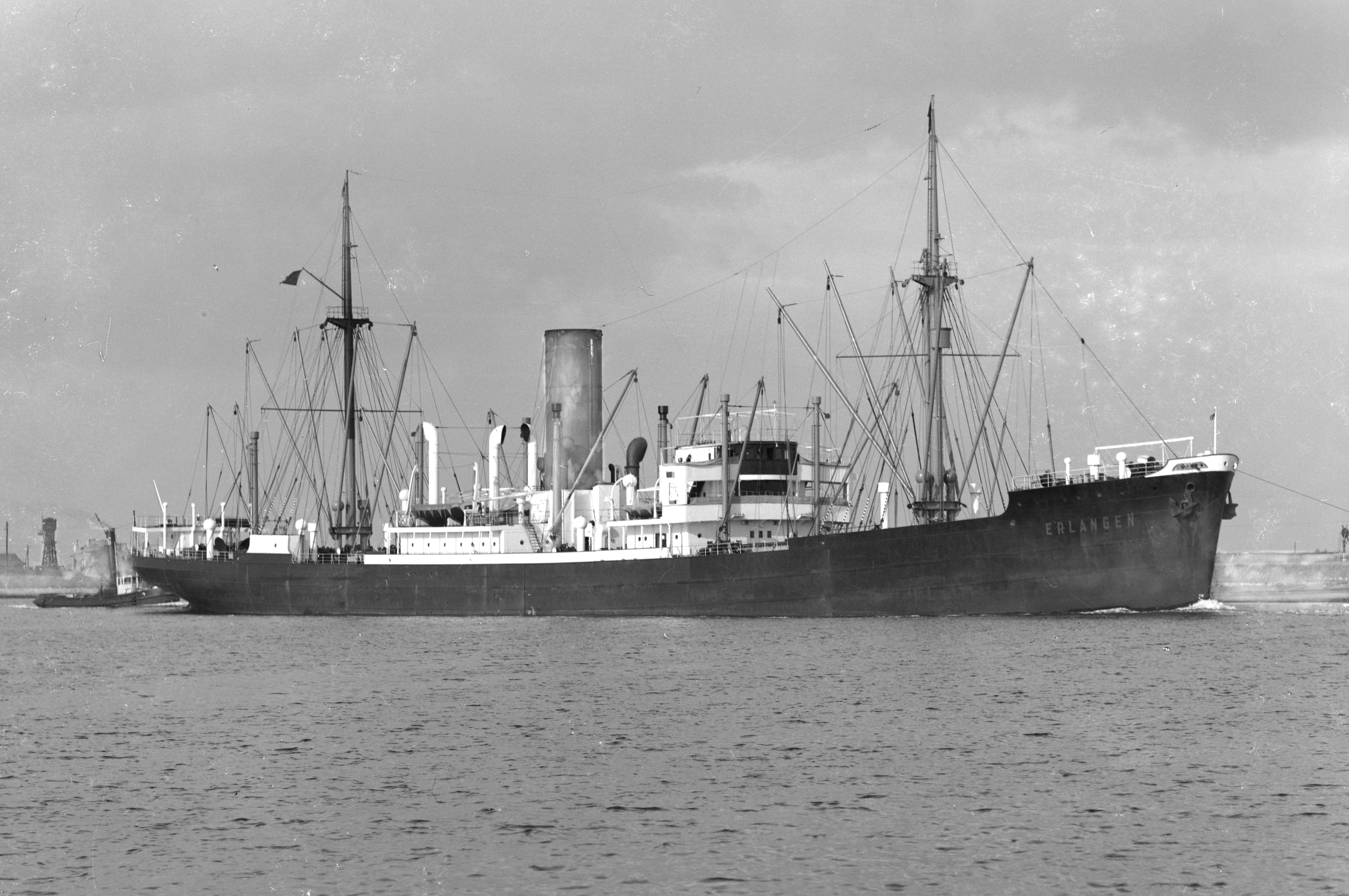
- Erlangen arriving at Antwerp

History

Germany
- Name: Erlangen
- Owner: Norddeutscher Lloyd
- Port of registry: Bremen
- Route: Bremen – Australia – New Zealand
- Builder: Blohm+Voss, Hamburg
- Yard number: 484
- Launched: 31 August 1929
- Completed: 2 November 1929
- Fate: Scuttled 25 July 1941

General characteristics
- Type: cargo ship
- Tonnage: 6,049 GRT, 3,613 NRT, 9,690 DWT
- Length: 449.6 ft (137.0 m)
- Beam: 57.6 ft (17.6 m)
- Depth: 26.8 ft (8.2 m)
- Decks: 2
- Installed power: 3,800 shp
- Propulsion: 1 × steam turbine; single-reduction gearing; 1 × screw
- Speed: 13 knots (24 km/h)
- Crew: 64
- Sensors & processing systems: as built: submarine signalling; by 1931: wireless direction finding; by 1937: echo sounding device
- Notes: sister ships: Frankfurt, Chemnitz, Goslar

SS Erlangen was a German cargo vessel that was surprised in New Zealand at the beginning of the Second World War. It managed to escape and after a spectacular journey travelled to Chile, a neutral country. It then tried to reach Germany but it was scuttled by its own crew off the coast of Uruguay on 25 July 1941 to avoid being captured by the British light cruiser HMS Newcastle.

== Construction ==
The Erlangen was built by Blohm & Voss in Hamburg for North German Lloyd (NDL). She was given the construction number 484, and launched on 31 August 1929. Her maiden voyage took place on 2 November 1929. The vessel was a coal-fired steamship using a steam turbine with single reduction gearing and a single screw for propulsion. Her sister ship was the Goslar. Her registered length was 449.6 ft (137.0 m), her beam was 57.6 ft (17.6 m) and her depth was 26.8 ft (8.2 m). Her tonnages were 6,049 GRT, 3,613 NRT, and 9,690 DWT. Her turbine was rated at 3,800 shp and gave her a speed of 13 knots (24 km/h).

== In Dunedin – August 1939 ==
The Erlangen made multiple visits to New Zealand on the German trade route from the Gulf of Mexico. She arrived in Auckland on 1 August 1939, and then stopped at Wellington and Lyttelton before entering Otago Harbour at Dunedin on 24 August and berthing at Victoria Wharf. The vessel had a crew of 63 including Captain Alfred Grams, 12 German officers and assistants, and 50 Chinese seamen.

Early on 25 August 1939, the German coast radio station Norddeich Radio sent a telegram to over 2,400 German merchant ships warning them that war was imminent, and that they should stay away from normal shipping lanes. In subsequent messages, they were instructed to seek safety in friendly or neutral ports within 4 days. The vessel was low on fuel and had planned to take on more coal at Port Kembla in Australia.

On 26 August 1939, after receiving the radio messages, Erlangen cleared customs and left Dunedin at mid-day, declaring intentions to sail to Port Kembla and from there to New York. When it left Dunedin, Erlangen had 220 tonnes of coal, but had a daily consumption of around 45 tonnes. The nearest safe ports were, however, around 5,000 nautical miles away.

== At the Auckland Islands ==
The Captain decided to wait at a secluded anchorage that was as safe as possible from discovery and see how things developed in Europe. The Chinese crew agreed to stay on board after being told that they were in danger of becoming prisoners of war, and were assured that their wages would be paid until they reached their new port of arrival. The vessel steamed northwards along the coast during the day, but then after dark turned south and headed for the Auckland Islands. The Erlangen travelled at only half normal speed, to conserve their limited fuel. (Note: The distance from the Otago Peninsula south to the entrance to Carnley Harbour in the Auckland Islands is 665 km (359 nmi). If the vessel was making 6 knots, the voyage would take 60 hours) The vessel arrived off the entrance to Carnley Harbour in the early evening, and waited offshore overnight before entering the narrow channel. After the fog lifted, the Erlangen entered Carnley Harbour around midday the next day and anchored in the North Arm of the harbour in a location that was partly hidden by the Figure of Eight Island.

Over the next five weeks, the crew cut timber from the southern rātā forest, aiming to collect 400 tonnes of wood to fuel the vessel. The total area cleared of timber was around 2.7 ha (6.7 acres).

New Zealand authorities suspected that the Erlangen could be in the Auckland Islands, and sent the cruiser HMS Leander to search for Erlangen. However, severe weather prevented HMS Leander from entering Carnley Harbour and the Erlangen was not discovered.

During the time in Carnley Harbour, the crew fabricated sails using available canvas and tarpaulins from the ship's hatch covers. These sails were rigged to the masts and derricks to provide additional propulsion.

The area of southern rātā forest cleared by the Erlangen crew was found in 1941 during the establishment of the coastwatching operation known as the Cape Expedition. Two separate clearings were seen at the head of the North Arm of Carnley Harbour, one on a point between two streams, and the other to the east. This area of the harbour is now known as the Erlangen Clearing.

== The journey to Chile and sinking in Uruguay ==
On 7 October 1939, the Erlangen left her anchorage with only an additional 240 tonnes of wood fuel, with the aim of reaching Chile. On the journey, the ship travelled 1,507 nmi (2,791 km; 1,734 mi) under sails alone, and 3,319 nmi (6,147 km; 3,819 mi) under steam power. The vessel anchored off the port of Ancud in Chile on 11 December 1939. On 12 December, Erlangen anchored off Puerto Montt and hosted a reception on board. The story of the escape of the Erlangen was told on Berlin Radio on 17 December 1939. The Chinese crew were released and were free to return home.

The Erlangen has been described as "Germany’s most famous blockade-runner of WWII".

In July 1941 the Erlangen was pursued and fired upon by the Royal Navy cruiser HMS Newcastle off the Río de la Plata. The Erlangen crew set off charges on the vessel causing a fire, and it sank on 25 July in Uruguayan waters.

== In popular culture ==
The novel The Sea Chase, written by Andrew Geer and published in 1948 incorporates some aspects of the story of the escape of the Erlangen from New Zealand. The novel was later used as a basis for the script for the 1955 movie The Sea Chase.

== Works cited ==
- Watson, Bob (September 1994). "The Great Escape". New Zealand Company of Masters Mariners - Auckland Branch Newsletter.
