= Goslar (ship) =

Wreck of a World War 2 German cargo steamship in Paramaribo, Surinam

Coordinates: 5.81808°N 55.15900°W

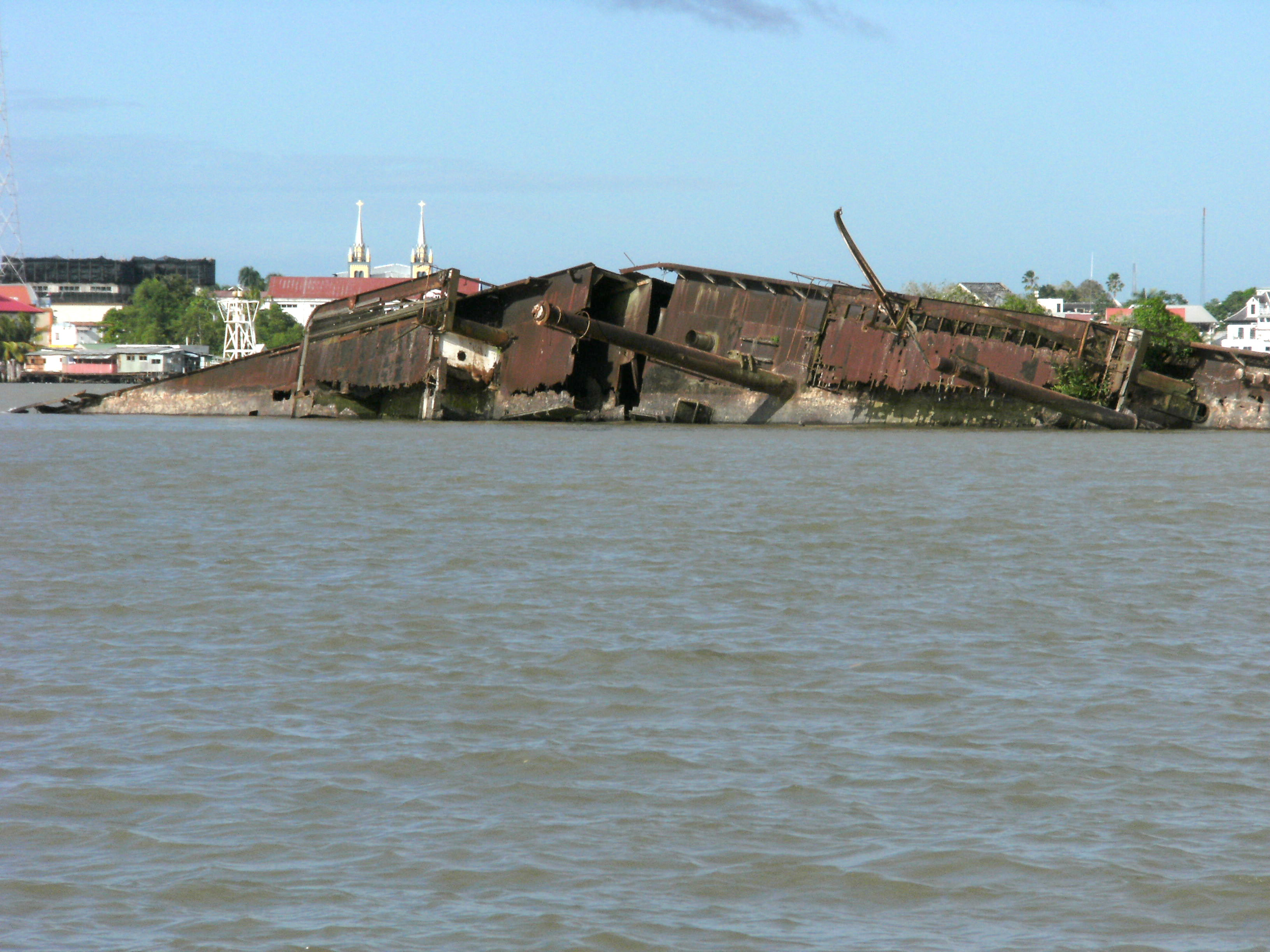
- Goslar's wreck in the Suriname River

History

Germany
- Name: Goslar
- Namesake: Goslar
- Owner: Norddeutscher Lloyd
- Port of registry: Bremen
- Route: Bremen – Australia – New Zealand
- Builder: Blohm+Voss, Hamburg
- Yard number: 485
- Launched: 3 October 1929
- Completed: 30 November 1929
- Identification: until 1933: code letters QMKL; by 1934: call sign DOBV
- Fate: Scuttled 10 May 1940

General characteristics
- Type: cargo ship
- Tonnage: 6,049 GRT, 3,613 NRT, 9,690 DWT
- Length: 449.6 ft (137.0 m)
- Beam: 57.6 ft (17.6 m)
- Depth: 26.8 ft (8.2 m)
- Decks: 2
- Installed power: 3,800 shp
- Propulsion: 1 × steam turbine; single-reduction gearing; 1 × screw
- Speed: 13 knots (24 km/h)
- Crew: 64
- Sensors & processing systems: as built: submarine signalling; by 1931: wireless direction finding; by 1937: echo sounding device
- Notes: sister ships: Frankfurt, Chemnitz, Erlangen

Goslar is a partly-submerged shipwreck in the Suriname River in Paramaribo, Suriname. It is the remains of a Norddeutscher Lloyd (NDL) steam turbine cargo ship that was built in 1929. When the Second World War began in 1939, she sought refuge in Suriname, which was then a Dutch colony. When Germany invaded the Netherlands in 1940, her crew scuttled her.

There have been attempts to salvage the wreck. In 1955 the wreck broke in two. Both parts of the wreck remain visible above water.

== Building ==
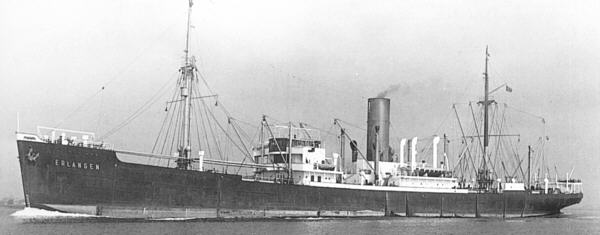
Goslar's sister ship Erlangen

In 1929 NDL took delivery of four new single-screw cargo steamships. Bremer Vulkan in Bremen built Frankfurt and Chemnitz, while Blohm+Voss in Hamburg built Erlangen and Goslar.

The Bremer Vulkan pair each had a three-cylinder triple-expansion engine as its main propulsion unit, augmented by an exhaust steam turbine. The Blohm+Voss pair were pure turbine ships, each propelled by a single turbine via single-reduction gearing. The Blohm+Voss pair were also 9 ft (3 m) longer, and slightly wider and deeper, than the Bremer Vulkan pair.

Blohm+Voss built Goslar as yard number 485. She was launched on 3 October 1929 and completed on 30 November. She was the last of the four sister ships to be completed. Her registered length was 449.6 ft (137.0 m), her beam was 57.6 ft (17.6 m) and her depth was 26.8 ft (8.2 m). Her tonnages were 6,049 GRT, 3,613 NRT, and 9,690 DWT. Her turbine was rated at 3,800 shp and gave her a speed of 13 knots (24 km/h).

NDL registered Goslar at Bremen. Her code letters were QMKL. In 1934 they were superseded by the call sign DOBV. As built, her navigation equipment included submarine signalling. Wireless direction finding was added by 1931, and an echo sounding device had been added by 1937.

== Refuge in Suriname ==
On 24 August 1939 Goslar left Philadelphia, Pennsylvania for Galveston, Texas. Three days later, NDL ordered her to make for a port in a country that was either neutral, or preferably friendly to Germany. Goslar's Master, Captain Karl Berghoff, considered making for Mexico, but the next day NDL ordered Goslar to head for Germany. Finally, on 29 August, NDL ordered Goslar to make for a neutral port, but not in North America. Berghoff feared that if she made for Mexico, Goslar might encounter a Royal Navy warship, so he set her course toward Brazil.

Finally, Berghoff changed course to Suriname, believing that there would not be war between Germany and the Netherlands. His crew disguised Goslar by painting her funnel and ventilators a different colour, changing her name, and replacing her German flag with a US one. At night she sailed with reduced lighting. In her engine room, preparations were made for rapid scuttling if necessary.

On 1 September Germany invaded Poland, and on 3 September France and the United Kingdom declared war on Germany. On 5 September Goslar entered the Suriname River, still disguised as a US ship. She took on a Surinamese pilot to take her to a safe anchorage in Paramaribo. He told her officers that they were very lucky, because a French warship had been anchored off the mouth of the river throughout the previous day.

Goslar had a crew of 15 German officers and men, and 49 Chinese seafarers. The Germans enjoyed the hospitality of German settlers in Suriname, including the German consul; and Dutch officials, including the harbour master of Paramaribo, N van Beek, who was also the police commissioner. However, the Chinese crew objected to remaining in port indefinitely. On 8 September then went on strike, and the next day Dutch colonial police arrested the strikers and removed them from the ship. A few days later the strikers agreed with Berghoff that they would continue to serve their contracts until the end of the year, after which they could either renew their contracts or return home. On that basis they were allowed back aboard ship.

In December 1939 the Italian ocean liner Orazio, which operated between Genoa and Curaçao, was diverted to pick up the Chinese members of the crew. On 22 December the newspaper De West reported that she would arrive off Suriname on 24 or 25 December. She was already carrying about 100 Chinese seafarers from German ships in other Caribbean ports. Orazio was too big to come up the Paramaribo, so she would anchor at the lightship, and a tender would take the Chinese out to her.

Orazio was to take the Chinese to Genoa, where they would be transferred to an Italian ship bound for Shanghai. One of Goslar's German engineer officers unsuccessfully tried to travel with them, disguised as a blind passenger. The 15 German members of Goslar's complement remained aboard as a skeleton crew.

== Scuttling ==
On the morning of 10 May 1940 Germany invaded the Netherlands. The Dutch Governor of Suriname, Johannes Kielstra, received notice of the invasion at 0114 hrs. He immediately ordered the internment of all German males over the age of 15, including Goslar's skeleton crew. At 0230 hrs van Beek boarded Goslar from a police boat with a boarding party of four soldiers and three police officers.

Berghoff met him on deck and declared "I have done my duty". Van Beek gave the Germans time to pack their belongings. At 0300 hrs van Beek heard metallic noises from below deck, followed by the sound of water entering the ship. He challenged Berghoff, who admitted that he was scuttling the ship on NDL orders. The police boat took the Germans ashore in two groups, returning to collect the second group at 0345 hrs.

Goslar was in water too shallow for her to sink entirely. She listed to port, and at 1330 hrs a team led by van Beek's marine advisor, Egger, began to try to pump water out of the ship. All watertight doors between her compartments were closed, but her list increased. By midnight her masts touched the water, and by 0430 hrs in 11 May she was lying on her port side.

On 21 May Kielstra reported to the Dutch Ministry of the Colonies, Charles Welter, that van Beek and his boarding party had failed to keep all Germans under supervision at all times. Van Beek had the advantage of boarding Goslar when her crew was asleep, yet one of the engineers had managed to activate the prepared scuttling arrangements unobserved. This instantly opened a hole at least 60 by 60 cm (2 by 2 ft) below the waterline. Van Beek was suspected of sympathising with Germany, so a Dutch government decree of 15 May temporarily suspended him from duty.

== Internment ==
At first the Dutch authorities interned German males, including those from Goslar, in Fort Zeelandia, which had been a prison. From there they were transferred briefly to a former hospital, and then permanently to a Roman Catholic boarding school about 16 kilometres (10 miles) outside Paramaribo, which was converted into Copieweg internment camp.

In August 1941 two of men from Goslar and a local German planter tried to escape from Copieweg. They were Chief Officer Anton Boyksen, engine room assistant Heinrich Scharfenberg, and a man called Schubert, who had owned the Beekhuizen plantation. They planned to go to French Guiana, which was under Vichy French control at the time. They stole a canoe, and on 7 September 1941 they reached the Marowijne River, which forms the border with French Guiana. However, a local resident called Soea saw them, gathered an armed group, and captured them.

== Salvage attempts ==
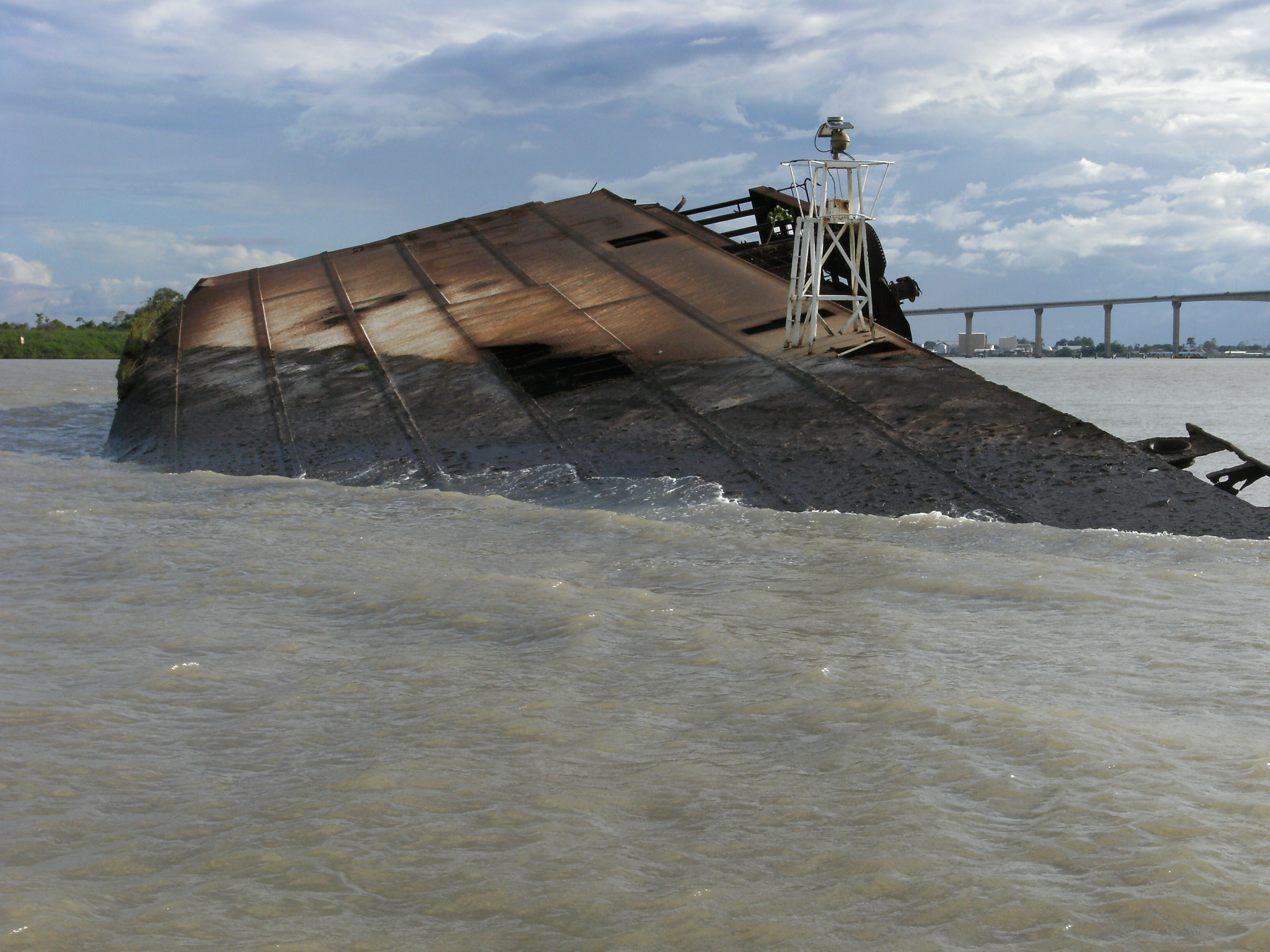
Part of the wreck, showing (centre right) a white-painted frame supporting a navigation light to help vessels to steer clear of it

On 9 October 1940 a prize court declared Goslar a prize of war. However, KNSM assessed that trying to raise and restore the ship would cost more than she was worth. Two other Dutch companies and a Canadian company each expressed an interest in salvaging her, but did not try to raise the wreck.

The UK Admiralty chartered a Merritt-Chapman & Scott salvage tug, the Panamanian-registered Killerig, to try to raise the wreck. Killerig reached Paramaribo on 5 January 1941, and spent more than two months trying to pump Goslar out. But she was unsuccessful, and she left on 21 March.

2017 news story about the 2016 plans, partly in English

Over the next few years, salvage companies based in Jamaica, Panama, the US, Curaçao and the Netherlands took an interest, but did not try to raise the wreck. By 1948, salvage experts considered that raising and restoring the wreck was uneconomic, and the only option was to scrap her. However, the cost of scrapping was estimated at 500,000 guilders, and the question of whether the Dutch government or the colonial government in Suriname would pay was unresolved. From then until the 1960s, Dutch and Surinamese contractors continued to show an interest from time to time, but none has either raised or demolished the wreck.

In 2016 Sediba NV offered to salvage the ship free of charge in order to make a two-hour documentary. However, the proposal was not implemented.

== Bibliography ==
- Captain, Esther; Jones, Guno (2010). "De interneringen in Suriname en de Nederlandse Antillen". Oorlogserfgoed overzee : de erfenis van de Tweede Wereldoorlog in Aruba, Curaçao, Indonesië en Suriname (in Dutch). Amsterdam: Bakker. ISBN 978-9035135840.
- Lloyd's Register of Shipping (PDF). Vol. II.–Steamers and Motorships of 300 tons gross and over. London: Lloyd's Register of Shipping. 1930 – via Southampton City Council.
- Lloyd's Register of Shipping (PDF). Vol. II.–Steamers and Motorships of 300 tons gross and over. London: Lloyd's Register of Shipping. 1931 – via Southampton City Council.
- Lloyd's Register of Shipping (PDF). Vol. II.–Steamers and Motorships of 300 tons gross and over. London: Lloyd's Register of Shipping. 1934 – via Southampton City Council.
- Lloyd's Register of Shipping (PDF). Vol. II.–Steamers and Motorships over 300 tons. London: Lloyd's Register of Shipping. 1937 – via Southampton City Council.
- Makdoembaks, Nizaar (2017). De Goslar-affaire (in Dutch). Zierikzee: De Woordenwinkel. ISBN 978-90-76286-28-0.
- Van der Horst, Liesbeth (2004). Wereldoorlog in de West: Suriname, de Nederlandse Antillen en Aruba, 1940–1945 (in Dutch). Hilversum: Verloren. ISBN 978-9065507945.
- Van Laar, E; Man A Hing, WL (2016) [1989]. "De roemloze ondergang van het stoomschip 'Goslar'". Caraïbisch Uitzicht (in Dutch). Werkgroep Caraibische Letteren.
- Media related to Goslar (ship, 1929) at Wikimedia Commons
