= Copieweg internment camp =

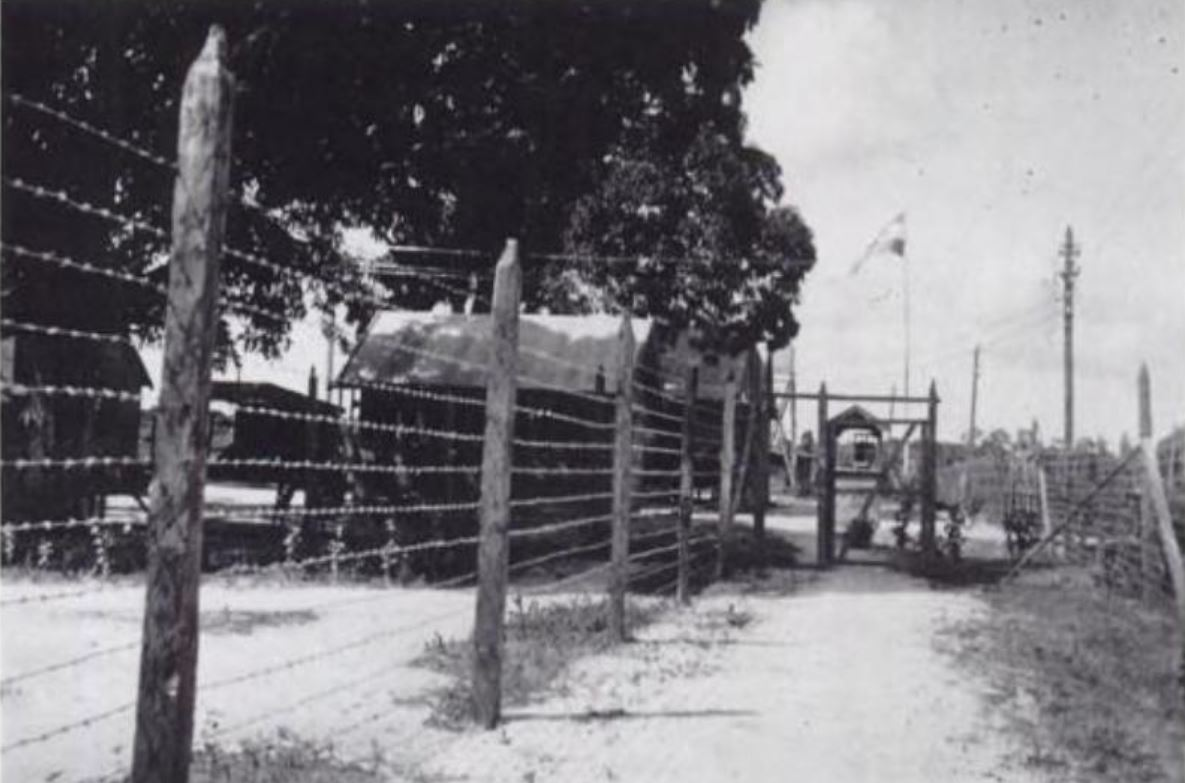
- A photo of Copieweg internment camp, 1940s

- Location within Suriname

General information
- Location: Noord, Para District, Suriname
- Coordinates: 5.66109°N 55.21987°W

Copieweg camp was a Dutch Internment Camp for German civilians that operated in Surinam during World War II, from 1940 to 1947. They were interned due to their nationality rather than due to proven support for Nazi Germany, although some of them were widely known to be Nazi supporters. Non-German detainees were also sent to this camp after 1942, including a small group of South African conscientious objectors and a few members of the Surinam political opposition including the politician Wim Bos Verschuur. The camp was built on the site of a Roman Catholic Monastery twenty kilometres from Paramaribo which was expanded to house a larger number of detainees.

== History ==
=== Establishment ===
Locations for internment camps in Surinam were planned as early as the start of World War II, in 1939. One of the sites selected was Copieweg, a Roman Catholic Monastery twenty kilometres from Paramaribo which contained a farm and a missionary school for Javanese students. It was added to the list of potential camp sites because it was not close to any industries which might be important to the war effort.

On May 10, 1940 the Netherlands was invaded by Nazi Germany and the Surinam government declared Martial law and imposed strict censorship. They detained German citizens who were in Surinam at the outbreak of the war, as well as Dutch citizens who were considered German sympathizers, such as members of the fascist NSB party. After the initial hasty detentions had been carried out, a more defined system of camps, military responsibility for prisoners, and separation of prisoners by categories was developed. Roughly 160 Germans (and a few others) were arrested in Surinam and roughly 440 in the Leeward Antilles, half of whom were German sailors. Some of them were initially detained at a series of camps on the island of Bonaire, while some German men were detained at Fort Zeelandia. In May 1940, the government confiscated the site of the Copieweg Monastery and its residents were relocated to another Catholic facility in Paramaribo. Twelve more barracks were built behind the Monastery later in 1940 to house future detainees; barbed wire and other building materials were shipped from the United States. More barracks were built during the duration of the war as extra camp sites were added to house distinct populations who were to be interned separately.

=== Active period (1940-47) ===
The first group of detainees to be moved into the camp were a group of about 70 German men who arrived before construction on the new barracks was completed; others were kept in a temporary camp at Beekhuizen until Copieweg was enlarged. A group of Javanese criminal prisoners who were not part of the detainee population were also sent to Copieweg to work; two of these escaped in August 1940.

The camp opened on a more official basis in June 1941, and 23 families were moved into the barracks. One estimate for the numbers of this group as including sixteen crew members of a German ship Goslar who were arrested in May 1940 as well around 122 German Christian missionaries living in Surinam. Some of the crew members of the Goslar managed to escape the camp within months of their arrival, including the captain Boisky. Another camp site, nicknamed the "Anti-Nazi camp", was also set up in 1941 to house left wing internees with Dutch citizenship.

The German prisoners at Copieweg were relatively well treated, especially compared to the prisoners in the Jodensavanne internment camp, who had been deported from the Dutch East Indies to Surinam and who were subjected to very rough treatment. The better treatment of Copieweg detainees may have been because authorities feared reprisals against Dutch citizens interned in camps in the German-occupied Netherlands, and also because of good relations between the German missionaries and the camp guards. A visit to the camp by a representative of the Red Cross in 1942 found the conditions to be relatively good but recommended improvements to the housing barracks and distributed clothing which had been brought from Germany.

In March 1942 another group of German detainees escaped, including once again some sailors from the Goslar as well as the former plantation owner of Beekhuizen, and tried to flee to French Guiana. They were quickly recaptured. In 1942 a second camp near the Copieweg site was built to house conscientious objectors from South Africa. These were a small subset of a larger group of 58 South African conscripts who had refused to serve were deported as a group to Surinam, and who were all interned for a time at Fort Zeelandia. Some of these agreed to enlist when faced with a trial in Surinam, but 16 or so who would not enlist were transported to a new barracks built near Copieweg.

Occasionally other figures were detained in the camp as well. Wim Bos Verschuur, a Surinam politician and writer, was arrested without charge for his public criticism of Governor General Johannes Kielstra, and was detained in the camp in August 1943. His detention caused a political scandal and led to an election and further arrests of opposition figures. Some communists and other figures critical of the Surinam administration were also interned during the war, leading to comments in the press that the powers of the Governor General to detain his opponents for any reason were too broad.

=== Aftermath ===
After the war ended in 1945, the German detainees in the camp were not allowed to leave immediately, as in the camp at Jodensavanne. Some authority figures wanted to deport all of them to Germany, whether or not they had non-German wives. However, there were not enough ships to transport them, and so at first 22 German men who had married Surinamese wives were released. Later, a handful of other Germans were allowed to be released to Surinam and 35 more were sent to Venezuela. There was talk of sending the remaining internees on a ship to Amsterdam in May 1946, but it did not happen. It was only in February 1947 that the remaining 80 German men, mostly missionaries, were released from the camp and expelled from Surinam and not permitted to return. These sailed to Amsterdam aboard the Bloemfontijn, which also picked up other former German detainees in the Antilles; most of these deportees eventually ended up in East Germany in the area under Soviet occupation.

After the camp was cleared out the land reverted to the Catholic Church, that reestablished a school and agricultural colony. At present the St. Ferdinandschool is located near the site of the former camp.
