= MS Orazio =

Italian ocean liner (1926–1940)

- Orazio in NGI livery, late 1920s

History

Italy
- Name: Orazio
- Namesake: Horace
- Owner: Navigazione Generale Italiana; Italian Line
- Port of registry: Genoa
- Builder: Cantieri e Officine Meridionali, Baia
- Launched: 31 October 1926
- Completed: October 1927
- Fate: Burned and sank off Toulon, 22 January 1940

General characteristics
- Tonnage: 11,669 GRT
- Length: 154.2 m (506 ft)
- Beam: 18.9 m (62 ft)
- Draft: 3.78 m (12.4 ft)
- Propulsion: Two Burmeister & Wain diesel engines; twin screw propellers
- Speed: 14 knots (26 km/h; 16 mph)
- Capacity: 110 (first class); 190 (second class); 340 (third class)
- Notes: Italy was neutral at the time of Orazio's sinking.

MS Orazio was an Italian ocean liner of the interwar period, owned by Navigazione Generale Italiana and later the Italian Line. She was destroyed by a fire off Toulon in January 1940, with the loss of 108 lives; in terms of loss of life this is the fourth greatest peacetime maritime disaster in Italian history, after those of Principessa Mafalda, Sirio, and Moby Prince. It was however quickly forgotten due to Italy entering World War II a few months later.

== History ==
Orazio was built in 1927 by Cantieri ed Officine Meridionali of Baia for Navigazione Generale Italiana of Genoa. She had a sistership, Virgilio; she was 506 feet long and 61 feet 9 inches wide, with a gross tonnage of 11,669 GRT. Two 6,600 BHP Burmeister & Wain diesel engines with two screws allowed a service speed of 14 knots. Accommodation was provided for 640 passengers (110 in first class, 190 in second class and 340 in third class), with a crew of 200.

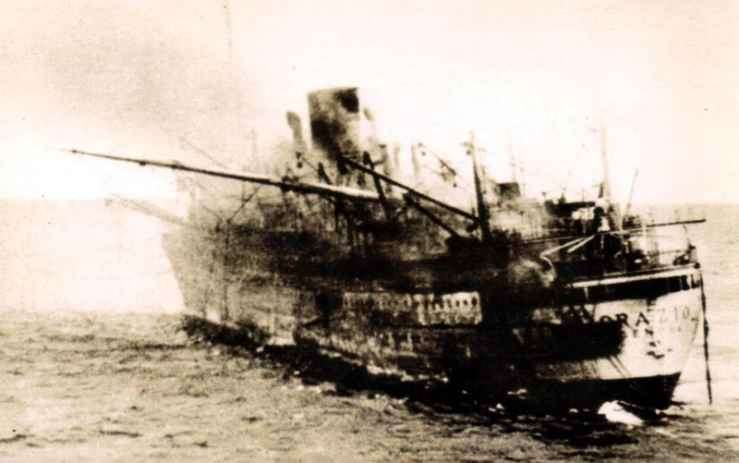
Orazio on fire

Along with Virgilio, Orazio was initially employed on the Italy-Central America line. After NGI was merged with other companies into the Italian Line in 1932, she was transferred to the Genoa-South America line.

While operating between Genoa and Curaçao, Orazio was diverted to Paramaribo, Suriname in order to pick up 49 Chinese sailors who were part of the crew of the interned German cargo ship Goslar. After an unsuccessful attempt of a German officer to board the ship, the Orazio sailed on, already carrying about 100 Chinese seafarers from other German ships who had sought shelter in Caribbean ports. From Genoa, they would be transferred to another Italian ship, bound for Shanghai.

On 21 January 1940, a few months after the outbreak of World War II but when Italy was still a neutral country, Orazio sailed from Genoa bound for Central America via Barcelona, carrying 645 passengers and crew, including a large number of Jewish refugees fleeing Europe. At 5:12 on 21 January an explosion in the engine room caused a fire which quickly spread throughout the ship. A number of rescue ships were soon on the scene, including the Italian liners Colombo and Conte Biancamano, the Italian motorship Cellina, the French destroyer Kersaint, the French auxiliary patrol vessel Ville d'Ajaccio and the French merchant ships Djebel Dira, Djebel Nador, Gouvernor General Cambon, Gouvernor General Grevy and Six Fours. Bad weather hampered the rescue efforts, but the rescue vessels were able to take off 537 passengers and crew; the captain, Michele Schiano, was the last to abandon the ship.

After all survivors had been taken off, Orazio sank during the night between 21 and 22 January, about forty miles southwest of Toulon. Forty-eight passengers and 60 crew lost their lives, either in the fire or in the initial attempts to abandon the ship, when at least one lifeboat fell into the sea killing its occupants.
