= Wim Bos Verschuur =

Surinamese politician, artist, and writer

Member of the Estates of Suriname
- In office 1942 – 30 July 1943
- In office 1945–1951
- In office 1955–1958

Personal details
- Born: Bernard Willem Hendrik Verschuur; 23 May 1904 Paramaribo, Surinam
- Died: 4 January 1985 (aged 80) Paramaribo, Suriname
- Occupation: politician, activist, artist, and writer

Wim Bos Verschuur (23 May 1904 – 4 January 1985), born Bernard Willem Hendrik Verschuur, was a Surinamese politician, activist, artist, and writer. On 30 July 1943, he was arrested and interned for opposing governor Johannes Kielstra; this caused a major scandal in Surinam politics and led to a larger wave of repression against opposition figures.

== Biography ==
Verschuur was born on 23 May 1904 in Paramaribo, across the street from the Palace of the Governor, as Bernard Willem Hendrik Verschuur. After finishing the MULO, Verschuur went to the Netherlands for an art teacher's degree. In 1933, Verschuur returned to Suriname, and became an art teacher.

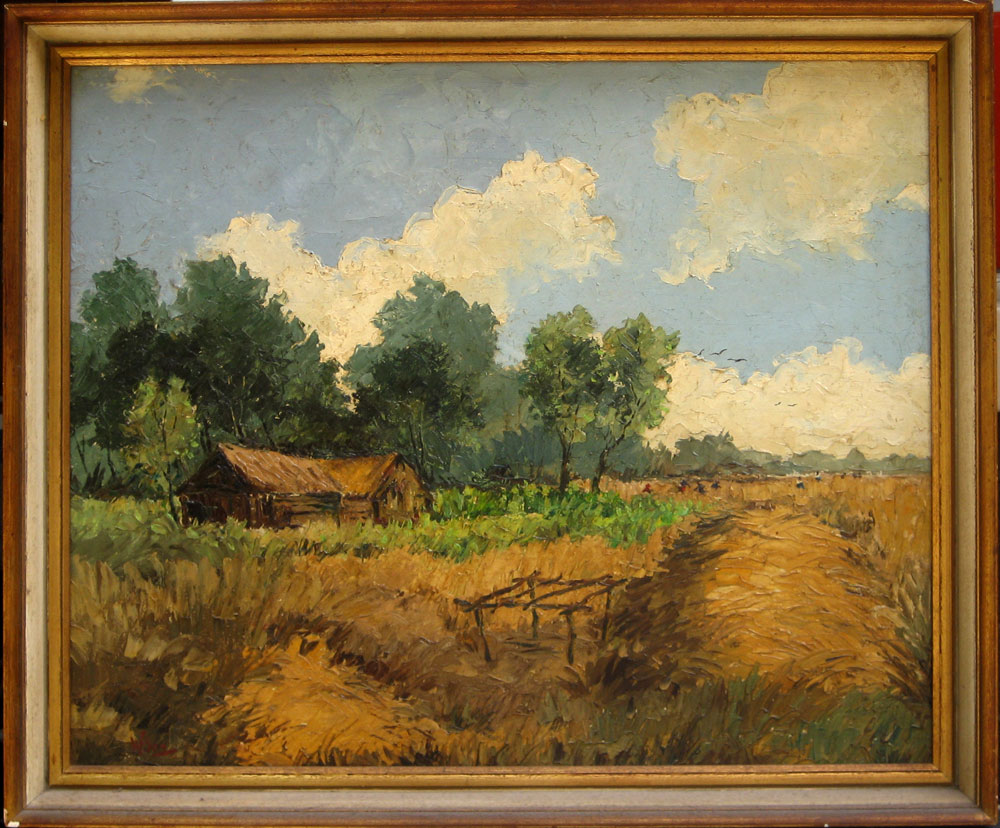
Painting by Verschuur

Verschuur became a chairman of the Surinaamse Arbeiders Federatie (Surinamese Workers Federation). In 1936, he wrote the play Woeker about the greed of the banks and credit unions. Verschuur was also politically active for home-rule in Suriname.

In 1942 he was elected to the Estates of Suriname. Governor Johannes Kielstra had used World War II to increase his power, and had received a mandate to circumvent the Estates. On 23 July 1943, Verschuur petitioned Queen Wilhelmina to remove Kielstra from office. On 30 July 1943, he was arrested and interned without trial, eventually ending up in the Copieweg internment camp which mostly held German and South Africans.

The arrest caused much indignation in Suriname. Further internments of political adversaries like Eddy Bruma and Otto Huiswoud followed. Seven members of the Estates resigned in protest thereby denying the quorum, and blocking any legislation to be passed. The magazine of the Moravian Church was shut down for speaking out against Kielstra, and the church was threatened with a denial of all subsidies. Finally, on 28 December 1943, the Dutch government-in-exile discharged Kielstra. Verschuur was released on 27 October 1944.

Verschuur was re-elected in 1946 and 1949 (as a representative of the National Party of Suriname) and served until the 1951 elections. In 1947 he was knighted in the Order of Orange-Nassau. In 1949 he was one of the founders of the Surinaams Museum. In 1952 he established the Suriname Party and in 1955 he was elected to the Estates with his party forming part of the Unity Front. He served in the Estates until 1958.

He published many magazines and pamphlets during his life. He wrote three books, but never published them. In 2017, Het vergeten land was published by the Surinaams Museum.

Verschuur died on 4 January 1985 at the age of 80.

== Bibliography ==
- Ferrier, Johan (1995). "De Unie Suriname". OSO. Tijdschrift voor Surinaamse taalkunde, letterkunde en geschiedenis (in Dutch).
