= Beekhuizen =

Beekhuizen Bekoysi (Sranan Tongo) Bekoisi (Caribbean Hindustani) Békoisi (Caribbean Javanese)
- Resort
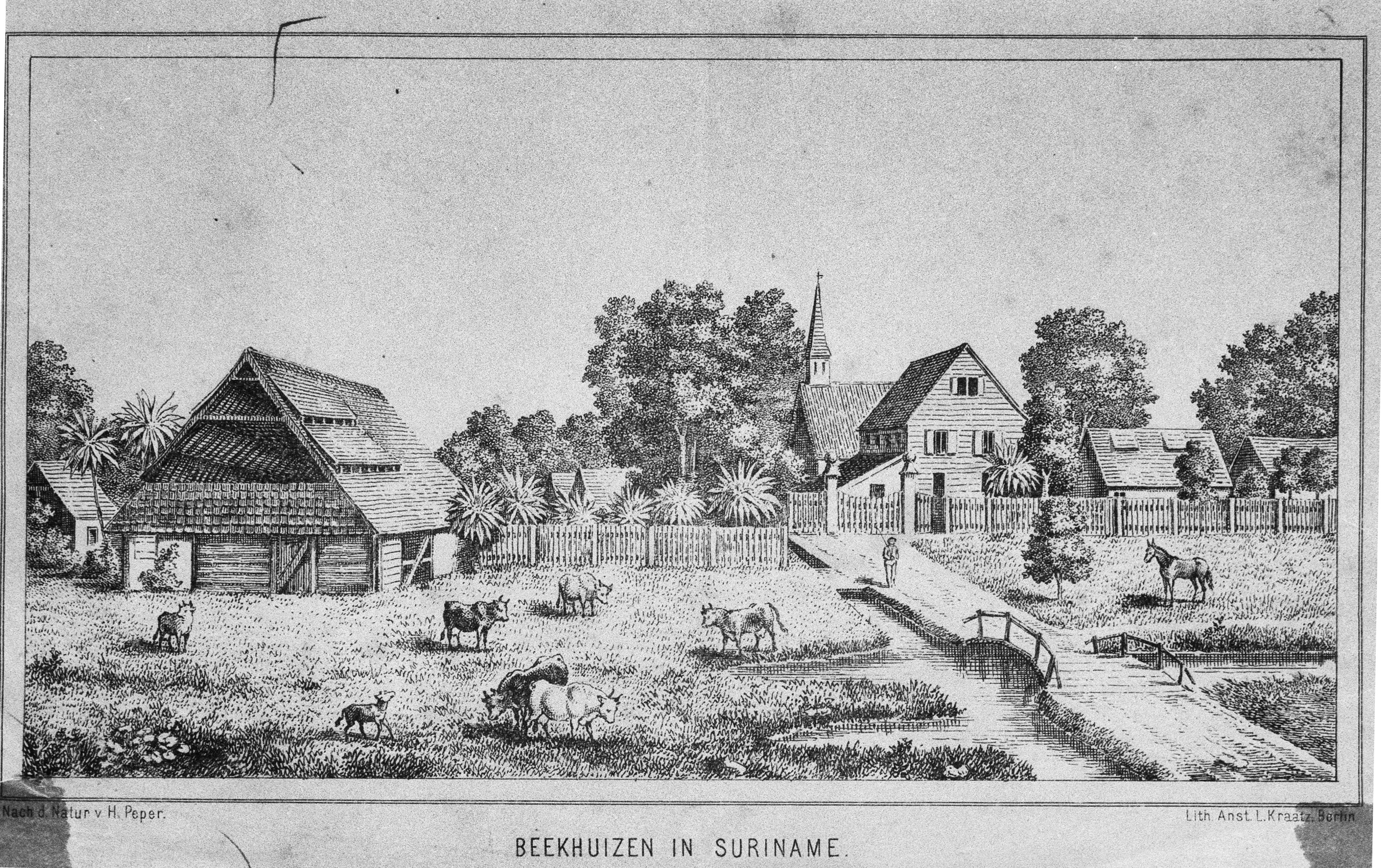
- The former Beekhuizen plantation

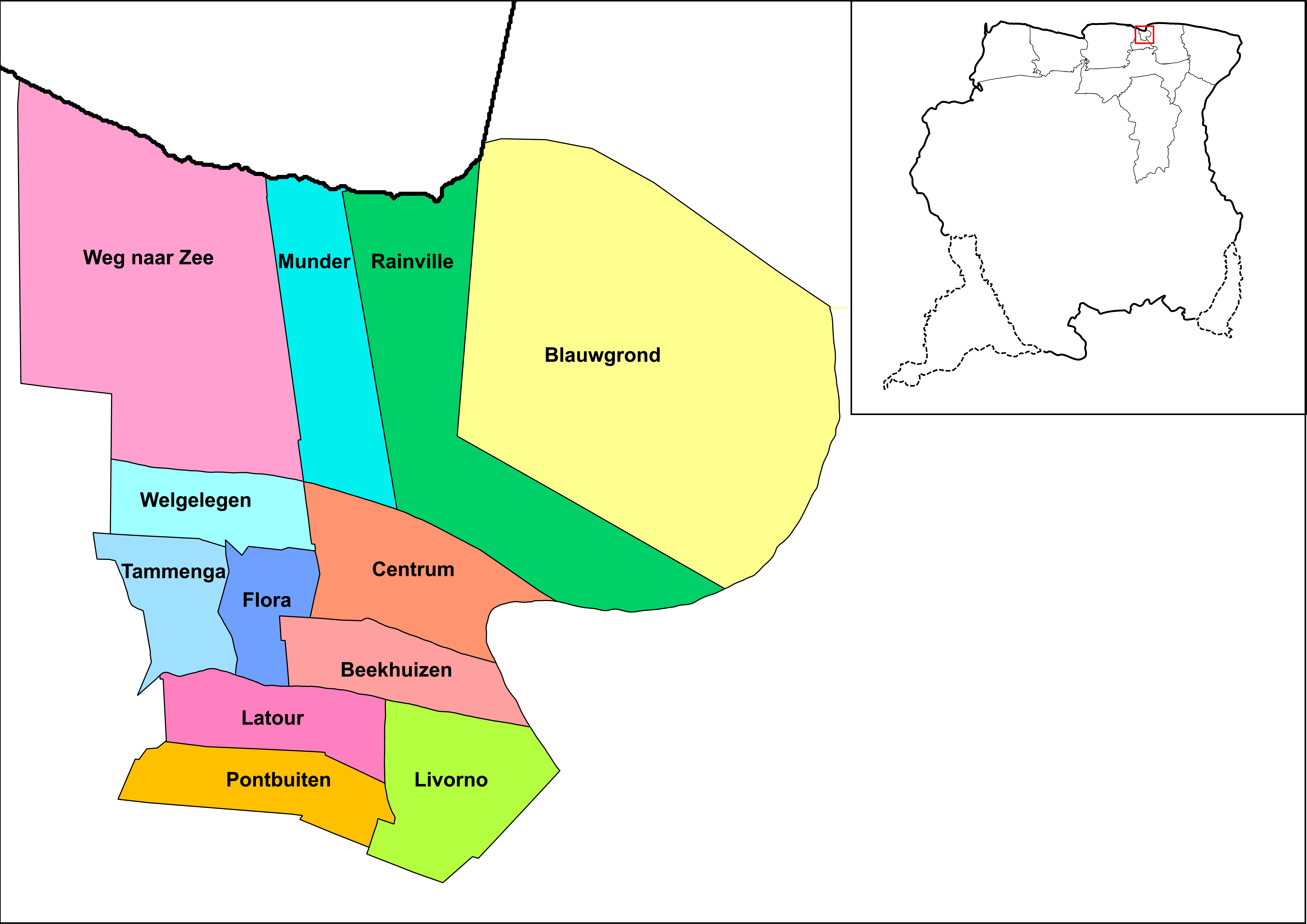
- Map showing the resorts of Paramaribo District. Beekhuizen
- Coordinates: 5.8055°N 55.1764°W
- Country: Suriname
- District: Paramaribo District

Area
  - Total: 9 km^{2} (3.5 sq mi)

Population (2012)
  - Total: 17,185
  - Density: 1,900/km^{2} (4,900/sq mi)
- Time zone: UTC-3 (AST)

Beekhuizen (Note: Sranan Tongo: Bekoysi, Caribbean Hindustani: Bekoisi, Caribbean Javanese: Békoisi) is a former sugarcane plantation and currently a resort in Suriname, located in the Paramaribo District. Its population at the 2012 census was 17,185.

The plantation was founded before 1700 by Benjamin Beeke. Around 1850, the Moravian Church became part owner of the plantation, started a school, and freed the slaves working on their part of the plantation, because they were against slavery. In the late 19th century, the Saramacca canal was widened, and 8,200 hectares could be put under cultivation.

At the outbreak of World War II, in May 1940, some Surinamese detainees were interned there, as well as some Germans on a temporary basis until the internment camp at Copieweg was completed. In 1947, Bruynzeel started a wood factory, and constructed wooden prefabricated houses on an industrial scale. In 1945, Beekhuizen became a neighbourhood of Paramaribo. The Zorg en Hoop Airport is located in the Beekhuizen resort. The Jules Sedney Harbour, one of the two main cargo harbours of Suriname (the other being in Nieuw-Nickerie), is also located in the resort.
