= HMS Newcastle (C76) =

Town-class cruiser

Coordinates: 65°48′N 25°19′W

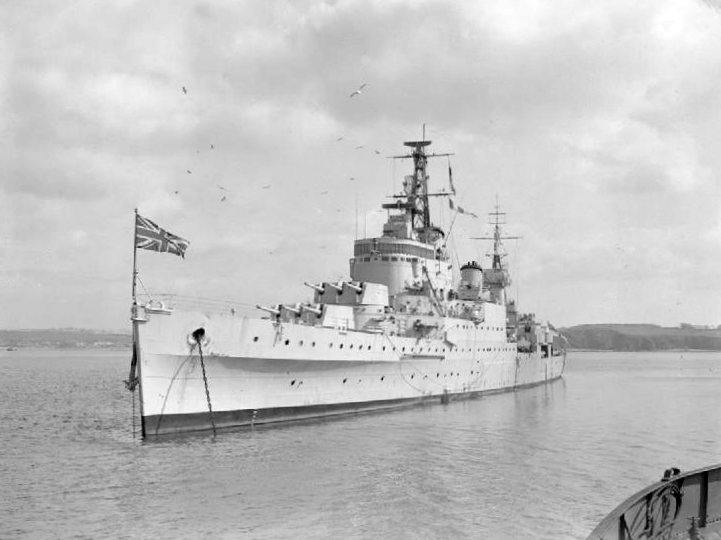
- HMS Newcastle at anchor in Plymouth Sound

History

United Kingdom
- Name: HMS Newcastle
- Namesake: Newcastle upon Tyne
- Builder: Vickers Armstrong
- Laid down: 4 October 1934
- Launched: 23 January 1936
- Commissioned: 5 March 1937
- Decommissioned: 1958
- Identification: Pennant number: C76
- Fate: Sold for scrapping August 1959

General characteristics
- Class & type: Town-class light cruiser
- Displacement: 9,100 tons standard; 11,350 tons full load
- Length: 591 ft (180 m) overall
- Beam: 61 ft 8 in (18.80 m)
- Draught: 21 ft 6 in (6.55 m)
- Propulsion: Four-shaft Parsons geared turbines; Four Admiralty 3-drum boilers; 75,000 shp
- Speed: 32 knots (59 km/h)
- Complement: 748
- Armament: Original Configuration: 12 × BL 6 inch Mk XXIII naval gun (152 mm) in triple turrets (one aft turret later removed for 8 × 40 mm Bofors guns); 8 × 4 in (102 mm) guns; 8 × 40.5 mm guns; 8 × 0.5 in (12.7 mm) machine-guns; 6 × 21 inch (533 mm) torpedo tubes (later removed)
- Aircraft carried: Two Supermarine Walrus aircraft (Removed in the latter part of WWII)

HMS Newcastle was a member of the Southampton subclass of the Town-class light cruiser of the Royal Navy.

== Construction ==
The first two Town-class were ordered from Vickers Armstrong and John Brown & Company on 1 June 1934 as part of the 1933 Construction Programme for the Royal Navy. Vickers laid down its ship, originally to be called Minotaur, at their High Walker shipyard on the River Tyne on 4 October 1934. The ship was renamed Newcastle later that year. Newcastle was launched, in a low-key ceremony owing to the death of King George V three days earlier, on 23 January 1936 by the Duchess of Northumberland. Sea trials, which were disrupted by bad weather, began on 30 November 1936 and continued until 11 December, with a speed of 32.3 kn (37.2 mph; 59.8 km/h) being reached during the eight-hour full power trial. Newcastle was accepted by the Royal Navy and commissioned on 5 March 1937.

== Interwar period ==
After commissioning, Newcastle joined the 2nd Cruiser Squadron, part of the Home Fleet. She took part in the Coronation Fleet Review at Spithead in 1937.

== Second World War ==
HMS Newcastle

Newcastle was under refit on the outbreak of war of the Second World War, joining the newly established 18th Cruiser Squadron on the refit's completion. Duties included trade protection duties in the Western Approaches and operation with the Northern Patrol in the waters between Scotland, Iceland and Greenland, enforcing the blockade of Germany by intercepting merchant ships suspected of carrying contraband to Germany.

On 25–26 September 1939, Newcastle sailed with the Home Fleet as it sortied to cover the 2nd Cruiser Squadron which was escorting the submarine Spearfish, which had been damaged by German trawlers, back to Britain. The covering force came under attack by German bombers, with the battleship Hood hit by a bomb that failed to explode, while air attack against the cruisers of the 18th Cruiser Squadron proving ineffective. On 12 November 1939, Newcastle intercepted the German blockade runner Parana in the Denmark Strait. Parana's crew set the German merchant ship on fire before abandoning ship, and Newcastle scuttled Parana with gunfire the next day. On 23 November 1939, the German battleships Scharnhorst and Gneisenau, on a sortie into the North Atlantic, encountered and quickly sank the British armed merchant cruiser Rawalpindi of the Northern Patrol. Newcastle, the next ship to the west in the British patrol line, responded to Rawalpindi's contact report and attempted to come to Rawalpindi's aid, but when Newcastle was spotted by the two German battleships, they broke off attempts to rescue Rawalpindi's crew, and made off at high speed, behind a smoke screen, with Newcastle, not yet fitted with radar, soon losing sight of the German ships in a rain squall.

On 23 March 1940, Newcastle began a refit on the Tyne which continued until 3 June that year, thus missing the majority of the Norwegian campaign. From 7 July, she was detached to Plymouth to guard against a potential German invasion. On the night of 10/11 October 1940, Newcastle provided illumination with star shells while the battleship Revenge bombarded the French port of Cherbourg in an attempt to destroy shipping that could be used in a German invasion. On 17 October 1940, Newcastle set out from Plymouth with the cruiser Emerald and the destroyers Jackal, Jupiter, Kashmir, Kelvin and Kipling to investigate reports of German destroyers. Later that day, the British force encountered the German destroyers Hans Lody, Friedrich Ihn, Erich Steinbrinck and Karl Galster. The German destroyers turned back at full speed making for Brest, with the British force in pursuit. Newcastle launched her Walrus seaplane to direct the British force's fire, but while Hans Lody was hit twice and Erich Steinbrinck received splinter damage, the German force escaped to safety in Brest.

On 13 November 1940, Newcastle set out for the Mediterranean, carrying 200 RAF personnel and a cargo of aircraft spare parts for Malta, where she arrived on 19 November. Newcastle's next mission was Operation Collar, in which a convoy of merchant ships would be escorted westwards from Alexandria in Egypt to Malta, while more merchant ships would be escorted eastwards from Gibraltar to Malta and Egypt, with the opportunity taken to transfer warships, including Newcastle from the Mediterranean to the North Atlantic. On 27 November, the Italian Fleet attempted to intercept the British convoy, resulting in the inconclusive Battle of Cape Spartivento.

Newcastle was then ordered to the South Atlantic, taking part in an unsuccessful search for the German auxiliary cruiser Thor that month. Newcastle remained continually at sea from 10 December 1940 to 21 April 1941, a total of 133 days, with 109 days out of sight of land, a record for Royal Navy warships during the Second World War, before a brief refit at Simonstown, South Africa. In May that year, Newcastle returned to commerce protection duties in the South Atlantic, and on 18 May 1941, captured the Vichy French merchant ship Lieutenant Saint Loubert Bie south of Saint Helena. On 25 July, Newcastle intercepted the German blockade runner Erlangen off the mouth of the River Plate estuary, with Erlangen being scuttled by her crew. Newcastle continued duties in the South Atlantic until August, when she made passage to the United States for refit.

Newcastle was refitted at Boston from September to December 1941, and after returning to Britain on 29 December, was further modified at Devonport dockyard, including revisions to her radar outfit. In February 1942, Newcastle left to join the Eastern Fleet, becoming the flagship of the 4th Cruiser Squadron. In June 1942, Newcastle was loaned to the Mediterranean Fleet to take part in Operation Vigorous, an attempt to run a convoy from Egypt to Malta at the same time as Operation Harpoon attempted to reach Malta from the West. The Vigorous convoy left Alexandria on 13 July, coming under air attack from 14 July. Early on 15 June, as a result of a sortie of the Italian Fleet, the convoy was ordered to temporarily turn to the east, and while this manoeuvre was underway, the German motor torpedo boat S-56 took advantage to attack the convoy, hitting Newcastle with a single torpedo. The torpedo blew a 15 ft × 20 ft (4.6 m × 6.1 m) hole on the starboard side of Newcastle's bow. While the cruiser's speed was temporarily reduced to 6 kn (6.9 mph; 11 km/h), damage control was successful, and Newcastle soon was able to increase speed to 12 kn (14 mph; 22 km/h), allowing her to keep up with the convoy, while she reached 20 kn (23 mph; 37 km/h) later that day when avoiding the torpedo attack that sank the destroyer Hasty. Newcastle's armament was undamaged, and she claimed a share in shooting down four enemy aircraft before the convoy returned to Alexandria on 16 June.

It was decided to repair Newcastle at Simonstown, leaving Alexandria on 19 June, and calling in at Aden to reinforce the ship's temporary repairs. On 27 June, Newcastle encountered heavy weather while crossing the Indian Ocean, with a hole being torn on the port side of the ship's bow of similar size to that on the starboard side, and badly damaging the internal structure in the damaged region of the ship. Newcastle returned to Aden for more shoring-up of the damaged areas, and underwent further temporary repairs at Bombay, with the holes in the bow being patched over and temporary decks being installed. Permanent repairs were carried out at Brooklyn Navy Yard, New York in October–November 1942, followed by further modifications at Devonport until March 1943.

After work up at Scapa Flow, Newcastle left to rejoin the Eastern Fleet on 15 April 1943, arriving at Kilindini Harbour in Kenya on 27 May, where she resumed her role as the flagship of the 4th Cruiser Squadron. Newcastle continued to be employed on commerce protection duties, as well being employed in attempting to intercept supply ships used for the replenishment of German U-boats. In late June 1943, Newcastle, together with the cruiser Suffolk and the destroyers Racehorse and Relentless, was deployed on Operation Player, a search for a U-boat supply ship believed to be operating in the Indian Ocean, but the search proved unsuccessful and was called off on 30 June. Newcastle was refitted at Simonstown from 26 August to 17 September 1943, with her anti-aircraft armament being strengthened. In February 1944, Newcastle, together with Relentless and Catalina flying boats, were deployed in a search for the U-boat supply ship Charlotte Schliemann based on intelligence from decrypted radio messages. The British ships found Charlotte Schliemann on the night of 11/12 February, and when Relentless opened fire, the supply ship's crew scuttled her. On 12 March 1944, Newcastle together with the escort carrier, Battler, the cruiser Sussex and the destroyers Roebuck and Quadrant, were sent to intercept the U-boat supply ship Brake, again in response to signals intelligence. Brake was spotted by aircraft from Battler, and Roebuck rushed to intercept, with Brake's crew scuttling the tanker.

From 16–24 April 1944, Newcastle took part in Operation Cockpit, an airstrike from the carriers Illustrious and USS Saratoga against Sabang, off Sumatra, with Newcastle forming part of the covering force and battleships and cruisers, and on 17 May, Newcastle took part in Operation Transom, another carrier strike by Illustrious and Saratoga, this time against Surabaya, Java. On 17 December 1944, Newcastle left Ceylon as part of the escort force for Operation Robson, a carrier strike by Illustrious and Indomitable against targets in Sumatra on 20 December, with the fleet returning to Ceylon on 22 December.

From early 1945, Newcastle began to be involved in direct support for the British Fourteenth Army in their campaigns in Burma. On 2 January 1945, Newcastle was deployed in support of landings on the north tip of Akyab Island, but the landings were unopposed as the Japanese had already evacuated Akyab. On 26 January, Newcastle, together with the cruisers Nigeria and Kenya and the destroyers Paladin and Rapid, landed Royal Marines on Cheduba Island. She also carried out shore bombardment duties during the Battle of Ramree Island. Newcastle returned to Britain for a refit on the Tyne in May 1945, and was still being refitted at the end of the war.

== Postwar ==
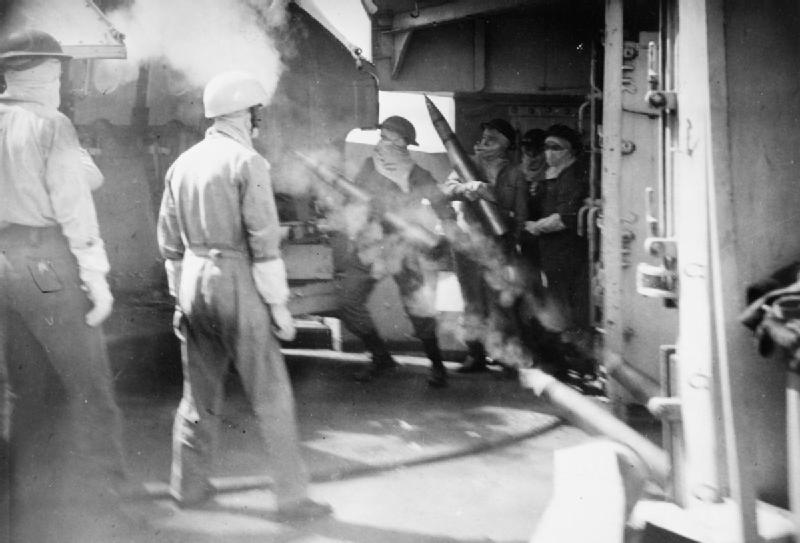
One of Newcastle's 4 inch guns in action against North Korean gun batteries

Newcastle completed the refit in October 1945, and was then used as a troopship carrying out trips to South Africa and Colombo, Ceylon before entering reserve at Devonport in February 1946. The ship was recommissioned late in 1947 to join the Mediterranean Fleet, with duties including acting as flagship, and supporting the interception of ships carrying Jewish refugees attempting to enter Palestine illegally. Newcastle returned to Britain at the end of 1949 and was decommissioned.

Work started on an extensive modernisation (officially classed as a 'Large Repair') at Devonport in May 1950, with the work completing in April 1952. Changes included a new bridge, revised sensors and fire control systems, and a new close-in anti-aircraft outfit of 18 40mm Bofors guns. In May 1952, Newcastle left British waters to serve in the Korean War, relieving the cruiser Ceylon on station off Korea on 4 July that year. Duties included patrols, carrier escort and providing naval gunfire support to UN forces.

Newcastle also served during the Malayan Emergency in the later 1950s, shelling Malayan Communist targets in June and August 1955 and again in December 1957.

== Decommissioning and disposal ==
Newcastle was decommissioned and sold for scrap in 1959, and subsequently broken up at Faslane.

== Bibliography ==
- Barnett, Correlli (2001). Engage the Enemy More Closely: The Royal Navy in the Second World War. Penguin. ISBN 0-141-39008-5.
- Blair, Clay (2000). Hitler's U-Boat War: The Hunted 1942–1945. New York: Modern Library. ISBN 0-679-64033-9.
- Campbell, N.J.M. (1980). "Great Britain". In Chesneau, Roger (ed.). Conway's All the World's Fighting Ships 1922–1946. New York: Mayflower Books. pp. 2–85. ISBN 0-8317-0303-2.
- Colledge, J. J.; Warlow, Ben (2006) [1969]. Ships of the Royal Navy: The Complete Record of All Fighting Ships of the Royal Navy from the 15th Century to the Present (3rd Rev ed.). London: Chatham Publishing. ISBN 978-1-86176-281-8. OCLC 67375475.
- Friedman, Norman (2010). British Cruisers: Two World Wars and After. Barnsley, UK: Seaforth Publishing. ISBN 978-1-59114-078-8.
- Haarr, Geirr H. (2013). The Gathering Storm: The Naval War in Northern Europe September 1939 – April 1940. Barnsley, UK: Seaforth Publishing. ISBN 978-1-84832-140-3.
- Hobbs, David (2017). The British Pacific Fleet: The Royal Navy's Most Powerful Strike Force. Barnsley, UK: Seaforth Publishing. ISBN 978-1-5267-0283-8.
- Koop, Gerhard; Schmolke, Klaus-Peter (2014). German Destroyers of World War II. Barnsley, UK: Seaforth Publishing. ISBN 978-1-84832-193-9.
- Lenton, H. T. (1998). British & Empire Warships of the Second World War. Annapolis, Maryland: Naval Institute Press. ISBN 1-55750-048-7.
- Lythall, Basil (1995). "Cecil Horton: Father of British Naval Radar". In Kingsley, F. A. (ed.). The Development of Radar Equipments for the Royal Navy 1935–45. Macmillan Press. ISBN 978-1-349-13459-5.
- McCart, Neil (2012). Town Class Cruisers. Liskeard, UK: Maritime Books. ISBN 978-1-904-45952-1.
- Raven, Alan; Roberts, John (1975). Ensign 5: Town Class Cruisers. Bivouac Books. ISBN 0-85680-008-2.
- Raven, Alan & Roberts, John (1980). British Cruisers of World War Two. Annapolis, Maryland: Naval Institute Press. ISBN 0-87021-922-7.
- Rohwer, Jürgen; Hümmelchen, Gerhard (1992). Chronology of the War at Sea 1939–1945. London: Greenhill Books. ISBN 1-85367-117-7.
- Rohwer, Jürgen (2005). Chronology of the War at Sea 1939–1945: The Naval History of World War Two (Third Revised ed.). Annapolis, Maryland: Naval Institute Press. ISBN 1-59114-119-2.
- Waters, Conrad (2019). British Town Class Cruisers: Design, Development & Performance; Southampton & Belfast Classes. Barnsley, UK: Seaforth Publishing. ISBN 978-1-5267-1885-3.
- Whitley, M. J. (1999). Cruisers of World War Two: An International Encyclopedia. London: Brockhampton Press. ISBN 1-86019-8740.
