= Naphtali Hirsch Goslar =

German rabbi and philosopher

Naphtali Hirsch ben Jacob Goslar (Hebrew: נפתלי הירש בן יעקב גאשלר, romanized: Naftali Hirš ben Yaʿaqov Goślar; fl. 18th century) was a German rabbi and philosopher.

Through his father, Jacob Goslar, he was a descendent of Rabbis Moses Isserles and Shabbatai HaKohen.

Initially serving as a dayyan in Halberstadt, he later relocated to Amsterdam, where he began the study of philosophy. In 1762, he published Merome sadeh, a collection of novellae on the Talmud, and Ma'amar efsharit ha-tiv'it, an apologetic work challenging the belief in primeval matter and natural religion.

== Publications ==
- Sefer Merome sadeh (in Hebrew). Amsterdam: Rofe & Koschman. 1762.
- Ma'amar efsharit ha-tiv'it (in Hebrew). Amsterdam: Rofe & Koschman. 1762.
