= De West =

De West is one of the main newspapers of Suriname.

De West was founded in 1892, and in its early years was a conservative paper that had a somewhat antagonistic rivalry with the left-leaning Suriname, the other leading newspaper in what was then the Dutch colony of Suriname. De West became a daily newspaper in 1950 owned and edited by David George Findlay.

On 25 February 1980, Dési Bouterse led a coup d'état. During the coup a hand grenade was thrown into the offices of De West, and the building was under fire; but the fighting caused only minor damage. The paper was forced to close in the early 1980s following a coup led by Dési Bouterse. It was allowed to reopen in 1984, although still under some government censorship. As of 2002, it was the second-largest paper by circulation in Suriname, after de Ware Tijd, and takes an independent political stance.
