= David George Findlay =

Surinamese politician, editor, and writer

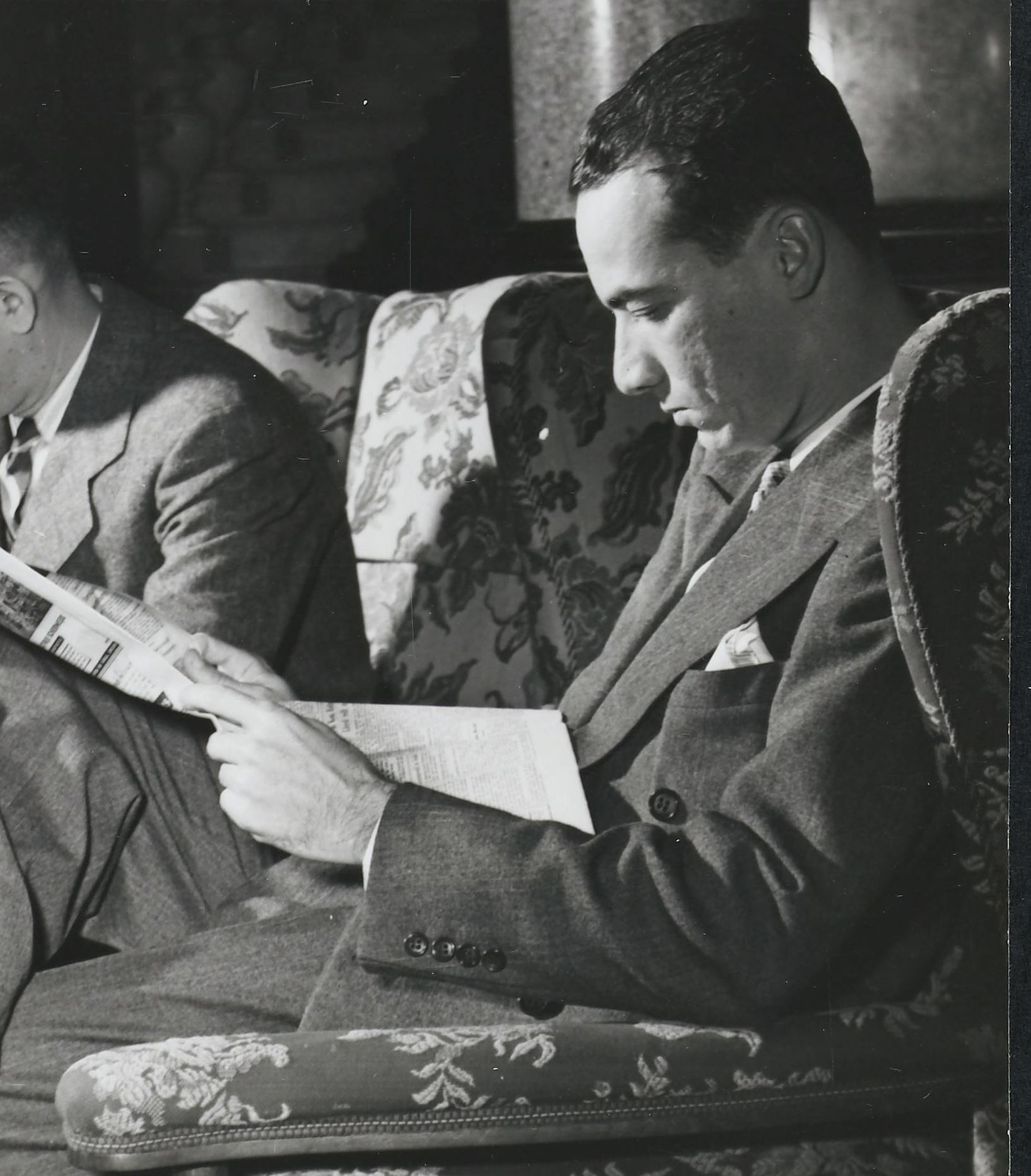
- David George Findlay (1948)

Member of the Estates of Suriname
- In office 1946 – 30 December 1954
- In office 10 May 1955 – 1958
- In office 1963–1969

Personal details
- Born: David George Albert Findlay; 27 March 1913 Paramaribo, Surinam
- Died: 6 April 1982 (aged 69) Paramaribo, Suriname
- Party: NPS (1946-1954); SDP (1955-1969)
- Occupation: politician, editor, and writer

David George Findlay (27 March 1913 – 6 April 1982) was a Surinamese politician, editor, and writer. He was the owner and chief editor of the newspaper De West.

== Biography ==
Findlay was born on 27 March 1913 in Paramaribo as David George Albert Findlay. He left for the Netherlands Antilles to work for Royal Dutch Shell, and later became a teacher at the MULO in Aruba.

William Kraan, owner of De West persuaded Findlay to return to Suriname, and become a newspaper editor. Findlay returned in September 1943. In 1947, Kraan retired, and Findlay bought the newspaper.

== Politics ==
Findlay was first elected to the Estates of Suriname in 1946. In 1950, Lou Lichtveld had fired doctor Henk van Ommeren over alleged irregularities which were later proven false. Findlay demanded the resignation of Lichtveld. The matter cumulated in the downfall of the government in 1951.

After a schism in the National Party of Suriname (NPS), Findlay left the NPS, and founded the Surinamese Democratic Party (SDP). In 1955, he was re-elected as part of the Unity Front. In 1958, the National Party of Suriname made a comeback, and Findlay had to wait until 1963 to be re-elected. In 1969, he retired from politics.

== Coup d'etat ==
On 25 February 1980, Dési Bouterse led a coup d'état to overthrow the government of Henck Arron. During the coup, a hand grenade was thrown into the offices of De West, and the building was under fire. Fortunately the fighting only caused minor damage, but it frightened Findlay. Later, the paper was forced to close.

== Death ==
Findlay died on 6 April 1982 in Paramaribo at the age of 69.

== Bibliography ==
- De geschiedenis van het bagno van Frans Guyana. Paramaribo: De West. 1970.
- Trio en Wayana indianen in Suriname. Paramaribo: De West. 1970.
- De ontdekking van een Akoerio vrouw met twee kinderen in het oerwoud van Zuid-Suriname. Paramaribo: De West. 1975.
