= Johannes Kielstra =

Dutch politician (1878–1951)

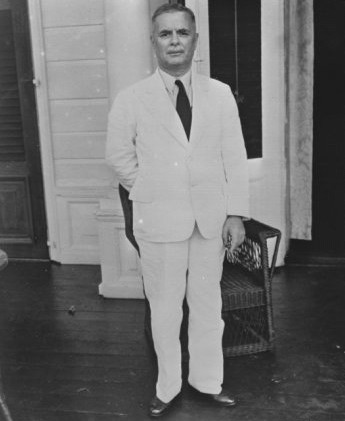

Governor-General of Suriname
- In office 16 August 1933 – 3 January 1944
- Preceded by: Bram Rutgers
- Succeeded by: Johannes Brons

Ambassador of the Netherlands to Mexico
- In office January 1944 – 1948

Personal details
- Born: Johannes Coenraad Kielstra; 13 November 1878 Zwartsluis, Netherlands
- Died: 1 April 1951 (aged 72) Monaco
- Party: National Union
- Occupation: Diplomat, professor

Johannes Coenraad Kielstra (13 November 1878 – 1 April 1951) was a Dutch professor and Governor of Suriname from 1933 until 1944. During World War II, he increased his authority and imprisoned political opponents causing the resignation of all elected members of the Estates of Suriname. On 28 December 1943, he was given an honourable discharge by the Dutch government-in-exile. He served as Ambassador of the Netherlands to Mexico from 1944 until 1948.

== Biography ==
Kielstra was born on 13 November 1878 in Zwartsluis, son of a Mennonite minister. In 1896, he studied law at Leiden University, and received his doctorate in 1901. In 1903, he moved to Indonesia, and worked at the Justice Department in Batavia (present-day Jakarta).

In 1918, Kielstra was appointed professor of colonial political science and economics at Wageningen University, and would remain professor until 1936. From 1922 until 1923, he was rector magnificus (president) of the university. In 1925, he travelled to the Dutch West Indies and visited Suriname which would become the main focus of his writings. In 1925, he was a co-founder of the National Union, a short-lived fascist party.

On 16 August 1933, Kielstra was appointed Governor-General of Suriname. He attempted to create autonomous village communities, and rejected assimilation of the different ethnic groups. In 1937, he proposed separate marriage laws for Hindus and Muslims. The Afro-Surinamese were opposed to the proposal, and it was rejected twice by the Estates of Suriname.

The German invasion of the Netherlands resulted in a declaration of a state of emergency in Suriname. Kielstra used the state of emergency to increase his power and circumvent the Estates. The marriage law was put in effect by decree in 1940. It was repealed in 1973.

Back in 1938, Kielstra had involuntarily committed Louis Doedel, a trade unionist, in a psychiatric hospital. He would use his increased authority against political opponents. Eddy Bruma and Otto Huiswoud were arrested and imprisoned without trial.

On 23 July 1943, Wim Bos Verschuur, a member of the Estates, petitioned Queen Wilhelmina to remove Kielstra from office. On 30 July 1943, he was arrested and interned without trial. Subsequently, all elected members of the Estates handed in their resignation. On 28 December 1943, he was given an honourable discharge by the Dutch government-in-exile.

In 1944, Kielstra was appointed Ambassador of the Netherlands to Mexico with an accreditation for Guatemala, and served until his retirement in 1948. He moved to Monaco, and died on 1 April 1951 at the age of 72.
