= List of political parties in Suriname =

This article lists political parties in Suriname. Suriname has a multi-party system with numerous political parties, in which no one party often has a chance of gaining power alone, and parties must work with each other to form coalition governments.

== Parties ==
| Party | Abbr. | Founded | Position | Ideology | Leader | National Assembly (seats won in the 2025 election) |
|---|---|---|---|---|---|---|
| National Democratic Party; Nationale Democratische Partij | NDP | 1987 | Left-wing | Left-wing nationalism; Left-wing populism | Jennifer Geerlings-Simons | 18 / 51 |
| Progressive Reform Party; Vooruitstrevende Hervormingspartij | VHP | 1949 | Centre to centre-left | Social democracy; Third Way | Chan Santokhi | 17 / 51 |
| General Liberation and Development Party; Algemene Bevrijdings- en Ontwikkelingspartij | ABOP | 1990 | Centre-left | Social democracy; Maroon interests | Ronnie Brunswijk | 6 / 51 |
| National Party of Suriname; Nationale Partij Suriname | NPS | 1946 | Centre-left | Social democracy | Gregory Rusland | 6 / 51 |
| Pertjajah Luhur; Vol vertrouwen | PL | 1998 | | Javanese Surinamese interests | Bronto Somohardjo | 2 / 51 |
| Alternative 2020; Alternatief 2020 | A20 | 2019 | Centre-right | Christian democracy | Steven Reyme | 1 / 51 |
| Brotherhood and Unity in Politics; Broederschap en Eenheid in de Politiek | BEP | 1973 | Centre-left | Social democracy; Maroon interests | Ronny Asabina | 1 / 51 |
| Reform and Renewal Movement; Hervormings- en Vernieuwingsbeweging | HVB | 2017 | | Javanese Surinamese interests | Mike Noersalim | 0 / 51 |
| Democracy and Development through Unity; Democratie en Ontwikkeling in Eenheid | DOE | 1999 | | Reformism | Steven Alfaisi | 0 / 51 |
| Surinamese Labour Party; Surinaamse Partij van de Arbeid | SPA | 1987 | Centre-left | Social democracy; Laborism | Joyce Amarello-Williams | 0 / 51 |
| Democratic Alternative '91; Democratisch Alternatief '91 | DA'91 | 1991 | Centre-right | Liberalism | Angelic del Castilho | 0 / 51 |
| Sustainable and Righteous Cohabitation; Duurzaam en Rechtvaardig Samenleven | DRS | 2014 | Centre-left | Social democracy; Laborism | Clifford Marica | 0 / 51 |
| Social Democratic Union; Sociaal Democratische Unie | SDU | 2019 | | | Celsius Waterberg | 0 / 51 |
| Progressive Workers' and Farmers' Union; Progressieve Arbeiders- en Landbouwersunie | PALU | 1977 | Far-left | Socialism; Marxism; Left-wing nationalism | Jim Hok | 0 / 51 |
| The New Lion; De Nieuwe Leeuw | DNL | 2012 | | | Dharm Mungra | 0 / 51 |
| National Development Party; Nationale Ontwikkelings Partij | NOP | | | | Melvin Clemens | 0 / 51 |
| Party for National Unity and Solidarity | KTPI | 1949 | | Javanese Surinamese interests | Iwan Ganga | 0 / 51 |
| New Style KTPI; Nieuwe Stijl KTPI | NSK | 2014 | | | Oesman Wangsabesari | 0 / 51 |
| The New Wind; De Nieuwe Wind | DNW | 2019 | | | | 0 / 51 |
| Political Wing of the FAL; Politieke Vleugel van de FAL | FAL | 1995 | Centre-left | Agrarianism; Social democracy | | 0 / 51 |
| Seeka | SEEKA | 2001 | | | Paul Abena | 0 / 51 |

== Former parties ==
- Basic Party for Renewal and Democracy (BVD)

== See also ==
- Politics of Suriname
- List of political parties by country
