= History of Suriname =

The early history of Suriname dates from 3000 BCE when Indigenous peoples first inhabited the area. The Dutch acquired Suriname from the English, and European settlement in any numbers dates from the 17th century, when it was a plantation colony utilising slavery for sugar cultivation. With abolition in the late 19th century, planters sought labour from China, Portugal (Madeira), the British Raj, and the Dutch colony Dutch East Indies (predominantly Java). Dutch is Suriname's official language. Owing to its diverse population, it has also developed a creole language, Sranan Tongo.

== Indigenous settlement ==
Suriname was populated millennia before the Europeans by many distinct Indigenous cultures. The largest nations at the time of colonisation were the Lokono, a nomadic coastal tribe that lived from hunting and fishing, and the Kalina (Caribs). The Kalina conquered the Lokono along much of the coast, and into the Caribbean, using sailing ships. They settled in Galibi (Kupali Yumï, meaning "tree of the forefathers") on the mouth of the Marowijne river. While the Lokono and Kalina lived off the coast and savanna, smaller groups of Indigenous peoples lived in the rainforest inland, such as the Akurio, Trió, Warrau, and Wayana.

== European colonisation ==
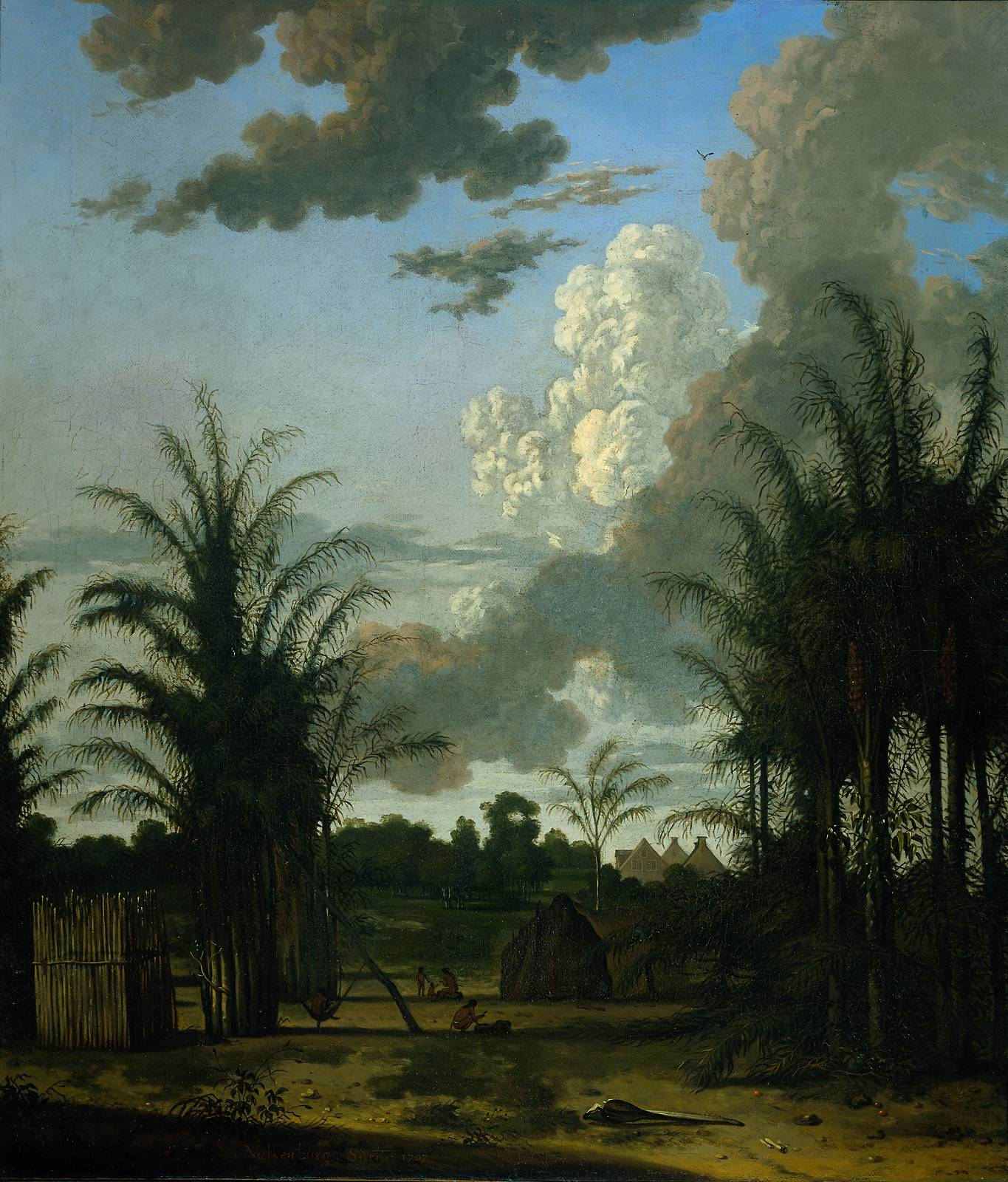
A plantation in Suriname by Dirk Valkenburg (1707?)

Plantations in Suriname around 1800.

=== Intermittent Settlement ===
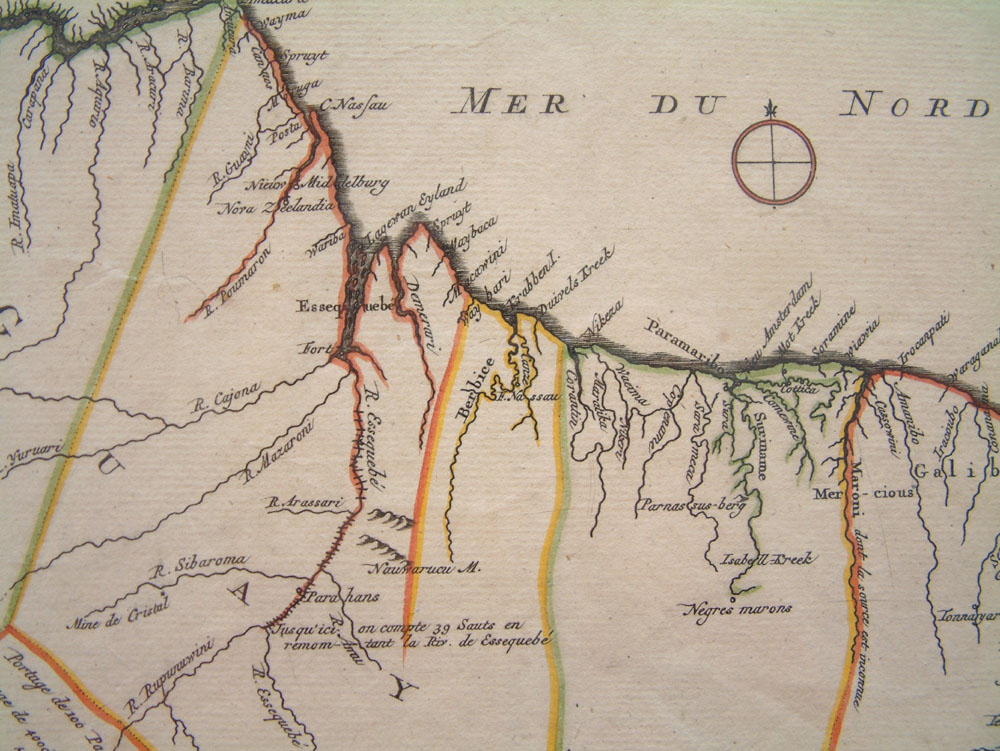
Coastline of the Guianas

The first Europeans who came to Suriname were Spanish explorers and Dutch traders who visited the area along with other parts of South America's 'Wild Coast.' In 1613, a Dutch trading post near the village "Parmurbo" was in existence on the Suriname River, while in the same year the Spanish took over another Dutch trading post on the Corantijn River. The first significant attempt to settle the area by Europeans was in 1630, when English settlers led by Captain Marshall attempted to found a colony. They cultivated crops of tobacco, but the venture failed financially. In 1640, perhaps while the English were still at Marshall's Creek, the French built an outpost near the mouth of the Suriname River.

=== English Colonisation ===
In 1650, Lord Willoughby, the governor of Barbados, furnished out a vessel to settle a colony in Suriname. At his own cost he equipped a ship of 20 guns, and two smaller vessels with things necessary for the support of the plantation. Major Anthony Rowse settled there in his name. Two years later, for the better settling of the colony, he went in person, fortified and furnished it with things requisite for defence and trade. The settlement consisted of around 30,000 acres (120 km^{2}) and "Fort Willoughby" near the mouth of the Suriname River, expanded from the abandoned French outpost. In 1663 most of the work on the 50 or so plantations was done by native Indians and 3,000 African slaves. There were around 1,000 whites there, joined by Brazilian Jews, attracted by religious freedom which was granted to all the settlers by the English.

=== Dutch colonisation ===
The settlement was invaded by seven Dutch ships (from the Zeeland region), led by Abraham Crijnssen on 26 February 1667. Fort Willoughby was captured the next day after a three-hour fight and renamed Fort Zeelandia. On 31 July 1667, the English and Dutch signed the Treaty of Breda, in which for the time being the status quo was respected: the Dutch could keep occupying Suriname and the English the formerly Dutch colony New Netherland (modern-day east coast of North America, with New Amsterdam as modern-day New York). This arrangement was made official in the Treaty of Westminster of 1674, after the English had regained and again lost Suriname in 1667. In 1674, Edward Cranfield led a commission which evacuated the English population. In 1683 the Society of Suriname was set up, modelled on the ideas of Jean-Baptiste Colbert to profit from the management and defence of the Dutch Republic's colony. It had three participants, with equal shares in the society's responsibilities and profits—the city of Amsterdam, the family Van Aerssen van Sommelsdijck, and the Dutch West India Company (WIC). The Van Aerssen family only managed to sell its share in 1770. The Society came to an end in 1795 when this kind of trade and business was no longer seen as acceptable.

=== Slavery and emancipation ===
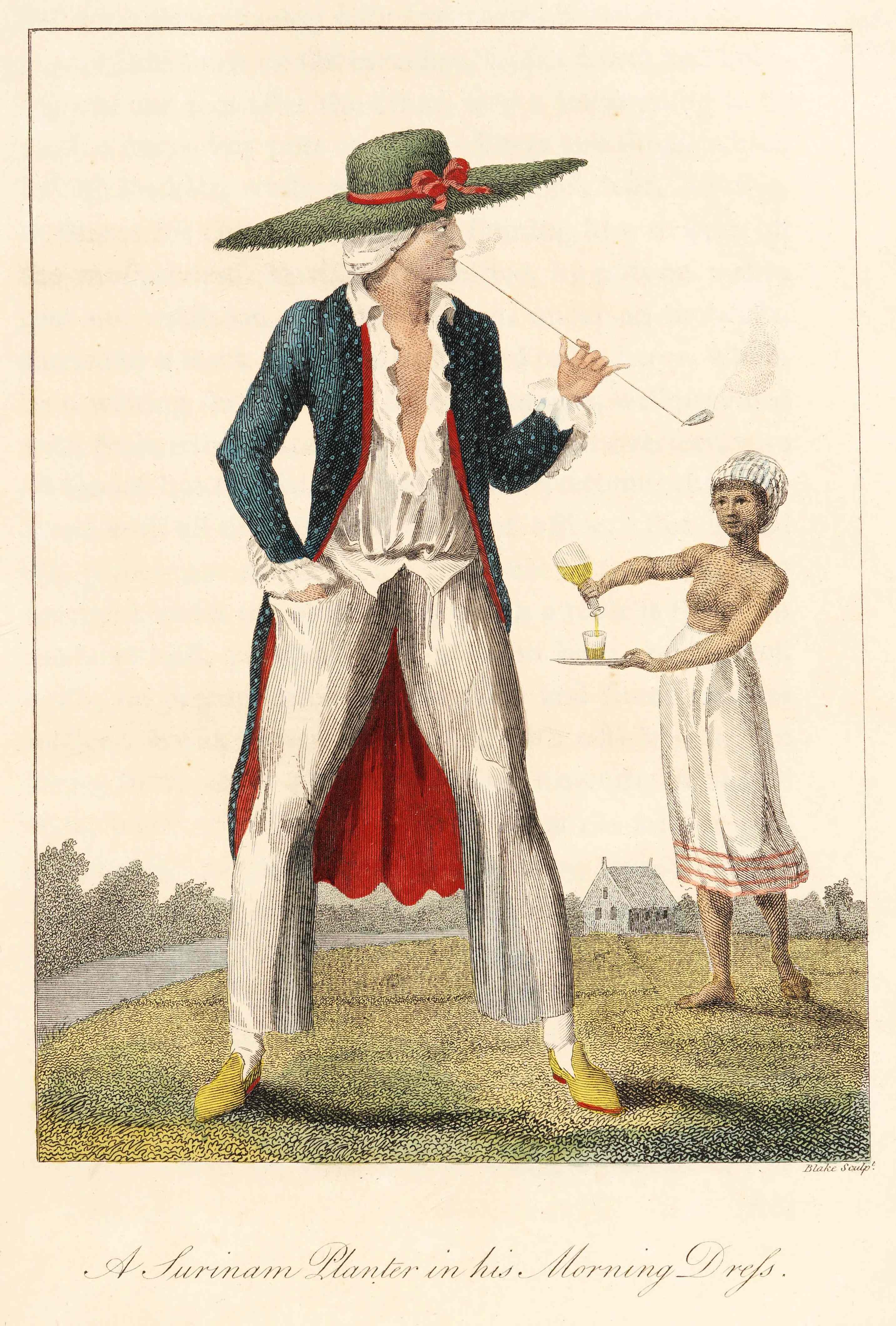
A Dutch plantation owner and female slave from William Blake's illustrations of the work of John Gabriel Stedman, published in 1792–1794.

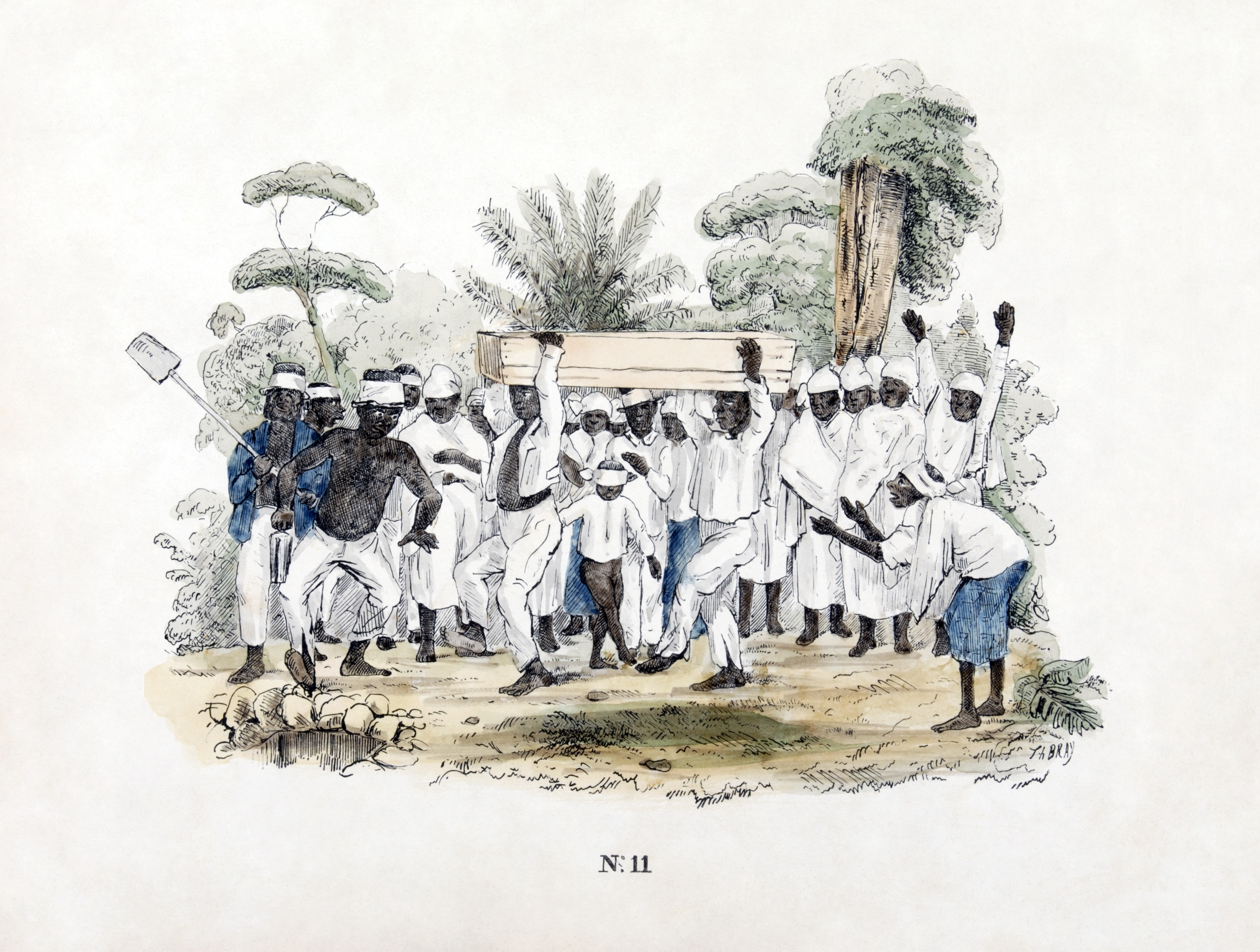
Funeral at slave plantation, Suriname. Colored lithograph printed circa 1840–1850, digitally restored.

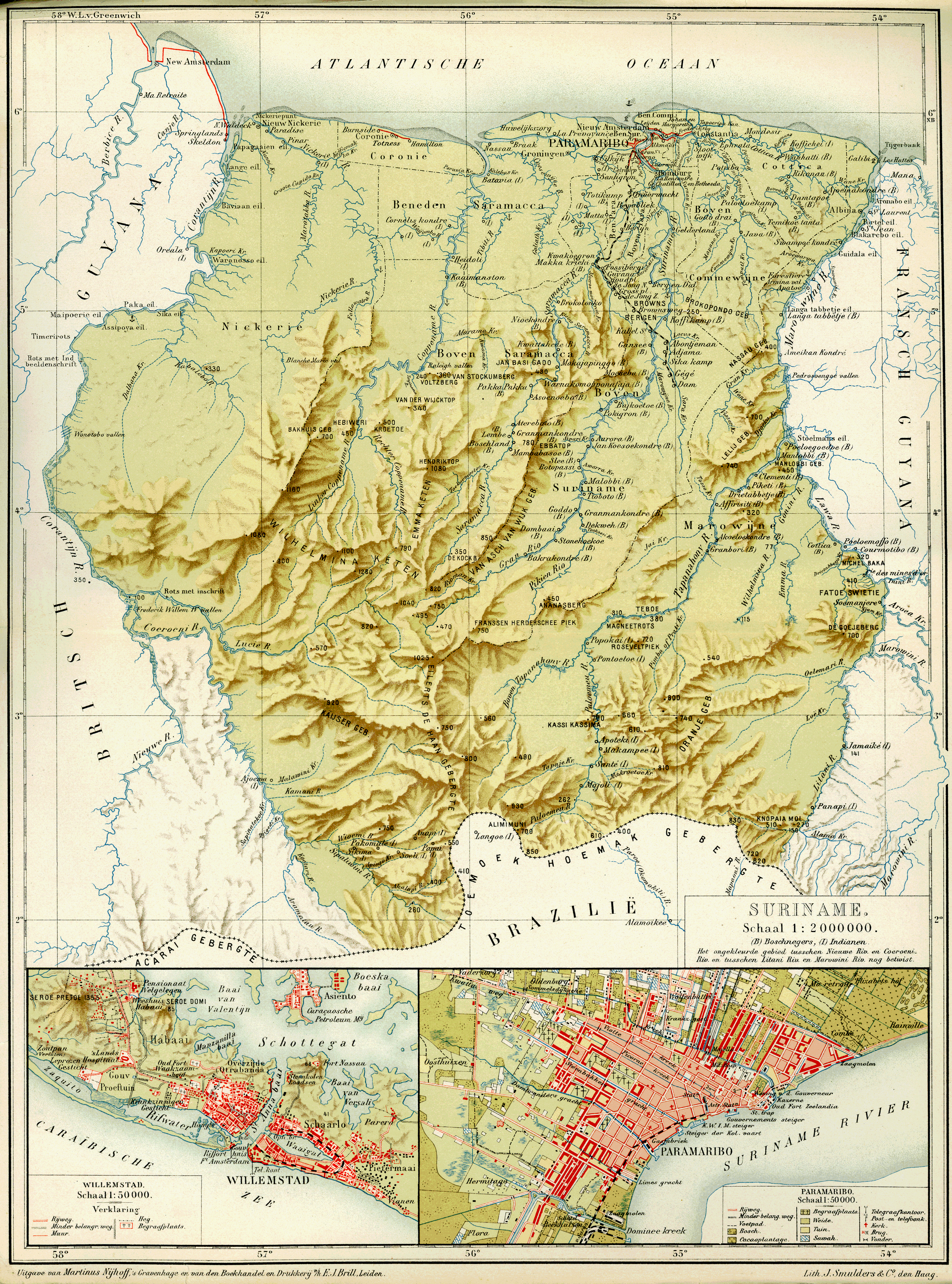
Suriname (circa 1914) in the Encyclopedia of the Dutch West Indies, by Surinamese cartographer Herman Benjamins and Dutch ethnographer Johannes Snelleman.

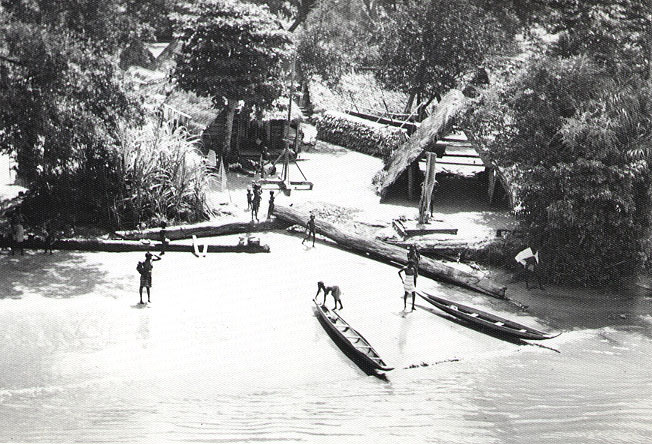
Maroon village, Suriname River, 1955

In South America, slavery was the norm. The native people proved to be in limited supply and consequently the Atlantic slave trade supplied the workforce for the plantations. The plantations were producing sugar, coffee, cocoa, and cotton which were exported for the Amsterdam market. In 1713, for instance, most of the work on the 200 plantations was done by 13,000 African slaves. Their treatment was horrific, and slaves periodically escaped to the jungle from the start. These Maroons (also known as "Djukas" or "Bakabusi Nengre") attacked the plantations in order to acquire goods that were in short supply and to free enslaved women. Notable leaders of the Surinam Maroons were Johannes Alabi, Boni, Joli-coeur, and Kapitein Broos (Captain Broos). In the 18th century, three of the Maroon people signed a peace treaty, similar to the peace treaty ending the First Maroon War in Jamaica, whereby they were recognised as free people and received a yearly tribute that provided them with the goods they used to "liberate" from the plantations. (Note: A contemporary description of the war between the Maroons and the plantation owners in Suriname can be found in Narrative of a Five Years Expedition Against the Revolted Negroes of Surinam by John Gabriel Stedman.)

Suriname was occupied by the British in 1799, after the Netherlands were incorporated by France, and was returned to the Dutch in 1816, after the defeat of Napoleon. In 1861–63, President Abraham Lincoln of the United States and his administration looked abroad for places to relocate freed slaves who wanted to leave the United States. It opened negotiations with the Dutch government regarding African-American emigration to and colonisation of the Dutch colony of Suriname in South America. Nothing came of it and after 1864, the proposal was dropped. The Dutch abolished slavery in their colonies only in 1863, although the British had already abolished it during their short rule. The freed slaves were, however, still required to continue their plantation work on a contract basis and were not released until 1873; up to that date they conducted obligatory but paid work at the plantations. Slaves were required to work on plantations for 10 transition years for minimal pay, which was considered as partial compensation for their masters. Besides that, the Dutch government in 1863 also compensated each slave-owner for the loss of the working force of each slave 300 Dutch guilders (equivalent to approx. €3,500 in 2021). After 1873, most freedmen largely abandoned the plantations where they had worked for several generations in favour of the capital city, Paramaribo.

In the meantime, many more workers had been imported from the Dutch East Indies, mostly Chinese inhabitants of that colony, creating a Chinese Surinamese population. From 1873 to 1916, many labourers were imported from India, creating the Indo-Surinamese. After 1916, many labourers were again imported from the Dutch East Indies (now Indonesia), especially Java, creating the Javanese Surinamese. These Asian workers were historically known as "coolies", which is nowadays generally considered a racial slur.

=== Twentieth century ===
In the 20th century, the natural resources of Suriname, rubber, gold and bauxite, were exploited. The US company Alcoa had a claim on a large area in Suriname where bauxite, from which aluminium can be made, was found. Given that the peace treaties with the Maroon people granted them title to the lands, there have been international court cases that negated the right of the Surinam government to grant these claims (meaning the right to take the land for themselves and ignoring autonomy).

On 23 November 1941, under an agreement with the Dutch government-in-exile, the United States stationed troops in Suriname to protect the bauxite mines.

== Decolonisation ==
In 1949, the first full election was held. Julius Caesar de Miranda was elected as first Prime Minister of Suriname. As a member of the Colonial States, he had been critical of Governor Kielstra and had argued for end to subservience to the Ministry of Colonies.

In 1954, Suriname gained self-government, with the Netherlands retaining control of defence and foreign affairs. It would become one of three member states - the others being the Netherlands Antilles and the Netherlands under one Kingdom.

== Independence ==
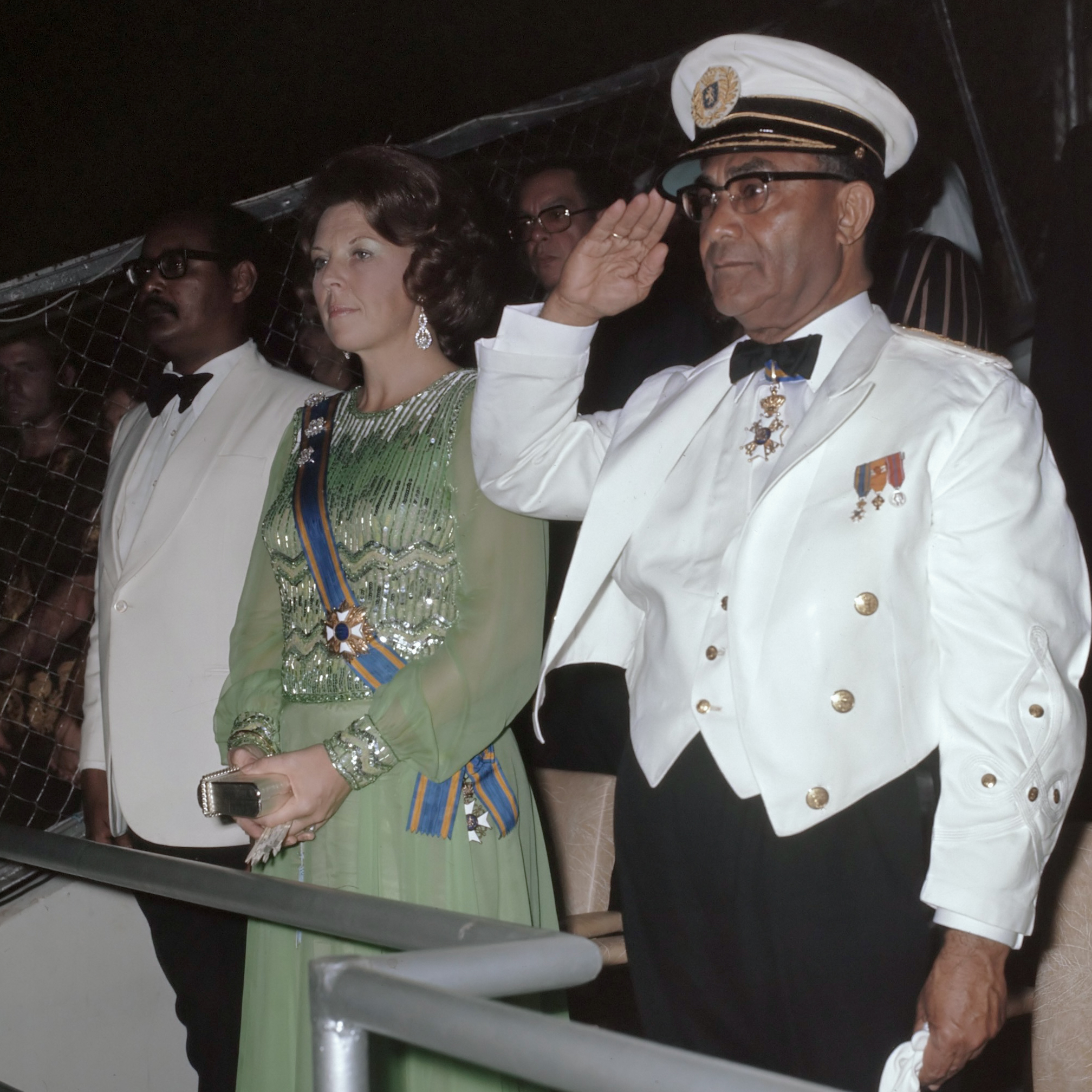
Henck Arron, Beatrix and Johan Ferrier on 25 November 1975

In 1973 the Dutch government started independence negotiations with the local government, led by the NPS (a largely Creole party), at the request of members of the NPS, which was granted on 25 November 1975. The Dutch instituted an aid programme worth US$1.5 billion to last till 1985. The first President of the country was Johan Ferrier, with Henck Arron (leader of the NPS) as Prime Minister. Despite agreements with the new Surinam government roughly a third of the population emigrated to the Netherlands prior to and after independence, fearing that the new country would not be viable. Also contrary to the agreements with the new Surinam government, many originally Dutch settlers (bakra's "whites"/boeroes "farmers") were expropriated by the new Surinam Government.

In 1980, the government of Henck Arron was overthrown in a military coup led by Sergeant-Major Dési Bouterse. President Ferrier refused to recognise the new government, appointing Henk Chin A Sen (of the Nationalist Republican Party; NRP). Another coup followed five months later, with the army replacing Ferrier with Chin A Sen. These developments were largely welcomed by a population that expected the new army-installed government to put an end to corruption and improve the standard of living. This was despite the fact that the new regime banned opposition parties and became increasingly dictatorial. The Dutch initially accepted the new government; however, relations between Suriname and the Netherlands collapsed when 15 members of the political opposition were killed by the army on 8 December 1982, in Fort Zeelandia. This event is also known as the Decembermoorden ('December murders'). The Netherlands and the US cut off their aid in protest at the move.

In 1985, the ban on opposition parties was lifted, and work began on devising a new constitution. The following year saw the start of an anti-government rebellion of the Maroons in the interior, calling themselves the Jungle Commando and led by Ronnie Brunswijk. The Bouterse government violently tried to suppress the insurgency by burning villages and other similar means. More than 10,000 Maroons fled to French Guiana, and were recognised refugees. The number of illegal refugees is unknown.

In 1987, Suriname got a new civilian constitution and next year Ramsewak Shankar was elected as president. He was ousted in a military coup organised by Bouterse in 1990. In 1991, opposition the New Front for Democracy and Development won majority in parliamentary elections. Ronald Venetiaan was elected as new president. The civil war ended after a peace agreement between the government of Suriname and the Surinamese Liberation Army (SLA), commonly known as the Jungle Commando (or Commandos), led by Ronnie Brunswijk, was reached in August 1992.

In 1992, an ally of Bouterse, Jules Wijdenbosch, was elected as new president. In 2000, Ronald Venetiaan became president again after winning the early elections. In 2005, Venetiaan was re-elected and his New Front coalition won narrowly the parliamentary election.

In July 2010, the parliament elected Bouterse as the new president. In 2015, his party National Democratic Party (NDP) narrowly won the parliamentary election, giving Bouterse a second five-year period in power.

In 2019, Bouterse was sentenced to 20 years in prison over the execution of 15 political opponents in 1982. Before, he was convicted in absentia of drug trafficking by a court in the Netherlands in 1999. Bouterse has denied any wrongdoing.

In 2020, the COVID-19 crisis began and oil prices fell. There was an economic crisis. On 25 May 2020, a general election took place. The Progressive Reform Party (PRP) got 20 seats (+11) out of 51 and the National Democratic Party (NDP) got 16 seats (-10). In July 2020, Chandrikapersad "Chan" Santokhi (PRP) was elected as the new President, replacing Bouterse. The PRP formed a coalition with the General Liberation and Development Party led by former guerilla leader Ronnie Brunswijk, the new vice president.

In February 2023, protests against rising living costs occurred in the capital Paramaribo. Protesters accused the government of President Chan Santokhi of corruption. They stormed the National Assembly, demanding that the government resign. However, the government condemned the protests. In December 2024, Desi Bouterse, Suriname's fugitive former president, died whilst in hiding.

On 6 July 2025, Jennifer Geerlings-Simons of the National Democratic Party (NDP) was elected as Suriname's first female president by the parliament.

== See also ==
- British colonisation of the Americas
- Dutch colonisation of the Americas
- French colonisation of the Americas
- History of the Americas
- History of South America
- History of the Caribbean
- List of colonial heads of Suriname (Netherlands Guiana)
- List of presidents of Suriname
- List of prime ministers of Suriname
- Politics of Suriname
- Spanish colonisation of the Americas
- 1999 Surinamese protests
