= Politics of Suriname =

Politics of Suriname take place in a framework of a representative democratic assembly independent presidential system, and in a multi-party system. Executive power is exercised by the government. The executive power is dependent on the Parliament in theory. Legislative power is vested in both the government and the National Assembly. The judiciary is independent of the executive and the legislature.

== Executive branch ==
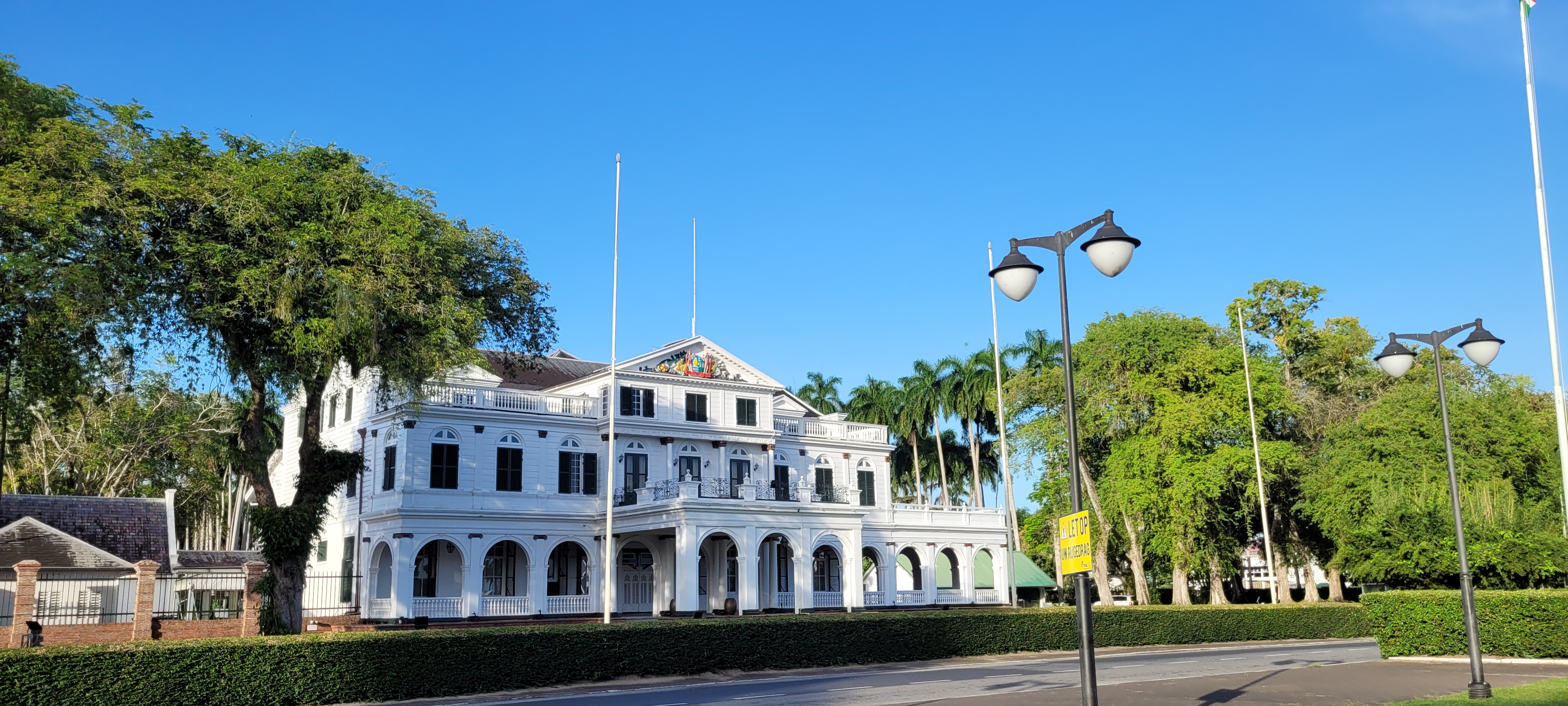
Presidential Palace of Suriname

The executive branch is headed by the president, who is elected by a two-thirds majority of the National Assembly or, failing that twice, by a majority of the People's Assembly for a 5-year term. If at least two-thirds of the National Assembly cannot agree to vote for one presidential candidate, a People's Assembly is formed from all National Assembly delegates and regional and municipal representatives who were elected by popular vote in the most recent national election. The Vice President, normally elected at the same time as the president, is elected for a 5-year term, the same way as the president. As head of government, the president appoints a cabinet of ministers who are led in their day-to-day activities by the Vice President. There is no constitutional provision for removal or replacement of the president unless he resigns.

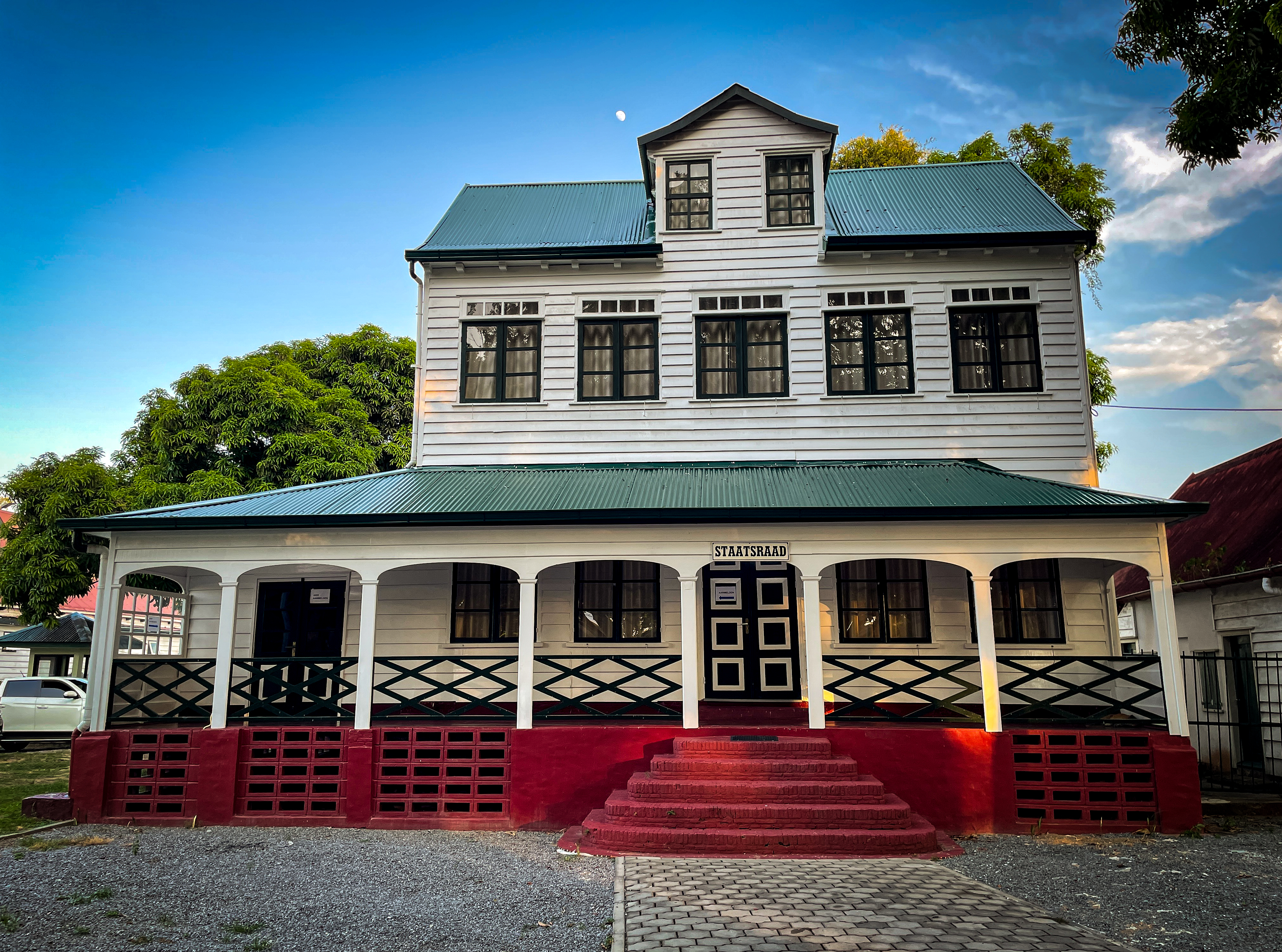
State Advisory Council of Suriname

A Staatsraad (State Advisory Council) with a maximum of 15 members, advises the president in the conduct of policy. All but four seats are allotted by proportional representation of all political parties represented in the National Assembly. The president chairs the council, and two seats are allotted to representatives of labor, and two are to employers' organizations. The Cabinet of Ministers appointed by the president.

== Legislative branch ==
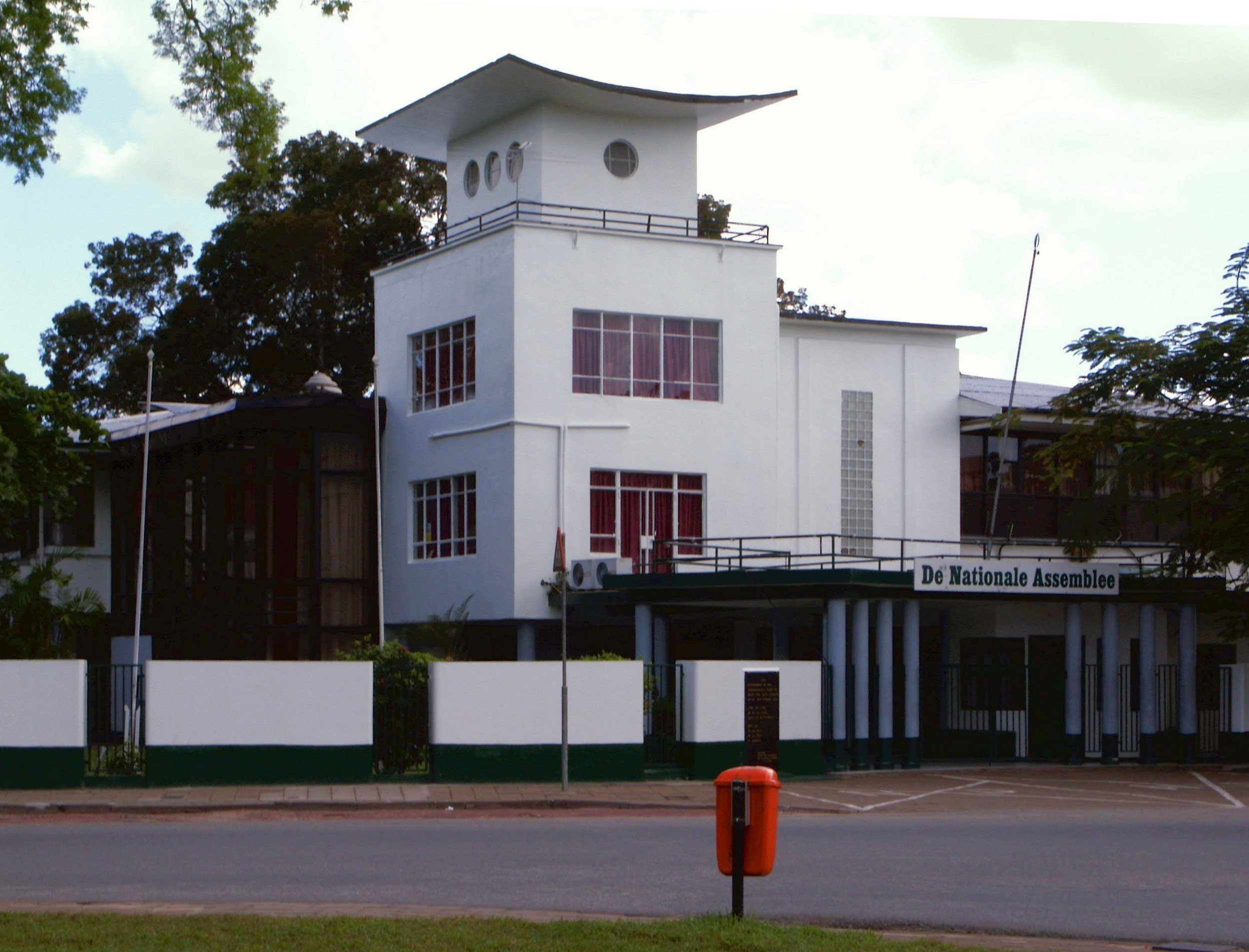
National Assembly of Suriname.

The legislative branch of government consists of a 51-member unicameral National Assembly, simultaneously and popularly elected for a 5-year term.

== Political parties and elections ==
Suriname elects on national level a head of state – the president – and a legislature. The president is elected for a five-year term by an electoral college based on the parliament. The National Assembly (Nationale Assemblée) has 51 members, elected every five years by proportional representation per district.

Party	Votes	%	Seats	+/–
Progressive Reform Party	108,378	39.45	20	+11
National Democratic Party	65,862	23.97	16	–10
National Party of Suriname	32,394	11.79	3	+1
General Liberation and Development Party (Note: ABOP member Miquella Soemar-Huur was elected as lijstduwer on PL's list in Wanica, and is included in PL's seat total.)	24,956	9.08	8	+3
Pertjajah Luhur	16,623	6.05	2	–3
Reform and Renewal Movement	7,423	2.70	0	New
Brotherhood and Unity in Politics	6,835	2.49	2	0
Alternative 2020	4,501	1.64	0	New
Democracy and Development through Unity	2,375	0.86	0	–1
Party for Law and Development–Amazon Party	1,593	0.58	0	0
Surinamese Labour Party	922	0.34	0	0
Progressive Workers' and Farmers' Union	820	0.30	0	–1
STREI!	700	0.25	0	New
Democratic Alternative '91	659	0.24	0	0
People's Party for Renewal and Democracy	349	0.13	0	0
Social Democratic Union	254	0.09	0	New
The New Wind	70	0.03	0	New
Total	274,714	100.00	51	0
Valid votes	274,714	96.79		
Invalid/blank votes	9,120	3.21		
Total votes	283,834	100.00		
Registered voters/turnout	383,333	74.04		
Source: Centraal Hoofdstembureau

== Judicial branch ==
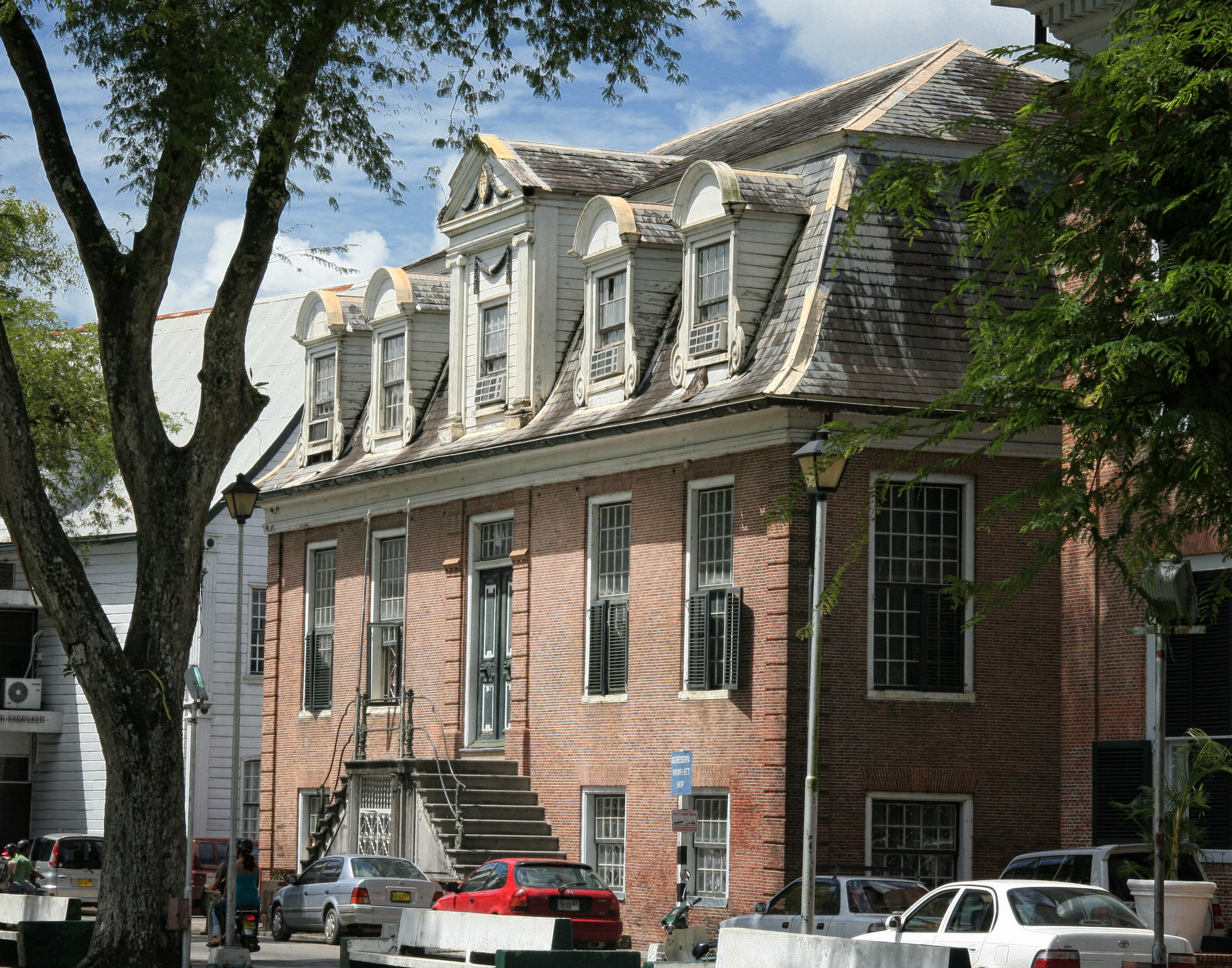
Court of Justice of Suriname

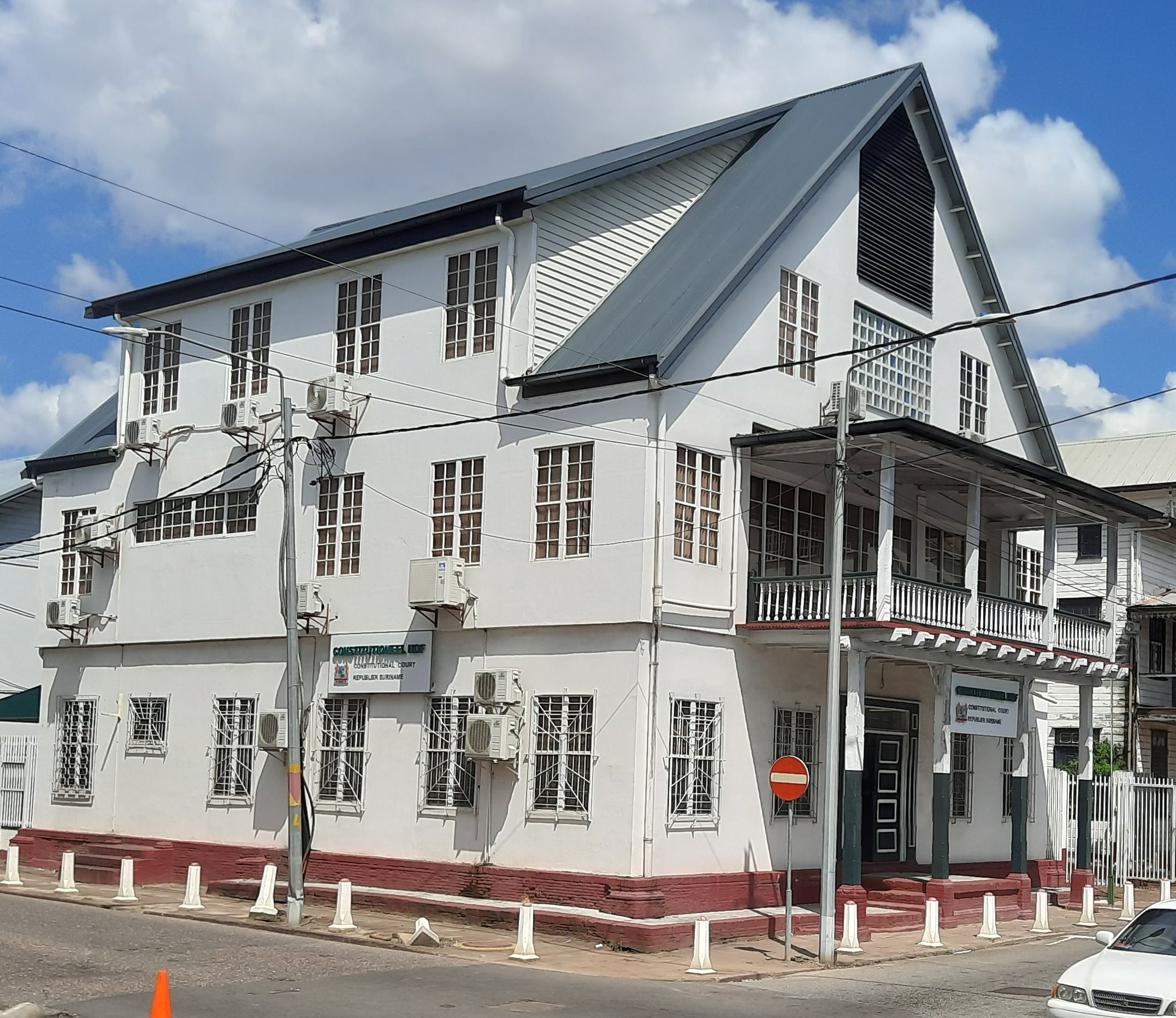
Constitutional Court of Suriname

The judiciary is headed by the Court of Justice (Supreme Court). This court supervises the magistrate courts. Members are appointed for life by the president in consultation with the National Assembly, the State Advisory Council, and the National Order of Private Attorneys.

A Constitutional Court was established in 2019.

== Administrative divisions ==
Map of districts in Suriname

The country is divided into 10 administrative districts, each headed by a District Commissioner appointed by the president. The commissioner serves at the president's pleasure. The 10 districts (distrikten, singular - district) are; Brokopondo, Commewijne, Coronie, Marowijne, Nickerie, Para, Paramaribo, Saramacca, Sipaliwini, Wanica.

The districts including Paramaribo are further subdivided into resorts. There are 63 resorts in Suriname.

== See also ==
- Flag of Suriname
- Foreign relations of Suriname
