= List of members of the National Assembly (Suriname), 2020–2025 =

Here is the list of the 51 members installed on June 29 in the National Assembly for the 2020–2025 term following the 2020 general election, grouped by party list.

== VHP ==
Name	District	Notes
Dew Sharman	Paramaribo	Vice-chairman
Krishna Mathoera	Paramaribo	Succeeded on 7 August 2020 by Kishan Ramsukul
Riad Nurmohamed	Paramaribo	Succeeded on 7 August 2020 by Ronny Aloema
Sham Binda	Paramaribo	
Cheryl Dijksteel	Paramaribo	
Cedric van Samson	Paramaribo	
Rui Wang	Paramaribo	
Chan Santokhi	Wanica	Succeeded on 7 August 2020 by Henk Aviankoi
Asis Gajadien	Wanica	
Reshma Mangre	Wanica	
Sidik Moertabat	Wanica	
Mohammad Mohab-Ali	Wanica	
Mohamedsafiek Gowrie	Nickerie	
Niesha Jhakry	Nickerie	
Harriët Ramdien	Nickerie	
Stephen Madsaleh	Nickerie	
Radjinder Debie	Saramacca	
Mahinder Jogi	Saramacca	
Roy Mohan	Commewijne	
Soerjani Mingoen-Karijomenawi	Commewijne	

== ABOP/PL ==
Name	Party	District	Notes
Ronnie Brunswijk	ABOP	Marowijne	Chairman (initial sessions) Succeeded on 7 August 2020 by Geneviévre Jordan
Marinus Bee	ABOP	Marowijne	Chairman
Edward Belfort	ABOP	Paramaribo	
Miquella Soemar-Huur	PL	Wanica	member of ABOP, elected from PL list
Obed Kanapé	ABOP	Sipaliwini	
Evert Karto	PL	Commewijne	
Ramon Koedemoesoe	ABOP	Para	
Diana Pokie	ABOP	Brokopondo	Succeeded on 7 August 2020 by Fogatie Aserie
Edgar Sampie	ABOP	Paramaribo	
Dinotha Vorswijk	ABOP	Sipaliwini	Succeeded on 27 August 2021 by Renet Wahki

== NPS ==
Naam	District
Gregory Rusland	Paramaribo
Patricia Etnel	Paramaribo
Ivanildo Plein	Paramaribo

== BEP ==
Naam	District
Ronny Asabina	Brokopondo
Remi Kanapé	Sipaliwini

== NDP ==
Name	District	Notes
Sergio Akiemboto	Brokopondo	Succeeded on 11 March 2021 by Wilsientje van Emden
Melvin Bouva	Paramaribo	
Iona Edwards	Sipaliwini	
Ebu Jones	Nickerie	
Patrick Kensenhuis	Para	
Jayant Lalbiharie	Saramacca	
André Misiekaba	Paramaribo	Succeeded on 1 September 2020 by Tashana Lösche
Soewarto Moestadja	Paramaribo	Acted as chairman for first meeting, as oldest member
Rabin Parmessar	Paramaribo	
Claudie Sabajo	Marowijne	
Ann Sadi	Commewijne	
Stephen Tsang	Paramaribo	
Remie Tarnadi	Coronie	
Jennifer Vreedzaam	Para	
Joan Wielzen	Coronie	
Ashwin Adhin	Wanica	Sworn on 6 August 2020
