= 2025 Surinamese general election =

- 25 May 2025
- All 51 seats in the National Assembly; 26 seats needed for a majority
- Turnout: 69.36% (▼4.68pp)
Party	Leader	Vote %	Seats	+/–
NDP	Jennifer Geerlings-Simons	34.18	18	+2
VHP	Chan Santokhi	31.78	17	−3
ABOP	Ronnie Brunswijk	11.63	6	−2
NPS	Gregory Rusland	11.42	6	+3
PL	Paul Somohardjo	3.77	2	0
A20	Steven Reyme	2.73	1	+1
BEP	Ronny Asabina	2.61	1	−1
This lists parties that won seats. See the complete results below.
Results by district
President before	President after
Chan Santokhi; VHP	Jennifer Geerlings-Simons; NDP

General elections were held in Suriname on 25 May 2025. No party obtained a majority in the 51-seat National Assembly, with the National Democratic Party (NDP) winning 18 seats followed by the ruling Progressive Reform Party of outgoing President Chan Santokhi with 17.

Following the elections the NDP formed a coalition government with the General Liberation and Development Party, the National Party of Suriname, Pertjajah Luhur, Alternative 2020 and the Brotherhood and Unity in Politics, with NDP leader Jennifer Geerlings-Simons becoming Suriname's first female president.

== Background ==
The date was announced by president Chan Santokhi in his annual speech at the National Assembly on 1 October 2024. After his resignation in mid-October 2024 as minister of Internal Affairs, Bronto Somohardjo was succeeded one and a half months later by Delano Landvreugd as minister and Maurits Hassankhan as deputy minister. Hassankhan was responsible for organizing the 2025 elections.

== Electoral system ==
The 51 seats in the National Assembly are elected using party-list proportional representation. Previous general elections had been held using ten multi-member constituencies, but following a ruling by the Constitutional Court in 2022 that judged that the malapportionment that existed was unconstitutional, it was decided to remedy this by abolishing the constituencies altogether, so that the legislature is elected from nationwide party lists. This case was started by Serena Essed. The National Assembly approved the new electoral system on 13 October 2023.

== Candidates ==
Fourteen parties contested the elections.

Party	Position	Ideology	Previous election
Progressive Reform Party	Centre to centre-right	Social democracy; Third Way; Civic nationalism	20 / 51 (39%)
National Democratic Party	Centre-left	Left-wing nationalism; Populism	16 / 51 (31%)
General Liberation and Development Party	Centre-left	Social democracy; Maroon interests	8 / 51 (16%)
National Party of Suriname	Centre-left	Social democracy	3 / 51 (6%)
Pertjajah Luhur	Single-issue	Javanese Surinamese interests; Mutualism (gotong royong)	2 / 51 (4%)
Brotherhood and Unity in Politics	Centre-left	Social democracy	2 / 51 (4%)

== Campaign ==
Among the major campaign issues was the management of potential revenues from recently discovered oil deposits, with National Democratic Party (NDP) leader Jennifer Geerlings-Simons pledging to require "all enterprises to work with Surinamese and buy Suriname products" as part of efforts to ensure access by the population to benefits from oil revenues. Incumbent president Chan Santokhi, of the Progressive Reform Party (VHP), pledged to maintain Suriname's status as a carbon-negative country and use some of the oil revenues in the transition towards a green economy and related projects, noting that the reserves would be exhausted in 40 years. He also pledged to use the revenues for cash handouts under the "Royalties for Everyone" program.

== Results ==
Initial results showed that no party obtained a majority in the National Assembly, with the NDP winning 18 seats followed by the ruling VHP at 17. The remaining 16 seats were won by smaller parties. Turnout was estimated to be at least 58%. On 27 May, the NDP announced that it had finalized a coalition agreement with the General Liberation and Development Party, the National Party of Suriname, Pertjajah Luhur, Alternative 2020 and the Brotherhood and Unity in Politics. The coalition had enough votes to elect Jennifer Geerlings-Simons as Suriname's first female president. Between them, the parties in the NDP-led coalition have 34 seats, exactly the two-thirds supermajority required to elect a president without the need for support from other parties.

On 3 July, the VHP said that it would not put forward a candidate against Geerlings-Simons. At the time, she had been the only person to lodge her candidacy. As expected, Geerlings-Simons was elected unopposed as president on 6 July with NPS leader Gregory Rusland as vice president.

Party	Votes	%	Seats	+/–
National Democratic Party	93,459	34.18	18	+2
Progressive Reform Party	86,912	31.78	17	−3
General Liberation and Development Party	31,798	11.63	6	−2
National Party of Suriname	31,215	11.42	6	+3
Pertjajah Luhur	10,300	3.77	2	0
Alternative 2020	7,461	2.73	1	+1
Brotherhood and Unity in Politics	7,128	2.61	1	−1
Option for Suriname	1,634	0.60	0	0
Democratic Alternative '91	1,537	0.56	0	0
The New Lion	649	0.24	0	0
Arena Political Party	517	0.19	0	0
People's Party for a Livable Suriname	339	0.12	0	New
Democratic Union of Suriname	335	0.12	0	0
Party of Communication	160	0.06	0	New
Total	273,444	100.00	51	0
Valid votes	273,444	98.57		
Invalid/blank votes	3,961	1.43		
Total votes	277,405	100.00		
Registered voters/turnout	399,932	69.36		
Source: Centraal Hoofdstembureau

=== Results by district ===
Results by district (preliminary)
District	NDP		VHP		ABOP		NPS		PL		A20		BEP		Others		Total
District	#	%	#	%	#	%	#	%	#	%	#	%	#	%	#	%	Total
Brokopondo	2,753	45.98%	45	0.75%	1,193	19.93%	811	13.55%	1	0.02%	34	0.57%	1,091	18.22%	59	0.99%	5,987
Commewijne	5,804	31.63%	6,847	37.31%	1,349	7.35%	1,189	6.48%	2,201	11.99%	399	2.17%	112	0.61%	450	2.45%	18,351
Coronie	813	55.72%	102	6.99%	52	3.56%	399	27.35%	26	1.78%	22	1.51%	3	0.21%	42	2.88%	1,459
Marowijne	2,292	20.12%	418	3.67%	7,695	67.57%	373	3.28%	53	0.47%	121	1.06%	375	3.29%	62	0.54%	11,389
Nickerie	5,484	30.29%	9,716	53.66%	479	2.65%	862	4.76%	1,069	5.90%	126	0.70%	81	0.45%	289	1.60%	18,106
Para	8,308	56.08%	1,395	9.42%	1,668	11.26%	2,020	13.63%	347	2.34%	513	3.46%	320	2.16%	244	1.65%	14,815
Paramaribo	40,465	37.00%	29,868	27.31%	9,986	9.13%	18,014	16.47%	2,657	2.43%	4,062	3.71%	1,910	1.75%	2,408	2.20%	109,370
Saramacca	3,828	37.14%	5,078	49.27%	338	3.28%	358	3.47%	357	3.46%	188	1.82%	8	0.08%	151	1.47%	10,306
Sipaliwini	4,930	42.69%	232	2.01%	3,189	27.62%	1,121	9.71%	5	0.04%	61	0.53%	1,815	15.72%	195	1.69%	11,548
Wanica	18,601	25.98%	33,087	46.22%	5,777	8.07%	5,978	8.35%	3,545	4.95%	1,919	2.68%	1,396	1.95%	1,284	1.79%	71,587
