= Seeka =

Political party in Suriname

- Leader: Paul Abena
- Ideology: Interests of rural inhabitants
- National affiliation: Formerly part of A-Combination, later A Nyun combination
- National Assembly: 0 As of 2020

Seeka (Ndyuka for 'renewal') is a Surinamese political party led by Paul Abena representing the interests of rural inhabitants. Starting in 2005, it ran as part of the "A-Combination" together with the General Liberation and Development Party and the Brotherhood and Unity in Politics, which received 7.3% of the popular votes and five out of 51 seats in The National Assembly. It left the A-Combination in 2015 to form the A Nyun Combination together with the BP-2011 and the Rural Inhabitants' Party, which did not receive a seat in the 2015 general election. Since 2018, the party co-operates with the General Liberation and Development Party, although an attempt to form a joint list was hindered by an anti-list combination law passed by Dési Bouterse.

== History and Political Alliances ==
Seeka became part of the "A-Combination" alliance in 2005, along with the General Liberation and Development Party (ABOP) and the Brotherhood and Unity in Politics (BEP). In the 2005 general election, the A-Combination secured 7.3% of the popular vote, earning five out of 51 seats in the National Assembly.

In 2015, Seeka left the A-Combination to form a new alliance called "A Nyun Combination" with BP-2011 and the Rural Inhabitants' Party. However, this new coalition failed to win any seats in the 2015 general election.

Since 2018, Seeka has been cooperating with the General Liberation and Development Party (ABOP). However, efforts to form a joint electoral list were complicated by the passage of an anti-list combination law by then-President Dési Bouterse.
