= Patrick Pengel =

Surinamese politician

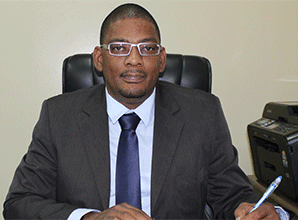

Minister of Public Health
- In office 12 August 2015 – 4 April 2018
- Preceded by: Michel Blokland
- Succeeded by: Antoine Elias

Personal details
- Party: National Democratic Party

Patrick Pengel is a Surinamese politician was Minister of Public Health from 2015 until 4 April 2018.
