= A-Combination =

The A-Combination (Dutch: A-Combinatie) was a political alliance in Suriname.

== History ==
The A-Combinatie was formed in 2005 as an alliance of Brotherhood and Unity in Politics (BEP), the General Liberation and Development Party (ABOP) and Seeka, and represented the Maroons. The alliance received 7% of the vote in the 2005 general elections, winning five seats. Although its vote share fell to 5% in the 2010 elections, it retained all five seats. However, in 2012 the BEP left the alliance after disagreeing with the leadership of ABOP head Ronnie Brunswijk.

Prior to the 2015 elections Seeka left the A-Combination to join A Nyun Combinatie. However, the alliance was joined by the Party for National Unity and Solidarity (which had pulled out of the V7 alliance) and the Party for Democracy and Development. In the elections the alliance received 11% of the vote, winning five seats.

The coalition was dissolved prior to the 2020 elections.
