= Ines Pané =

Surinamese politician

- Pané in 2023

Personal details
- Born: 1980–1981

Ines Yuqinda Pané is a Surinamese politician who is Suriname's Minister of Social Affairs and Housing. She is aligned with the General Liberation and Development Party (ABOP).

== Career ==
In 2013, she was part of a delegation from the CARIFESTA Commission of the Association of Indigenous Village Chiefs in Suriname (VIDS) to then Minister of the Interior, Soewarto Moestadja, about that year's International Day of the World's Indigenous Peoples celebrations.

Pané became the Minister of Social Affairs and Housing on 11 December 2023, after being nominated by the ABOP and Pertjajah Luhur (PL).
