= Alternative 2020 =

Political party in Suriname

Alternative 2020 Alternatief 2020
- Abbreviation: A20
- Chairperson: Steven Reyme
- Founded: June 2019
- Ideology: Christian democracy
- Political position: Centre-right
- Colors: Sky blue
- National Assembly: 1 / 51

Website
- https://alternatief2020.com/

Alternative 2020 (Dutch: Alternatief 2020, A20) is a political party in Suriname formed in June 2019.

== History ==
The party is led by the pastor Steven Reyme of the Pentecostal Full Gospel Church Logos International in Paramaribo. The party is based on Christian norms and values. Reyme also says he is open to people from other religious groups, because all religions strive for the same thing. When he held the first information meeting of the party in the Logos church, his initiative was negatively received. The proclamation of Alternative 2020 took place on 12 October 2019, in the ballroom of the Torarica hotel; this meeting was very well attended.

In addition, the party is focused on corruption, which the country suffers from according to its founder. The party wants to put an end to patronage politics. Reyme believes that someone with a political position should not have a criminal record.

The founding documents were filed with the Ministry of Justice and Police on approximately 9 June 2019.

The party participated in all districts during the 2020 elections but did not win any seats. In the 2025 Surinamese general election, A20 worked together with DOE (Democracy and Development in Unity) and PRO (Partij voor Recht en Ontwikkeling). The candidates of these three parties were on the A20 list together. The party won one seat in the National Assembly and wants to be part of a coalition government with the National Democratic Party as led by Jennifer Geerlings-Simons.
