= Soerjani Mingoen-Karijomenawi =

Surinamese politician

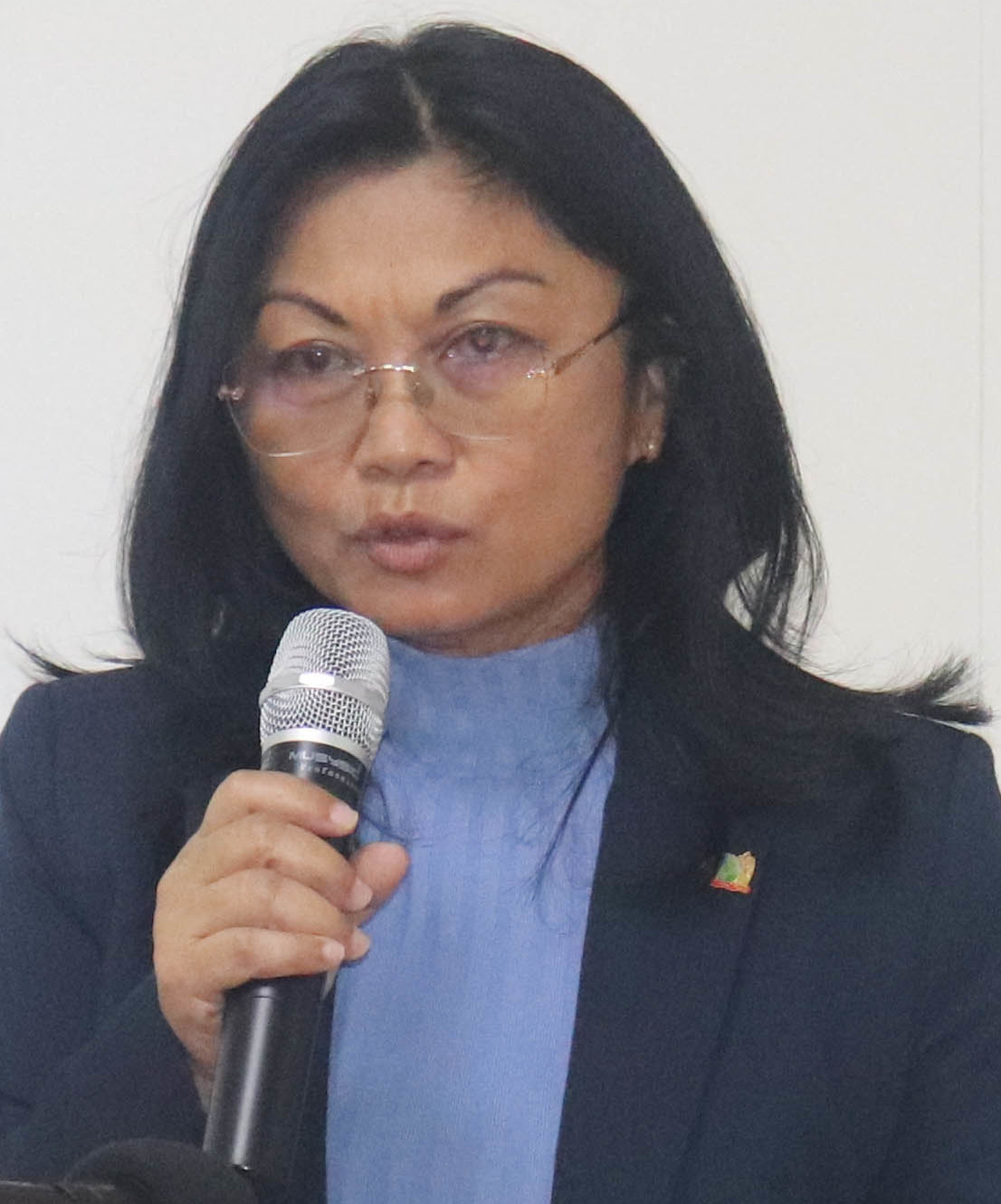
- Mingoen in 2022

Member of the National Assembly
- Incumbent
- Assumed office 2020
- Constituency: Commewijne District

Personal details
- Party: VHP; Pertjajah Luhur (until 2018)
- Occupation: teacher, politician

Soerjani Mingoen (née Karijomenawi) is a Surinamese politician. She has been a member of the National Assembly since 2020, representing Commewijne District for the Progressive Reform Party (VHP).

== Biography ==
Mingoen is of Javanese descent. She was a co-founder of the Music Education Center Commewijne (MECC) in 2010.

Mingoen was originally a supporter of the Javanese party Pertjajah Luhur (PL). She was disappointed in this party when, against previous promises, it joined the first Cabinet (2010–2015) of President Desi Bouterse. She also opposed the PL's support of the Amnesty Law (2012), which prevented prosecution of the December murders. According to her, the PL had deceived the Javanese community.

Mingoen followed the developments of the Progressive Reform Party (VHP) under the chairmanship of Chan Santokhi. As she found herself agreeing with Santokhi's positions, she eventually joined the VHP in 2018. In December 2019, she and VHP youth members traveled to Richelieu and Meerzorg for Christmas carol singing with keyboard and saxophone accompaniment.

During the general elections in 2020, Mingoen was a candidate on the VHP list in Commewijne District. She was elected to the National Assembly.
