= 1999 Surinamese protests =

The 1999 Surinamese protests were a series of demonstrations calling for the fall of the government of Jules Wijdenbosch amid economic deterioration and political deadlock in Suriname. Protesters marched and participated in nonviolent festivals, carnivals, clapping strikes, human chains, gatherings, gathered in speeches, chanted and used peaceful tactics as a form of rallies and peaceful actions during protests. Large-scale demonstrations occurred due to the dire conditions and poor living standards, calling on the government to step down immediately. Concerns was shared and the protesters shared their dissatisfaction with the government while voicing their opposition and anger at the government's handling of the economic situation. Thousands participated in the next 2 months of protest movement, democratic rallies and demonstrations against the regime in mainly Paramaribo and other cities. 10,000-50,000 participated in protests calling for wage increases and lower food costs. Unions, students, workers and teachers planned and staged mass strikes and waves of demonstrations across May, June and July, led by the opposition, but by July, the opposition called off the street protests, commenting that Jules Wijdenbosch would stay in power until the next elections.

== See also ==
- History of Suriname
