= Megacombinatie =

Surinamese political alliance in the 2010 election

The Megacombinatie (also written as MEGA Combinatie and Mega Combinatie) was a political alliance in the 2010 Surinamese general election. The alliance was founded on 5 July 2008 and consisted of:

- The National Democratic Party (NDP) led by Dési Bouterse;
- The Progressive Workers' and Farmers' Union (PALU) led by Jim Hok;
- New Suriname (NS) led by John Nasibdar;
- Party for National Unity and Solidarity (KTPI) led by Willy Soemita.
