= 2015 Surinamese general election =

- 25 May 2015
- 51 seats in the National Assembly; 26 seats needed for a majority
- Turnout: 74.65% (▼0.73pp)
Party	Leader	Vote %	Seats	+/–
NDP	Ricardo Panka	45.49	26	+7
V7	Chan Santokhi	37.27	18	
AC	Ronnie Brunswijk	10.63	5	−2
DOE	Carl Breeveld	4.30	1	0
PALU	Jim Hok	0.67	1	0
This lists parties that won seats. See the complete results below.
Results by district
Chairman of the National Assembly before	Chairman of the National Assembly after
Jennifer Simons; NDP	Jennifer Simons; NDP

General elections were held in Suriname on 25 May 2015. The National Democratic Party won an absolute majority on its own for the first time.

== Electoral system ==
The 51 seats in the National Assembly were elected using proportional representation in ten multi-member constituencies containing between two and seventeen seats. The ten electoral constituencies are coterminous with the ten administrative districts of Suriname. The National Assembly subsequently elects the president.

== Results ==
Party	Votes	%	Seats	+/–
National Democratic Party	117,205	45.49	26	+7
V7	96,008	37.27	18	–
A-Combination	27,374	10.63	5	–2
Democracy and Development through Unity	11,069	4.30	1	0
Progressive Workers' and Farmers' Union	1,736	0.67	1	0
A Nyun Combinatie (Seeka–BP-2011–PBP)	1,045	0.41	0	–
Mega Front (DUS–DNL–NS)	1,025	0.40	0	–
Amazon Party Suriname	786	0.31	0	New
Sustainable & Just Living Together	663	0.26	0	New
Party for Integrity, National Motivation and Equality	411	0.16	0	New
National Development Party	303	0.12	0	New
Total	257,625	100.00	51	0
Valid votes	257,625	96.88		
Invalid/blank votes	8,284	3.12		
Total votes	265,909	100.00		
Registered voters/turnout	356,223	74.65		
Source: Verkiezingen, Consulytic

== Aftermath ==
Incumbent president Dési Bouterse was reelected by the National Assembly unopposed on 14 July 2015.
