= 2010 Surinamese general election =

- 25 May 2010
- 51 seats in the National Assembly; 26 seats needed for a majority
- Turnout: 75.38% (▲9.45pp)
Party	Leader	Vote %	Seats	+/–
Megacombinatie	Dési Bouterse	40.20	23	New
NFDO	Ronald Venetiaan	31.63	14	−9
VVV	Jules Wijdenbosch	13.03	6	+1
DOE	Carl Breeveld	5.09	1	New
AC	Ronnie Brunswijk	4.67	7	+2
This lists parties that won seats. See the complete results below.
Results by district
Chairman of the National Assembly before	Chairman of the National Assembly after
Paul Somohardjo; Pertjajah Luhur	Jennifer Simons; NDP

General elections were held in Suriname on 25 May 2010.

Nine entities contested the election, including several coalitions. Pre-election polls suggested a share of 41% of the vote going to the "Mega Combination" coalition that includes the National Democratic Party of former dictator Dési Bouterse. The ruling Nieuw Front (NF) had around 22.5% support. There were 324,490 people registered to vote in the election which would determine the holders of 51 parliament seats, 116 regional positions and 752 municipal positions.

== Results ==
Preliminary results issued on 26 May 2010 showed the Mega Combination winning a plurality of 23 seats, up from 15 in the last election. The New Front for Democracy and Development alliance of incumbent President Ronald Venetiaan (who had stated before the election that he would not seek another term) was said to have won 14 seats. Venetiaan ruled out working together with the NDP as long as it was led by Bouterse. In the following indirect presidential election in July 2010, a two-thirds majority was required to elect the next president. Organisation of American States election observers reported a peaceful election with no irregularities.

Bouterse had not stated if he would seek to return to the presidency. Dutch Foreign Minister Maxime Verhagen said that the Dutch government would respect the will of the voters of Suriname, despite Bouterse having been sentenced to 11 years in prison by a Dutch court for drug dealing. An Interpol arrest warrant was issued for him, but Suriname does not extradite its citizens.

Party	Votes	%	Seats
Megacombinatie	95,482	40.20	23
New Front for Democracy and Development	75,118	31.63	14
People's Alliance	30,943	13.03	6
Democracy and Development through Unity	12,094	5.09	1
BVD–PV FAL	12,076	5.08	0
A-Combination	11,093	4.67	7
Democratic Union Suriname	285	0.12	0
Permanent Prosperity Republic of Suriname	259	0.11	0
National Union	149	0.06	0
Total	237,499	100.00	51
Valid votes	237,499	97.13	
Invalid/blank votes	7,024	2.87	
Total votes	244,523	100.00	
Registered voters/turnout	324,369	75.38	
Source: Centraal HoofdStembureau

== Aftermath ==
The NDP successfully concluded a coalition deal with Bouterse's former opponents in the civil war, the A Combinatie, giving him a majority in parliament, but not the two-thirds majority required to elect the president. Negotiations with the People's Alliance to attain the necessary supermajority reportedly failed after the People's Alliance raised excessive demands.

The NDP fell out with the A Combinatie over the number of cabinet posts, however, and subsequently, the New Front (led by the National Party of Suriname) formed a coalition deal with the A Combinatie and the People's Alliance, giving them 27 seats in parliament, enough to form the government, but too few to elect the president. It was seen as a possibility that Bouterse might be elected in the final round of the presidential election (when it goes to the People's Assembly, where the NDP has a majority.

In a surprise development, Jennifer Geerlings-Simons from the NDP was elected Chairwoman of the House on 30 June 2010 with 26 to 24 votes, even though the anti-NDP parties had a majority in parliament. The NPS's Ruth Wijdenbosch was elected Vice Chairwoman with 25 to 24 votes.

In the run-up to the presidential election on 19 July 2010, Bouterse convinced the A Combinatie to join forces with him, giving him a 30-seat majority; immediately before the election, he succeeded in getting the People's Alliance to join him, giving him the votes required to become president.
