= Reform and Renewal Movement =

Political party in Suriname

- Leader: Mike Noersalim
- Founded: 28 October 2017
- Headquarters: Paramaribo
- Ideology: Javanese interests

Website
- http://hvb.sr/

The Reform and Renewal Movement (Dutch: Hervormings- en Vernieuwingsbeweging) is a political party in Suriname. The party is primarily supported by Javanese Surinamese.

== Founding ==
The party started as a political movement within the Pertjajah Luhur (PL). It was led by Mike Noersalim until he was appointed Minister of the Interior in 2015. Shortly after the 2015 elections, Raymond Sapoen and Diepak Chitan left the PL but retained their seats in the National Assembly (DNA). In October, Noersalim, as minister, ensured that the two lawmakers had their own grouping in the DNA. In December, he was expelled from the PL as a member.

A number of lawsuits were filed by the PL with the aim of recalling both parliamentarians. The PL won three of these lawsuits, but the ruling National Democratic Party passed a new recall law which invalidated these rulings.

On 28 October 2017, the HVB was inaugurated as a new political party with Noersalim as leader. The party stipulates a term limit of 10 years for its leader.

== 2020 elections ==
The HVB competed in eight districts in the 2020 elections but did not win any seats.
