= Constitutional Court of Suriname =

Constitutional court for Suriname

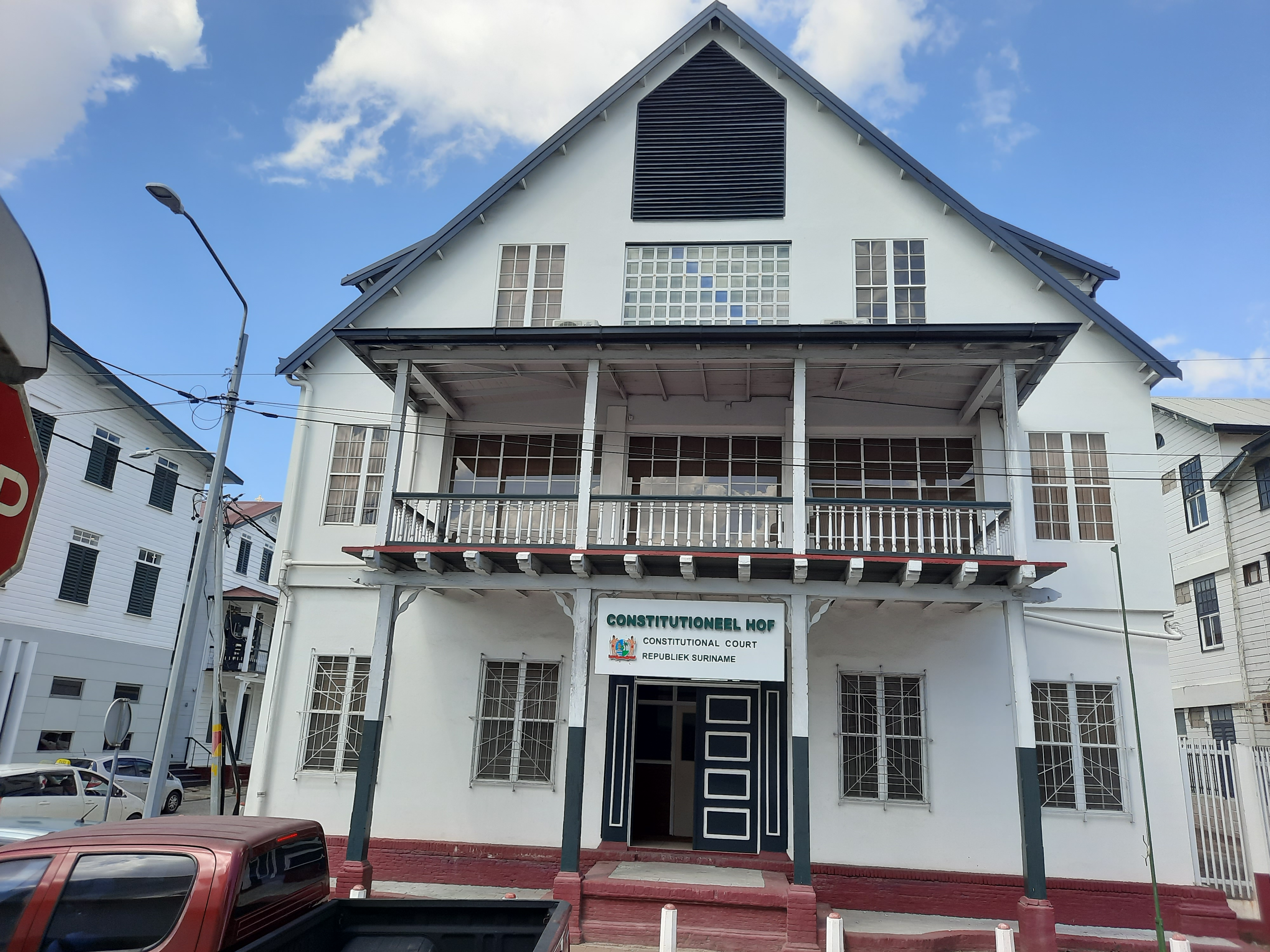
- Constitutional Court of Suriname building in Paramaribo
- Established: 2020
- Jurisdiction: Suriname
- Location: Paramaribo, Suriname
- Composition method: Appointment by the President upon nomination by the National Assembly
- Authorised by: Article 144 of the Constitution of Suriname
- Judge term length: 5 years (once renewable)
- Number of positions: 8

President
- Currently: Gloria Karg-Stirling
- Since: 7 May 2020

Vice President
- Currently: Kenneth Amoksi
- Since: 7 May 2020

The Constitutional Court (Dutch: Constitutioneel hof) is the constitutional court for the Republic of Suriname. Its establishment was already foreseen in both the constitution of Suriname of 1975 and the current constitution of 1987, but it took until 4 October 2019 for the National Assembly to enact a law providing for the establishment of a constitutional court. After some errors concerning the official proclamation of the establishment of the court were corrected, the members of the court were installed on 7 May 2020.

The lack of a constitutional court became an imminent problem after the court-martial decided in 2015 that the 2012 amnesty law that should have halted the prosecution of the December murders must be tested in the constitutional court first.

== Composition ==
The composition of the court is as follows:

President

- Gloria Karg-Stirling

Vice President

- Kenneth Amoksi

Members

- Anoeradha Akkal-Ramautar
- Rinette Djokarto
- Maya Fokké-Manohar

Substitute members

- Bien Sojo
- Jornell Vinkwolk
- Roy Chitanie

== See also ==
- Constitutional Court of Sint Maarten
