= 2020 Surinamese general election =

- 25 May 2020
- All 51 seats in the National Assembly; 26 seats needed for a majority
- Turnout: 74.04% (▼0.61pp)
Party	Leader	Vote %	Seats	+/–
VHP	Chan Santokhi	39.45	20	+11
NDP	Dési Bouterse	23.97	16	−10
NPS	Gregory Rusland	11.79	3	+1
ABOP (Note: ABOP member Miquella Soemar-Huur was elected as lijstduwer on PL's list in Wanica, and is included in PL's seat total.)	Ronnie Brunswijk	9.08	8	+3
PL	Paul Somohardjo	6.05	2	−3
BEP	Ronny Asabina	2.49	2	0
This lists parties that won seats. See the complete results below.
Results by district
President before	President after
Dési Bouterse; NDP	Chan Santokhi; VHP

General elections were held in Suriname on 25 May 2020. The elections occurred concurrently with an economic crisis in Suriname, as well as the COVID-19 crisis.

== Electoral system ==
The 51 seats in the National Assembly are elected using party-list proportional representation under the D'Hondt method in ten multi-member constituencies containing between two and seventeen seats. The ten electoral constituencies are coterminous with the ten administrative districts of Suriname. Voters also have the option of casting a preferential vote for one of the candidates on the chosen list in order to increase their place in the list, and the candidate(s) having obtained the most preferential votes in the lists that obtained seats are declared elected. The National Assembly subsequently elects the President.

== Campaign ==
Both the V7 and A-Combination coalitions were dissolved shortly after the previous elections in 2015. Electoral alliances (which may have allowed residual votes of the combined parties to obtain an extra seat) were banned in 2019. The Amazon Party and Party for Law and Development decided to cooperate for the elections, with Amazon Party candidates appearing on the list of the Party of Law and Development. The pair of ABOP and Pertjajah Luhur, as well as the pair of BEP and HVB, also decided to cooperate, opening their lists in certain regions to the other if one lacked a viable presence there.

As a new parliament elects the president of the country after it sits, incumbent President Dési Bouterse (who had been ruling since 2010) and his NDP were hoping to pull off an election win in order to re-elect him for a third term, thereby retaining his national immunity from arrest for homicide charges he was convicted of by a Surinamese military court in 2019 regarding his involvement in the December murders. Europol also had an active warrant out for his arrest since 16 July 1999 for cocaine trafficking, although Suriname does not extradite its own citizens.

=== Economy ===
The second Bouterse cabinet was inaugurated in 2015 amid a recession that would peak the following year. The country's debt would end up nearly doubling between 2015 and 2019, partially because of economic woes as well as increased government spending and hiring of new government employees, which then made up 53% of the country's workforce (with an average wage of under US$350 per month). A poll among the readers on the website of Dagblad Suriname, a popular newspaper, showed that about two weeks before the elections, around 90% were concerned about the debts that Suriname had to pay off.

In January 2020, it was announced that the equivalent of around US$100 million had disappeared from the Central Bank of Suriname (CBvS). Robert-Gray van Trikt, the Governor of the Central Bank, was remanded in custody on suspicion of conflicts of interest and falsification of loan dates. In April, the Public Prosecutor's Office filed a request with the National Assembly to indict Minister of Finance Gillmore Hoefdraad with the aim of prosecuting him.

The Inter-American Development Bank also forecast a 5.6% decline in the economy due to COVID-19, and during the same time, prices for oil (a well of which was recently discovered off the country's coast) sharply fell, causing a loss of interest from investors. The government also passed a law on 22 March temporarily blocking foreign exchange transactions as a result of the value of the Surinamese dollar falling. On 1 April, Standard & Poor's downgraded the country's credit rating from B to CCC.

=== COVID-19 ===
The elections took place during the COVID-19 pandemic. Suriname's first case was diagnosed on 13 March, and the country closed its borders completely the following day. A curfew from 8pm to 6am was implemented over the following weeks.

== Conduct ==
The vote still had not been officially certified four days after the election. Four opposition parties alleged that this was because the ruling National Democratic Party was attempting to tamper with the results. On 28 May Ronnie Brunswijk of the opposition General Liberation and Development Party stated that NDP-affiliated people, including Dési Bouterse's grandson, came to the building where votes were being counted and attempted to steal boxes of votes and start fires.

On 28 May the Onafhankelijk Kiesbureau (Independent Electoral Office) announced that it would take at least two weeks before the electoral results were declared final. After four new cases of COVID-19 were identified, the process of counting the votes was halted.

== Results ==
The final results were released on 16 June, with no change in seat allocation from the preliminary figures. Candidates subsequently had two weeks to either raise objections, or approve the results. On 19 June, the Independent Electoral Office declared the results binding, but the results of Tammenga and Pontbuiten would be re-examined, and the results published within three weeks. On 3 July, the results from Tammenga and Pontbuiten were declared binding. There were only minor changes in the counts, and no significant shifts.

The VHP had its best election result since 1973, more than doubling its previous number of seats and becoming the largest party in the National Assembly. President Dési Bouterse's NDP lost more than a third of its seats, which was partly attributed to the country's economic problems and the criminal charges brought against him. ABOP had its best result since its foundation in 1990, winning eight seats, while the PL had its worst result since its establishment, winning only two seats, with one of them being an ABOP member acting as lijstduwer in Wanica.

Party	Votes	%	Seats	+/–
Progressive Reform Party	108,378	39.45	20	+11
National Democratic Party	65,862	23.97	16	–10
National Party of Suriname	32,394	11.79	3	+1
General Liberation and Development Party	24,956	9.08	8	+3
Pertjajah Luhur	16,623	6.05	2	–3
Reform and Renewal Movement	7,423	2.70	0	New
Brotherhood and Unity in Politics	6,835	2.49	2	0
Alternative 2020	4,501	1.64	0	New
Democracy and Development through Unity	2,375	0.86	0	–1
Party for Law and Development–Amazon Party	1,593	0.58	0	0
Surinamese Labour Party	922	0.34	0	0
Progressive Workers' and Farmers' Union	820	0.30	0	–1
STREI!	700	0.25	0	New
Democratic Alternative '91	659	0.24	0	0
People's Party for Renewal and Democracy	349	0.13	0	0
Social Democratic Union	254	0.09	0	New
The New Wind	70	0.03	0	New
Total	274,714	100.00	51	0
Valid votes	274,714	96.79		
Invalid/blank votes	9,120	3.21		
Total votes	283,834	100.00		
Registered voters/turnout	383,333	74.04		
Source: Centraal Hoofdstembureau

=== Seats by district ===
District	ABOP	BEP	NDP	NPS	PL	VHP	Total
Brokopondo	1	1	1				3
Commewijne			1		1	2	4
Coronie			2				2
Marowijne	2		1				3
Nickerie			1			4	5
Para	1		2				3
Paramaribo	2		5	3		7	17
Saramacca			1			2	3
Sipaliwini	2	1	1				4
Wanica			1		1	5	7
Total	8	2	16	3	2	20	51

=== Party votes by district ===
District	VHP (20)	NDP (16)	NPS (3)	ABOP (8)	PL (2)	HVB (0)	BEP (2)	A20 (0)	DOE (0)	PRO/APS (0)	SPA (0)	PALU (0)	STREI! (0)	DA'91 (0)	VVD (0)	SDU (0)	DNW (0)	Total
Brokopondo	97	1,797	357	1,793			1,223	25			32							5,324
Commewijne	8,226	4,471	1,043		3,673	980		222	66		31		84	45				18,841
Coronie	51	919	389	88				7		19		147						1,620
Marowijne	356	1,983	111	5,476		128	351	100		45	14				13			8,577
Nickerie	11,783	4,532	775		1,482	952		131			30			70				19,755
Para	1,693	5,114	1,870	2,148		606	296	372	39	393	85			16	30			12,662
Paramaribo	38,780	29,495	21,654	11,644	2,616	2,571	1,872	2,559	1,657	749	363	429	470	414	226	111	56	115,666
Saramacca	5,775	3,044	703		439	625		109			17							10,712
Sipaliwini	503	3,024	900	3,807		171	1,876	42	16	87	152					35		10,613
Wanica	41,114	11,483	4,592		8,413	1,390	1,217	934	597	300	198	244	146	114	80	108	14	70,944
Total	108,378	65,862	32,394	24,956	16,623	7,423	6,835	4,501	2,375	1,593	922	820	700	659	349	254	70	274,714

== Aftermath ==
On 28 May, it was announced that VHP and ABOP had started negotiations for a coalition government, and that it was likely that the NPS would be included. The PL also expressed interest. The coalition of the four parties would have 33 seats (a majority) in the National Assembly. However, the constitution requires the president to be elected by a two-thirds supermajority in the Assembly, meaning the coalition would either need the support of an NDP or BEP lawmaker in order to elect the coalition's choice, or would need to put forward a nominee acceptable to at least one of the other two parties. If the National Assembly fails to elect a candidate, a joint meeting of the Assembly, districts and the resorts (De Verenigde Volksvergadering) is held, with a winner elected by a majority vote.

On 30 May it was announced that a coalition had been formed consisting of VHP, ABOP, NPS and PL. VHP leader Chan Santokhi announced his candidacy for President of Suriname, and ABOP leader Ronnie Brunswijk was announced as the coalition's candidate for Chairman of the National Assembly. Other positions allocated under the agreement include vice-chairman of the National Assembly and governor of the Central Bank of Suriname for the VHP, Minister of Home Affairs and Minister of Social Affairs for PL, and Minister of Education and Minister of Oil and Gas Affairs for the NPS. ABOP was given the nomination for vice president, as well as the Minister of Justice and Police, Minister of Trade, Industry & Tourism and Minister of Natural Resources and Regional Development. The remaining ministerial posts were to be held by the VHP.

On 29 June the National Assembly sat for its first session during which Ronnie Brunswijk was elected Chairman of the National Assembly unopposed. Dew Sharman became Vice Chairman. On 1 July Paul Somohardjo, Chairman of Pertjajah Luhur and coalition partner of the new government, was diagnosed with COVID-19. Testing revealed that NPS chairman Gregory Rusland and ABOP chairman Ronnie Brunswijk were also COVID-19 positive. On 3 July Dew Sharman, Vice Chairman of the National Assembly, announced that the presidential elections would be postponed until 10 July at the earliest, with the vote later set for 13 July. Potential candidates were required to announce their candidacy on 7 and 8 July.

On 7 July the coalition nominated Chan Santokhi for the presidency and Ronnie Brunswijk as vice president. The nominations were supported by all 33 coalition MPs. No other candidates were nominated by the deadline on 8 July, assuring the coalition's ticket would win unopposed. On 13 July, the Assembly elected Santokhi and Brunswijik by acclamation. They were inaugurated on 16 July on the Onafhankelijkheidsplein in Paramaribo in a ceremony held behind closed doors due to the COVID-19 pandemic. The Santokhi cabinet was sworn in the same day.

== See also ==
- List of members of the National Assembly (Suriname), 2020–2025
