= General Liberation and Development Party =

Political party in Suriname

General Liberation and Development Party Algemene Bevrijdings- en Ontwikkelingspartij
- Leader: Ronnie Brunswijk
- Founded: 11 February 1990
- Split from: BEP
- Ideology: Maroon interests
- National affiliation: A-Combination (formerly)
- National Assembly: 6 / 51

Website
- http://abop.sr/

The General Liberation and Development Party (Dutch: Algemene Bevrijdings- en Ontwikkelingspartij, ABOP) is a political party in Suriname, founded and chaired by ex-rebel leader Ronnie Brunswijk in 1990 after several members of the BEP were expelled. The former Vice President of Suriname, Robert Ameerali, is a member of the ABOP.

As a consequence of having originally split from the BEP, ABOP is similarly more popular among the country's Maroon community, especially in interior areas of the country.

In 2020, General Liberation and Development Party formed a coalition government with new president Chan Santokhi's Progressive Reform Party. Leader Ronnie Brunswijk became new Vice President of Suriname.

== Electoral results ==
Election	No. of overall seats won	Votes	+/–	Districts won	Government	Notes
1991	0 / 51	616		-	Extra-parliamentary	
1996	0 / 51	2,360		-	Extra-parliamentary	
2000	0 / 51	3,160		-	Extra-parliamentary	
2005	1 / 51		▲1	Marowijne: 1 (of 3)	Coalition	part of the A-Combination alliance with BEP and Seeka
2010	3 / 51		▲2	Marowijne: 2 (of 3) Sipaliwini: 1 (of 4)	Coalition	part of the A-Combination alliance with BEP and Seeka
2015	5 / 51	24,957	▲2	Paramaribo: 1 (of 17) Marowijne: 2 (of 3) Sipaliwini: 1 (of 4) Brokopondo: 1 (of 3)	Opposition	part of the A-Combination alliance with KTPI and PDO
2020	9 / 51	24,956	▲4	Paramaribo: 2 (of 17) Marowijne: 2 (of 3) Sipaliwini: 2 (of 4) Para: 1 (of 3) Brokopondo: 1 (of 3)	Coalition	
2025	6 / 51	31,798			Coalition	
