= Brotherhood and Unity in Politics =

Political party in Suriname

Brotherhood and Unity in Politics Broederschap en Eenheid in de Politiek
- Abbreviation: BEP
- Founded: 29 April 1973
- Split from: PBP
- Ideology: Social democracy Historical: Maroon interests
- Political position: Centre-left
- National affiliation: V7 (2015); A-Combination (formerly)
- National Assembly: 1 / 51

Brotherhood and Unity in Politics (Dutch: Broederschap en Eenheid in de Politiek, BEP) is a political party in Suriname founded on 29 April 1973.

== History ==
It was originally founded as the Bush Negro Unity Party (Dutch: Bosnegers Eenheid Partij) to represent the Maroon community in interior areas of the country and was renamed in 1987. It turned its focus away from the promotion of a specific ethnicity's interests, although it still enjoys popularity among the Maroon community.

The party did not participate in the elections of 1987, because the Surinamese Interior War made it difficult to access their members in the interior.

At the 2005 legislative election, the party was part of the "A-Combination", an alliance that won 7.5% of the popular vote and five out of 51 seats in the National Assembly.

In 2012, there was an internal struggle within the party. The party was part of the A-Combination, a union of all Maroon parties, but wanted to leave the alliance, however deputies Diana Pokie and Waldie Adjaiso opposed the suggestion causing a split within the party. In April 2012, BEP refused to support the Amnesty Law which would grant the suspects in the December Murders, including Dési Bouterse, immunity. In May 2012, the two ministers of the BEP were dismissed by Bouterse. Caprino Alendy who had been the chairperson since 1987 stepped down to be replaced by Celsius Waterberg.

In 2018, Ronny Asabina was elected as the Chairperson of the party. In the 2020 elections, the BEP won 2 seats. It contested in only 6 of the districts, and did not run in Nickerie, Commewijne, Coronie and Saramacca. The BEP is not part of the 2020 coalition.

== Electoral results ==
| Election | Seats won | +/– | Votes | Districts won | Government | Alliance |
|---|---|---|---|---|---|---|
| 1973 | 0 / 39 | | 3,198 | | Opposition | none |
| 1987 | Did not contest | | | | | |
| 1991 | 3 / 51 | | | | Opposition | Democratic Alternative '91 |
| 1996 | 0 / 51 | | | | Opposition | Democratic Alternative '91 |
| 2000 | 1 / 51 | ▲1 | | Brokopondo: 1 (of 3) | Opposition | Democratic Alternative '91 |
| 2005 | 4 / 51 | ▲3 | | Paramaribo: 1 (of 17) Brokopondo: 1 (of 3) Marowijne: 1 (of 3) Sipaliwini: 1 (of 4) | Coalition | A-Combination |
| 2010 | 4 / 51 | 0 | | Brokopondo: 2 (of 3) Sipaliwini: 2 (of 4) | Coalition | A-Combination |
| 2015 | 2 / 51 | ▼2 | 4,618 | Paramaribo: 1 (of 17) Sipaliwini: 1 (of 4) | Opposition | V7 |
| 2020 | 2 / 51 | 0 | 6,835 | Sipaliwini: 1 (of 4) Brokopondo: 1 (of 3) | Opposition | none |
