= Jennifer Geerlings-Simons =

President of Suriname since 2025

Her Excellency Jennifer Geerlings-Simons
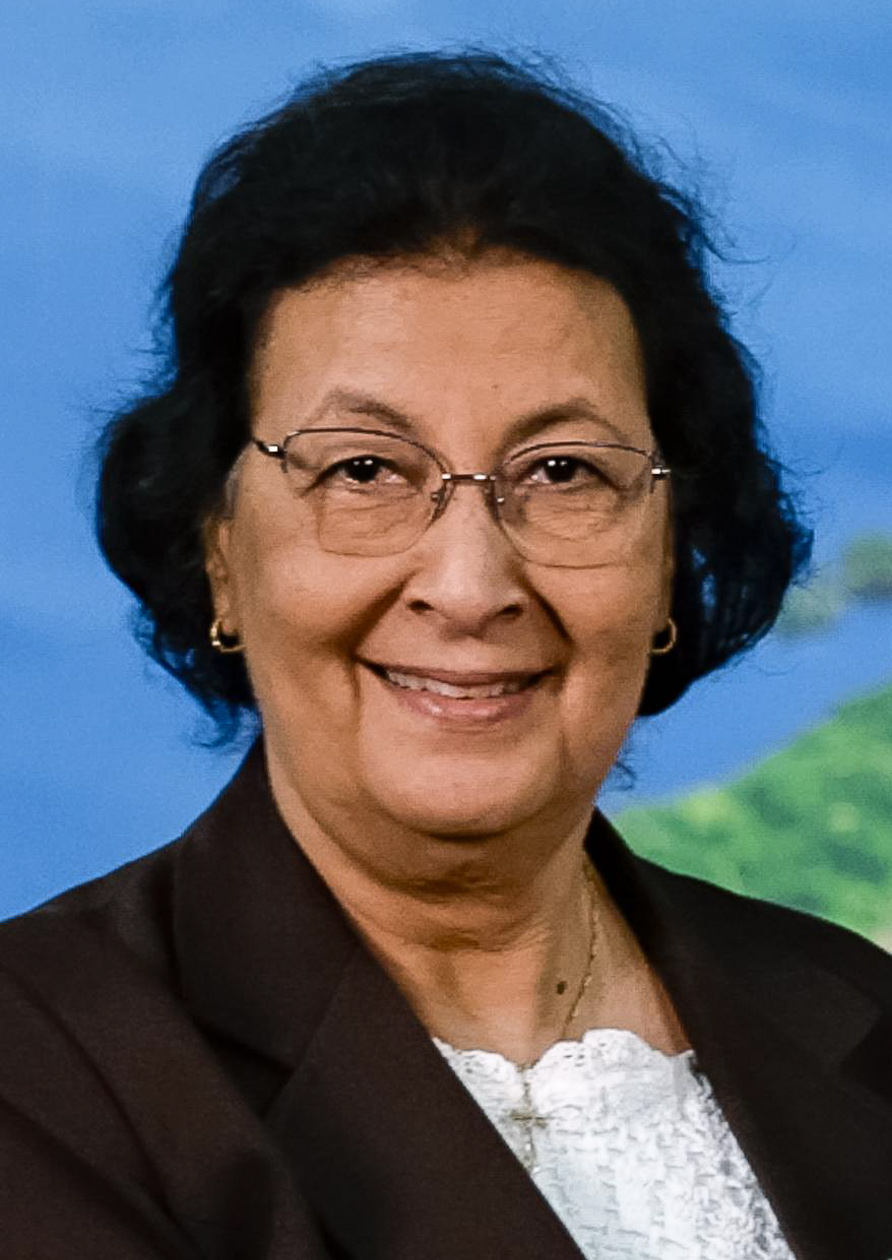
- Geerlings-Simons in 2025

10th President of Suriname
- Incumbent
- Assumed office 16 July 2025
- Vice President: Gregory Rusland
- Preceded by: Chan Santokhi

President of the National Democratic Party
- Incumbent
- Assumed office 13 July 2024
- Preceded by: Dési Bouterse

Chairperson of the National Assembly of Suriname
- In office 30 June 2010 – 28 June 2020
- Preceded by: Paul Somohardjo
- Succeeded by: Ronnie Brunswijk

Member of the National Assembly
- In office 23 May 1996 – 25 May 2020
- Constituency: Paramaribo District

Personal details
- Born: Jennifer Simons; 5 September 1953 (age 73) Paramaribo, Colony of Suriname
- Party: National Democratic Party
- Spouse: Glenn Geerlings (m. 1981)
- Children: 3
- Education: University of Suriname (Drs.)
- Profession: Physician

Jennifer Geerlings-Simons (née Simons; born 5 September 1953) is a Surinamese politician and former physician who is serving as the eleventh president of Suriname since 16 July 2025. A member of the National Democratic Party (NDP), she has been the party's president since 2024.

Geerlings-Simons began her career as a physician, working as a dermatologist, and later in the National HIV/AIDS program. In 1996, she joined politics and was elected to the National Assembly in the general elections. Shortly after the 2010 general elections, Geerlings-Simons was elected the chairperson of the National Assembly from 2010 to 2020, becoming the second female to hold this role.

In July 2024, Geerlings-Simons became the president of the National Democratic Party after the death of Dési Bouterse. The following year in May 2025, she led the party to a first-place plurality in the general election held on 25 May. Geerlings-Simons was subsequently elected President on 6 July 2025, becoming the first female president in the nation's history.

== Early life and career ==
Simons grew up in Paramaribo, as the oldest of four children. She studied medicine at the University of Suriname, graduating in 1979. After traveling to the Netherlands to specialize, she returned to practice in Suriname. Her first posting was as a country doctor for Onverwacht in Para District, a connection she later referenced in her political campaigns.

In 1983, Simons briefly worked at the Academic Hospital Paramaribo, before transferring to the Dermatology Division. She remained in this post until 2002. During this period, she also set up the National HIV/AIDS program in Suriname.

== Political career ==
Simons was first elected as a member of the National Assembly in 1996, representing the district of Paramaribo for the National Democratic Party, which was founded by Dési Bouterse. She was leader of the NDP parliamentary group from 2000 until 2006.

After the 2010 general elections, Geerlings-Simons was elected the chairperson of the National Assembly, becoming the second female to hold this role. She would hold this position until 2020. In April 2012, Simons was accused by the opposition in the parliament of dictatorial behaviour because of her decision to forbid members of the parliament from referring to the amnesty law of April 2012 during a debate on the anti-stalking law.

On 8 April 2020, Simons was appointed to lead the Parliamentary COVID-19 Crisis Management Team during the COVID-19 pandemic in Suriname.

On 20 June 2020, Simons announced her retirement from politics. She had been elected in the 2020 Surinamese general election, but ultimately decided not to take her seat. Stephen Tsang, who was on 6th place on the NDP list, subsequently became eligible for the National Assembly.

== President of Suriname (2025–present) ==
On 13 July 2024, she succeeded Dési Bouterse as the leader of the National Democratic Party. The following year, she led the NDP to first place in the general election. The NDP hammered out a coalition agreement with five other parties to support Geerlings-Simons for president. Between them, the coalition has 34 seats, exactly the two-thirds supermajority needed to make her Suriname's first female president without the support of other parties.

On 3 July, the Progressive Reform Party, which led the governing coalition, said it would not put forward a candidate against Geerlings-Simons. No one else lodged a candidacy by the deadline, assuring Geerlings-Simons' election. She was elected unopposed as president on 6 July with NPS leader Gregory Rusland as vice president. and inaugurated on 16 July 2025.

Time named President Geerlings-Simons one of the 100 most influential people in climate movement in 2025. It credits her for protecting indigenous and tribal land rights, minimizing logging and protecting the rainforests. She wants developed nations to pay more to help developing countries preserve their forests. "Sustainability cannot just be about emissions reduction," Geerlings-Simons says. "It must also mean protecting the ecosystems that regulate the climate and supporting the people who care for them."

== Personal life ==
In 1981, Simons married Glenn Geerlings. They have three children. Her eldest son died in 2015.

== Awards and honours ==
=== National honours ===
- Honorary Order of the Yellow Star, Grand Master (16 July 2025)
- Honorary Order of the Palm, Grand Master (16 July 2025)

=== Foreign honours ===
- Netherlands:
  - Knight Grand Cross of the Order of the Netherlands Lion (1 December 2025)
- United States:
  - TIME100 Climate list of the 100 most influential climate leaders (2025)
