= Chan Santokhi =

President of Suriname from 2020 to 2025

- चान संतोखी
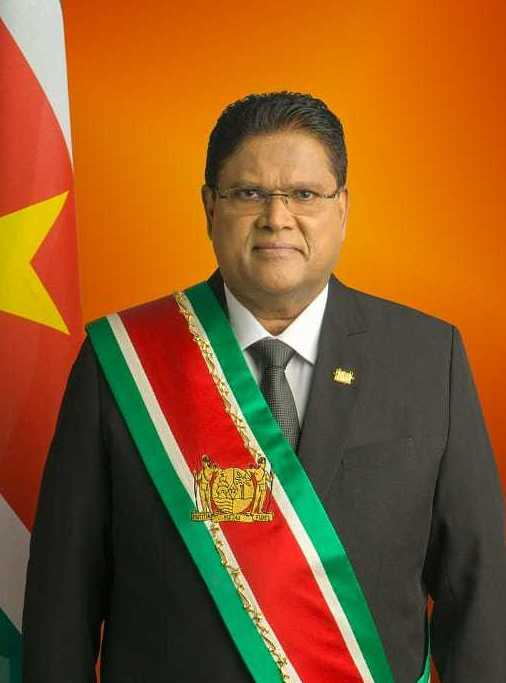
- Official portrait, 2020

9th President of Suriname
- In office 16 July 2020 – 16 July 2025
- Vice President: Ronnie Brunswijk
- Preceded by: Dési Bouterse
- Succeeded by: Jennifer Geerlings-Simons

Leader of the Progressive Reform Party
- In office 3 July 2011 – 30 March 2026
- Preceded by: Ramdien Sardjoe
- Succeeded by: vacant

Member of the National Assembly
- In office 16 July 2025 – 30 March 2026
- In office 12 August 2010 – 16 July 2020
- Constituency: Wanica District

Minister of Justice and Police
- In office 1 September 2005 – 13 August 2010
- President: Ronald Venetiaan
- Preceded by: Siegfried Gilds
- Succeeded by: Lamuré Latour (ad interim); Martin Misiedjan

Chairman of the Caribbean Community
- In office 1 July 2022 – 31 December 2022
- Preceded by: Johnny Briceño
- Succeeded by: Philip Davis

Personal details
- Born: Chandrikapersad Santokhi; 3 February 1959 Lelydorp, Suriname
- Died: 30 March 2026 (aged 67) Paramaribo, Suriname
- Party: Progressive Reform Party
- Spouse(s): Sharda Ramkisoen (divorced) Mellisa Seenacherry (m. 2020)
- Children: 2
- Education: Nederlandse Politieacademie, Apeldoorn (BS)
- Awards: Honorary Order of the Yellow Star (2010); Pravasi Bharatiya Samman (2023)
- Nickname: Sheriff

Chandrikapersad "Chan" Santokhi (Dutch: [tɕɑnˈdrikaːpɛrˌsɑt sɑnˈtɔki]; Sarnami: चंद्रिकापेर्साद संतोखी, pronounced [cⁿd̪rikɑːpərəsɑːd̪ə sⁿt̪oːkʰiː]; 3 February 1959 – 30 March 2026) was a Surinamese politician and police officer who served as the ninth president of Suriname from 2020 to 2025. After winning the 2020 elections, Santokhi was the sole nominee for president of Suriname. On 13 July, Santokhi was elected president by acclamation in an uncontested election. He was inaugurated on 16 July.

== Early life ==
Chandrikapersad Santokhi was born on 3 February 1959, into an Indo-Surinamese Hindu family in Lelydorp, in district Suriname (now known as district Wanica). He grew up in the countryside as the youngest in a family of nine children. His father worked at the harbor of Paramaribo and his mother worked as a shop assistant in Lelydorp.

== Career ==
=== Police career ===
After Santokhi obtained his VWO diploma at the Algemene Middelbare School in Paramaribo, he received a scholarship to study in the Netherlands. From 1978 till 1982, he studied at the Police Academy of the Netherlands in Apeldoorn. After completing his study he returned to Suriname in September 1982, to work for the police. From the age of 23, Santokhi worked as a police inspector in Geyersvlijt and Wanica until he was appointed in 1989 as head of the national criminal investigation department. In 1991, he was appointed commissioner of police.

=== Minister of Justice ===
In September 2005, Santokhi was sworn in as Minister of Justice and Police on behalf of the Progressive Reform Party. His period in office was marked by a heavy crackdown on crime, in particular drug trafficking, and a strict, no-nonsense enforcement of law and order. This earned him the nickname sheriff, which he got from Dési Bouterse.

=== December murders trial ===
As police commissioner, Santokhi led the investigation of the December murders that happened at the start of his ministership so that the December murders trial could finally commence. For the exclusive purpose of the December murders trial, he had a heavily secured courtroom built in Domburg, Wanica. Because Santokhi was the driving force behind the trial, he became a much-discussed matter of the main suspect in that trial, Dési Bouterse. Bouterse said on 26 November 2007, four days before the commencement of the trial, that Santokhi wanted to "imprison and kill him". Bouterse alleged that numerous previous attempts to "take him out" all failed and warned Santokhi to be cautious with his "intentions to eliminate Bouterse". On 29 November 2019, the Court of Appeal reached a verdict in the December murders trial, and Bouterse was sentenced to 20 years' imprisonment.

On 10 September 2008, Santokhi sued Bouterse for insult, slander and defamation, because Bouterse had alleged that Santokhi had ties to drug dealers and other criminals. On 23 September 2008, the court ruled that Bouterse's allegations were unproven, ordered Bouterse to publish a rectification, and a penalty payment of SRD 100,000 for each day Bouterse failed to execute the sentence. The same day, Bouterse placed a rectification in De West where he admitted that the statements were untrue.

=== 2010 general election ===
In the 2010 Surinamese general election, Santokhi received the highest number of votes after Bouterse, despite being placed relatively low on the party list of the Progressive Reform Party. In July of that year, he was appointed presidential candidate on behalf of the ruling political alliance New Front for Democracy and Development. Santokhi's opponent in the presidential elections was Bouterse. Since Bouterse (NDP) cooperated with Ronnie Brunswijk (ABOP) and Paul Somohardjo (PL), his political alliance had a total of 36 seats, while the New Front only took fourteen. Consequently, Bouterse was elected the eighth President of Suriname.

=== President of CICAD ===
Santokhi, who for fifteen years was the official representative of the Inter-American Drug Abuse Control Commission (CICAD), was chosen on 6 December 2010, as president of this organization for one year. CICAD is an autonomous body of the Organization of American States, that coordinates the drug policy of the Western Hemisphere. In 2009, Santokhi was, also for one year, the vice-president of this organization.

=== Chairman of the Progressive Reform Party ===
On 3 July 2011, Santokhi was elected as chairman of the Vooruitstrevende Hervormings Partij (VHP) (Progressive Reform Party). The Progressive Reform Party, which was once an Indo-Surinamese party, has grown, since the appointment of Santokhi as chairman, into a multi-ethnic party which, according to current statistics, is the second-biggest political party in Suriname. With eight seats in the parliament, the VHP was the biggest opposition party until 2020.

=== President of Suriname ===
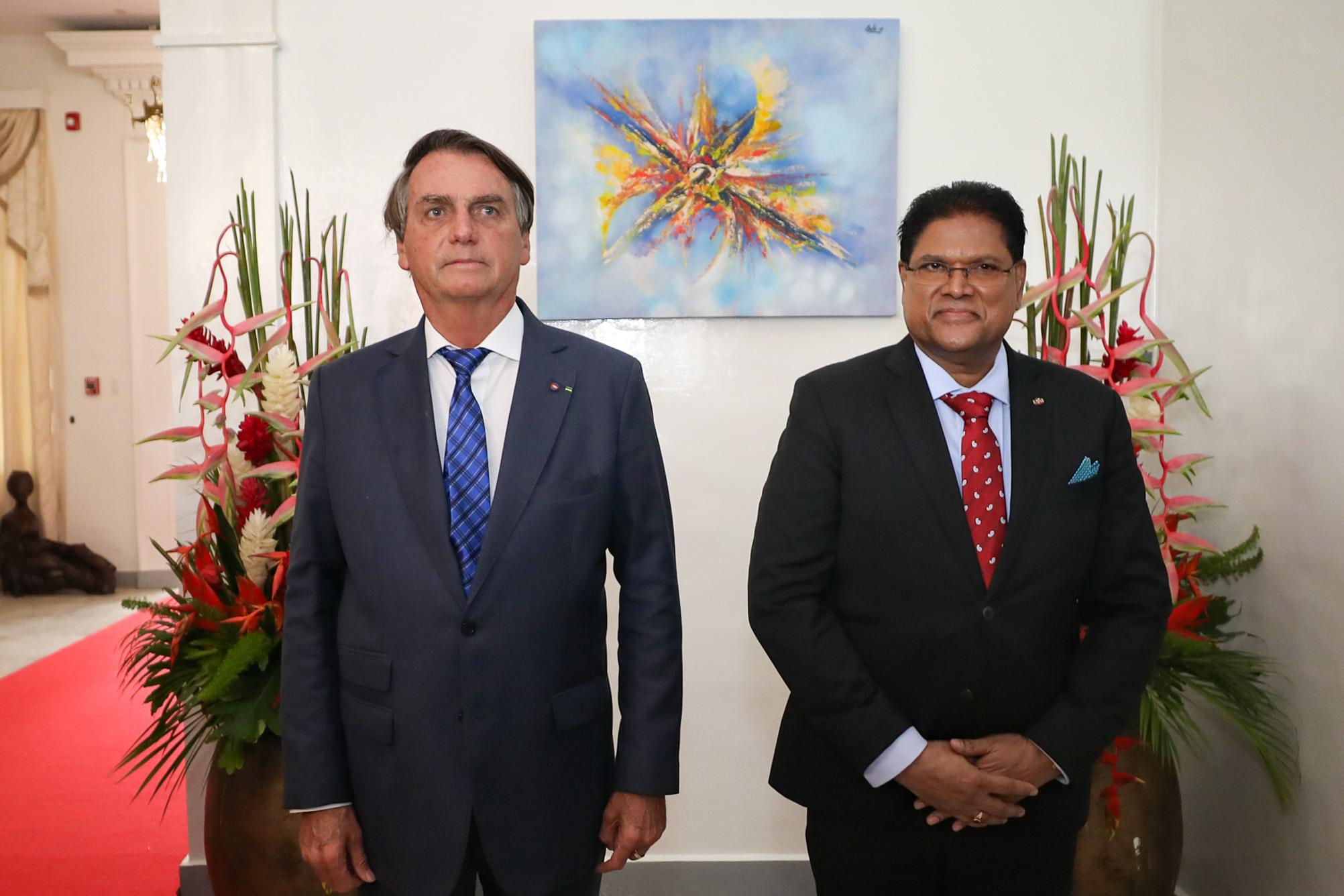
Santokhi with Brazilian President Jair Bolsonaro in January 2022

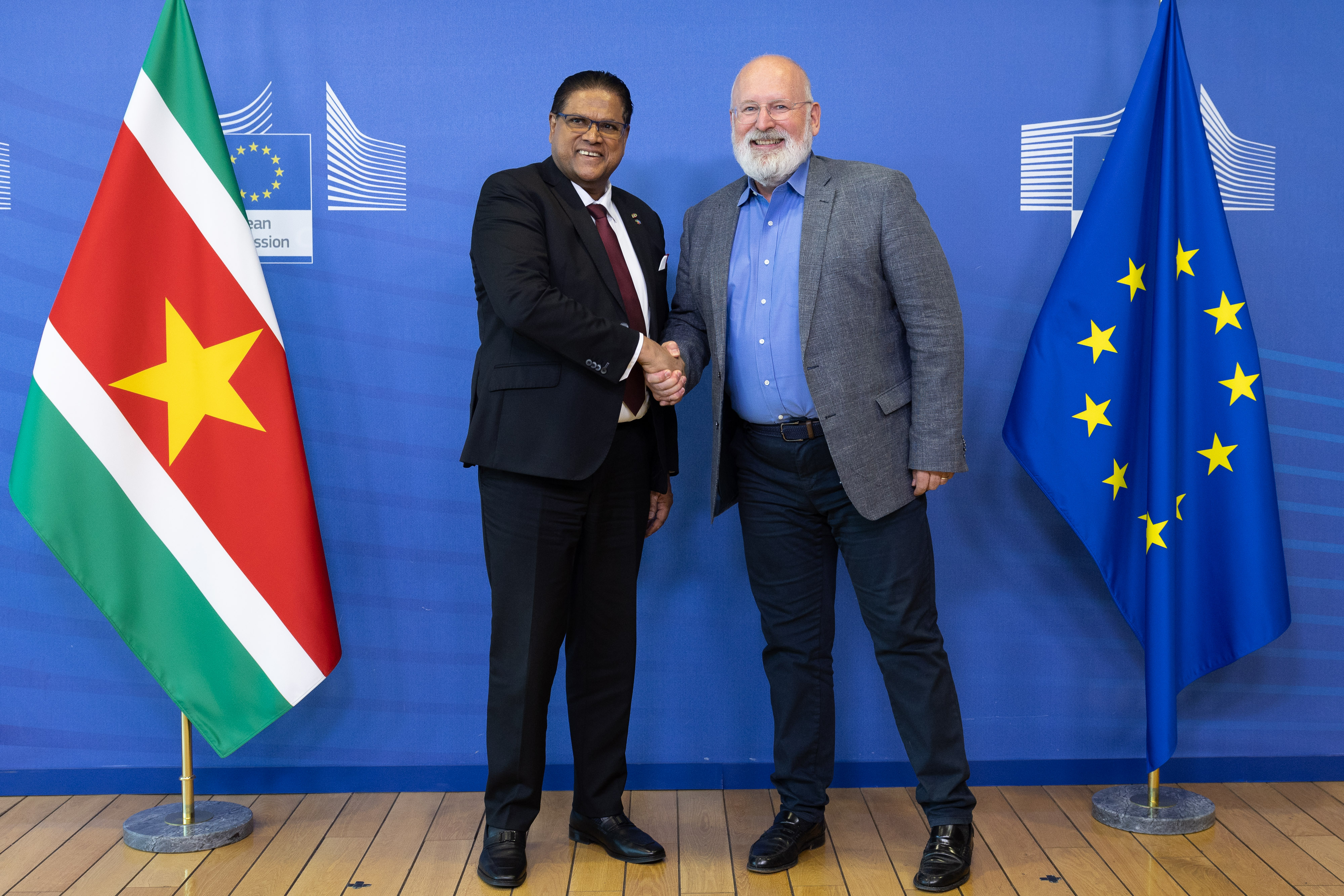
Santokhi with European Commissioner Frans Timmermans in July 2023

On 26 May 2020, the preliminary results of the 2020 Surinamese general election showed that the VHP was the largest party, and that Chan Santokhi was the most likely candidate to become the ninth President of Suriname. On 30 May, Chan Santokhi announced his candidacy for President of Suriname. On 29 June, the VHP nominated Chan Santokhi as their candidate for the Presidency. On 7 July, the coalition nominated Chan Santokhi as president and Ronnie Brunswijk as Vice President. No other candidates had been nominated on 8 July 2020, 15:00 (UTC−3), and on 13 July, Santokhi was elected as president by acclamation in an uncontested election. He was inaugurated on 16 July, on the Onafhankelijkheidsplein in Paramaribo in a ceremony without the public invited, due to the COVID-19 pandemic. He took his oath reciting Hindu Sanskrit shlokas and mantras in his oath ceremony. Santokhi's inauguration was also blessed by several Christian religious leaders.

In September 2021, Santokhi visited the Netherlands and became the first Surinamese president to do so since 2008, after diplomatic relations between the two countries had cooled down. Prime Minister of the Netherlands Mark Rutte referred to the rapprochement as "historic".

Following the May 2025 general election, Santokhi returned to parliament as leader of the opposition.

== Personal life ==
On 19 July 2020, Chan Santokhi married his long-term partner, Mellisa Seenacherry. The marriage took place in a private ceremony. Mellisa is a lawyer by profession. He also had two adult children (a daughter and a son) from a previous marriage.

=== Death ===
Santokhi died on 30 March 2026, at the age of 67. Earlier that day, an ambulance was called to Santokhi's home in Paramaribo due to a medical emergency, but they were unable to save his life at the hospital.

== Awards and honours ==
=== National honours ===
- Honorary Order of the Yellow Star, Grand Master (July 2010 as Grand Officer)
- Honorary Order of the Palm, Grand Master (16 July 2020)

=== Foreign honours ===
  (India)
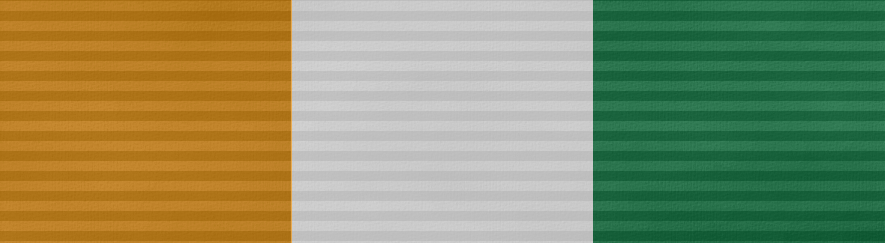
  - Pravasi Bharatiya Samman (9 January 2021)

Political offices
Preceded by Siegfried Gilds	Minister of Justice and Police; 2005–2010	Succeeded by Martin Misiedjan
Preceded by Dési Bouterse	President of Suriname; 2020–2025	Succeeded by Jennifer Geerlings-Simons
Party political offices
Preceded by Ram Sardjoe	Leader of the Progressive Reform Party; 2011–2026	Succeeded by TBD
Diplomatic posts
Preceded by Johnny Briceño	Chairman of the Caribbean Community; 2022	Succeeded by Philip Davis
