= Democracy and Development through Unity =

Political party in Suriname

Democracy and Development in Unity Democratie en Ontwikkeling in Eenheid
- Leader: Steven Alfaisi
- Founded: 2 December 1999
- Ideology: Reformism; Populism
- National affiliation: A-Combination (formerly)
- National Assembly: 0 / 51

Website
- https://doesuriname.com/

Democracy and Development in Unity (Dutch: Democratie en Ontwikkeling in Eenheid) is a political party in Suriname. The party identifies as reformist, and was founded on 2 December 1999.

The party's by-laws state that its board will be composed of 50% women and it will strive for equal numbers of men and women in all positions, the only party in the country to do so.

The party had one seat in the National Assembly from 2010 to 2020, held by its then-leader Carl Breeveld. In the 2020 Surinamese general election, the party did not get any seats.
