= National Democratic Party (Suriname) =

Political party in Suriname

National Democratic Party Nationale Democratische Partij
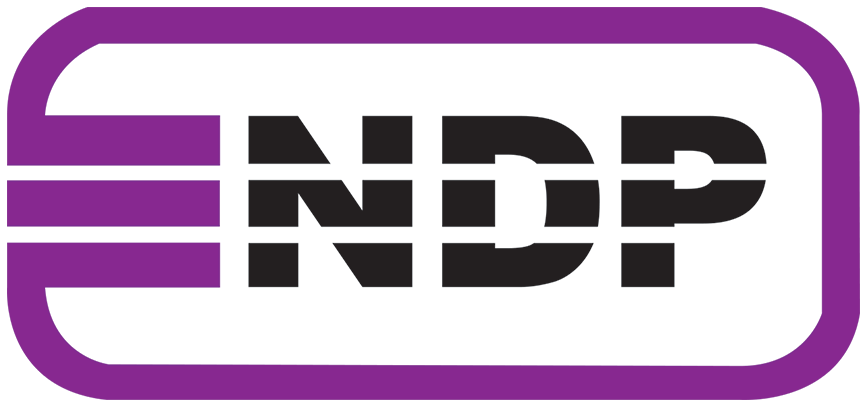
- Abbreviation: NDP
- President: Jennifer Geerlings-Simons
- Founder: Dési Bouterse
- Founded: 4 July 1987
- Preceded by: 25th of February Movement
- Ideology: Nationalism
- Political position: Centre-left; Historical: Left-wing
- National affiliation: Megacombinatie (formerly)
- Seats in the National Assembly: 18 / 51

Website
- www.ndpsuriname.com

The National Democratic Party (Dutch: Nationale Democratische Partij, NDP) is a political party in Suriname. It was founded on 4 July 1987 by Surinamese leader Dési Bouterse, and was one of the first parties in the country to have a stable base of support across different ethnic groups.

== History ==
The NDP was formed from a reorganisation of the Vijfentwintig Februari Beweging (VFB, February Twenty-Fifth Movement), a political movement established on 24 November 1983 by Dési Bouterse and the ruling military junta.

The NDP was the first political party in Suriname to have a website. It was set up for the 1996 election campaign.

NDP chairman Bouterse was elected President of Suriname on 19 July 2010, after he won the 2010 elections with his Mega Combination of which the NDP was the dominant party. The party won the 2015 elections as well, scoring 45.56% of the vote and 26 of 51 seats in parliament against an alliance of 7 (later 6) opposition parties.

In the 2020 elections, the NDP won 16 of the 51 seats. Dési Bouterse lost the presidency and he was succeeded by opposition leader Chan Santokhi. The opposition parties formed a new coalition government. The NDP subsequently became the main opposition party.

The NDP returned to power in 2025 as the senior partner in a coalition government, with Bouterse's successor as party leader, Jennifer Geerlings-Simons, elected president.

== Electoral results ==
Election	Votes	+/– votes	% of votes	No. of overall seats won	+/– seats	% of seats	Districts won	Government	Notes
1987	16,000	new	9%	3 / 51	▲3	5%		Opposition	
1991	34,429	▲18,429	22%	12 / 51	▲8	23%		Opposition	
1996	45,466	▲11,037	26%	16 / 51	▲4	31%		Coalition	
2000	27,657	▼17,809	15%	7 / 51	▼9	13%		Opposition	Millenium Combinatie alliance
2005	48,879	▲21,222	23%	15 / 51	▲8	29%		Opposition	
2010	95,543	▲46,664	40%	18 / 51	▲4	37%		Coalition	Mega Combinatie alliance
2015	117,205	▲21,662	45%	26 / 51	▲7	50%	Paramaribo: 10 (of 17); Wanica: 3 (of 7); Para: 3 (of 3); Nickerie: 2 (of 5); Sipaliwini: 2 (of 4); Commewijne: 2 (of 4; Brokopondo: 2 (of 3); Saramacca: 1 (of 3); Marowijne: 1 (of 3); Coronie: 1 (of 2)	Majority	
2020	65,862	▼51,343	24%	16 / 51	▼10	31%	Paramaribo: 5 (of 17) ▼5; Para: 2 (of 3) ▼1; Coronie: 2 (of 2); Wanica: 1 (of 7) ▼2; Nickerie: 1 (of 5) ▼1; Sipaliwini: 1 (of 4) ▼1; Commewijne: 1 (of 4 ▼1; Marowijne: 1 (of 3); Brokopondo: 1 (of 3) ▼1; Saramacca: 1 (of 3)	Opposition	
2025	90,432	▲24,570	34.1%	18 / 51	▲2	35%	Paramaribo: 6 (of 17); Wanica: 3 (of 7); Para: 2 (of 3); Nickerie: 2 (of 5); Sipaliwini: 2 (of 4); Commewijne: 1 (of 4); Brokopondo: 1 (of 3); Saramacca: 1 (of 3); Marowijne: 1 (of 3); Coronie: 1 (of 2)	Coalition	
