= Ronnie Brunswijk =

Surinamese politician and former rebel (born 1961)

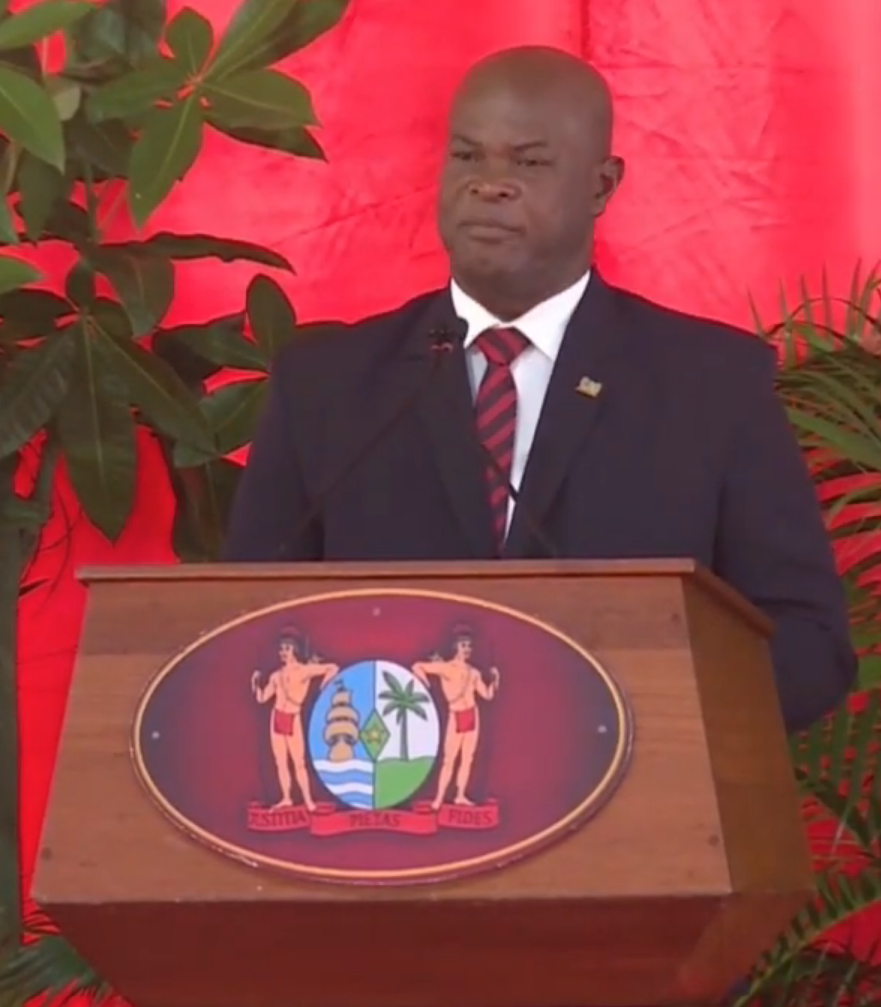
- Brunswijk in 2020

Vice Chair of the National Assembly
- Incumbent
- Assumed office 28 June 2025
- President: Jennifer Geerlings-Simons
- Preceded by: Dew Sharman

8th Vice President of Suriname
- In office 16 July 2020 – 16 July 2025
- President: Chan Santokhi
- Preceded by: Ashwin Adhin
- Succeeded by: Gregory Rusland

Chairman of the National Assembly of Suriname
- In office 29 June 2020 – 14 July 2020
- Preceded by: Jennifer Simons
- Succeeded by: Marinus Bee

Member of the National Assembly
- Incumbent
- Assumed office 2005
- Constituency: Marowijne District

Leader of the General Liberation and Development Party
- Incumbent
- Assumed office 11 February 1990
- Preceded by: Party established

Personal details
- Born: 7 March 1961 (age 65) Moiwana, Suriname
- Party: General Liberation and Development Party
- Spouse: Beatrix Esajas (divorced)
- Domestic partner: Adolfina 'Fine' Cairo
- Children: Damian, Elton, Pascal, and Yoni
- Website: The National Assembly
Association football career
- Position: Midfielder
Team information
- Current team: Inter Moengotapoe (captain)
- Number: 61
Senior career*
Years	Team	Apps	(Gls)
1987–2011	Inter Moengotapoe	3	(0)
2021–	Inter Moengotapoe	1	(0)
Managerial career
- 2002–2011: Inter Moengotapoe (player-owner)
- 2011–2021: Inter Moengotapoe (owner)
- 2021–: Inter Moengotapoe (player-owner)
- * Club domestic league appearances and goals

Ronnie Brunswijk (Dutch pronunciation: [ˈrɔni ˈbrʏnsʋɛik]; born 7 March 1961) is a Surinamese politician, businessman, former rebel leader and footballer, who served as the Vice President of Suriname from 2020 to 2025.

Brunswijk served as the personal bodyguard of military dictator Dési Bouterse in the early 1980s, but was discharged after asking for a raise, and denied back pay. In 1985, he formed the Surinamese Liberation Army, better known as the Jungle Commando. Brunswijk sought to gain recognition and rights for the Maroon minority of the interior, descendants of runaway African slaves who had established independent communities in the 17th and 18th centuries. From 1986, his forces fought against the national military under Bouterse in the Surinamese Interior War, a civil war that resulting in hundreds of deaths and more than 10,000 refugees in French Guiana, until a peace treaty was signed in 1992.

Brunswijk remained active in politics, serving as chair of the General Liberation and Development Party (Algemene Bevrijdings- en Ontwikkelingspartij, ABOP), and as a representative in the National Assembly. In addition he is the owner of Marowijne football club Inter Moengotapoe, which he has also appeared for as a player. On 29 June 2020, Brunswijk became Chairperson of the National Assembly of Suriname.

On 13 July 2020, Brunswijk was elected vice-president by acclamation in an uncontested election. He was inaugurated on 16 July 2020.

== Biography ==
Ronnie Brunswijk joined the Suriname National Army at the age of 18. He was considered a good soldier, and was sent to Cuba for commando training. After finishing his training, he was appointed as a personal bodyguard of Desi Bouterse. During a state visit to Nickerie a gunshot was fired. Brunswijk immediately rushed forward to protect the President. Later it was discovered that a soldier in the honorary guard had fired his weapon by accident. In 1984, Brunswijk asked for a raise, but was discharged instead on 16 April, and refused back pay by Major Paul Bhagwandas.

The Surinamese Interior War started in Stolkertsijver on 22 July 1986 at around 03:00. 12 soldiers guarding the checkpoint were captured by the Jungle Commando headed by Brunswijk. In 1986, Brunswijk was sentenced in absentia for a bank robbery in Moengo on 26 April. Said bank robbery, a non-violent offence, earned Ronnie Brunswijk the title "Robin Hood of Suriname" due to his liberation of stolen funds from government held institutions that were returned to the people. During the war, the Jungle Commando received arms and funding from the Netherlands, and Dutch Colonel Bas van Tussenbroek was moved to French Guiana to transfer funds, and serve as military advisor.

=== Moiwana massacre ===
On 29 November 1986, the Surinamese army took revenge by attacking Brunswijk's birth village of Moiwana, where they murdered at least 39 villagers, mostly women and children. They burned down Brunswijk's house and destroyed the village. More than 100 refugees fled across the border to French Guiana, which became a destination for other refugees as the war wore on. The Inter-American Court of Human Rights ordered the government to pay millions of US dollars in compensation to the 130 survivors of the village attack.

=== Post-war activities ===
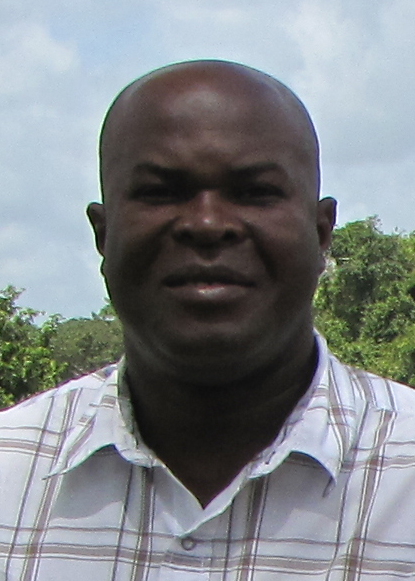
Brunswijk in 2011

The government and Brunswijk negotiated a ceasefire on 21 July 1989 in Kourou that included conversion of the Jungle Commando to a regular part of the Surinamese Army, with responsibility for patrolling their traditional interior territory. The government also promised jobs for Maroons in gold prospecting and forestry, as they were isolated from many developing industries. On 8 August 1992, a final peace treaty was signed.

The Netherlands prosecuted both Brunswijk and Bouterse in absentia for drug trafficking, and both men were convicted. Brunswijk was convicted in absentia in the Netherlands to eight years imprisonment for cocaine smuggling by a Dutch court in Haarlem despite numerous witnesses contesting the claims. Brunswijk appealed the ruling pursuant to insufficient evidence. In 2000, he was convicted to six years on appeal. There is as of July 2020, an Interpol arrest warrant against him.

Brunswijk is chairman of the Surinamese political party General Liberation and Development Party (Algemene Bevrijdings- en Ontwikkelingspartij, ABOP).

In December 2007, Brunswijk and Paul Somohardjo assaulted Rashied Doekhi, a member of Desi Bouterse's party, in the Surinamese parliament after Doekhi assaulted Brunswijk and Somohardjo, then chair of the Surinamese parliament. The event was broadcast on live television.

Brunswijk was owner of Robruns NV, a gold mining company. According to a Parbode, Brunswijk owned six gold concessions in 2012. In July 2020, Brunswijk transferred ownership of the gold concessions to a foundation in order to qualify for the Vice Presidency.

=== 2020 elections ===
Brunswijk was elected to the National Assembly in the 2020 elections. He was elected as Chairman of the National Assembly of Suriname on 29 June 2020, in an uncontested election. Dew Sharman was elected as Vice Chairman. Brunswijk subsequently ran for vice president, and on 8 July, Brunswijk announced that he will be succeeded by Marinus Bee as Chairman of the National Assembly who was installed on 14 July. Brunswijk was the shortest serving chairman in the history of Suriname.

On 1 July 2020, Brunswijk tested COVID-19 positive. He had been tested, because Paul Somohardjo with whom he had lengthy meetings about the new government tested positive. He was released from hospital on 6 July. To show his appreciation for the hospital staff, he donated three cars to nurses who did not have transportation.

On 7 July, the coalition nominated Chan Santokhi as President of Suriname and Ronnie Brunswijk as Vice-president. No other candidates were nominated, and therefore Brunswijk was elected as vice president on 13 July by acclamation in an uncontested election. Brunswijk was inaugurated as vice president on 16 July on the Onafhankelijkheidsplein in Paramaribo in ceremony without public due to the COVID-19 pandemic.

== Football career ==
=== Administration ===
Brunswijk is also a player and owner of Marowijne football club Inter Moengotapoe. In 2002, Brunswijk built a football stadium in Moengo, which he named the Ronnie Brunswijkstadion. The disciplinary committee of the Surinamese Football Association suspended him for five years because he threatened some players with a handgun during a match in 2005. The suspension was retracted due to lack of evidence. In June 2012, Brunswijk was suspended for one year because he behaved violently towards the referee and a player in football match.

=== Playing career ===
On 21 September 2021, Brunswijk played for Inter Moengotapoe (the club he owns) as a starter in the first leg of a round of 16 fixture in the 2021 CONCACAF League against Honduran side C.D. Olimpia. He played for 54 minutes and completed 14 of the 17 attempted passes before he was replaced in the second half during the 6–0 home loss. He made history by becoming the oldest player to play in an international club competition, at 60 years and 198 days old. He donned the number 61 jersey as a tribute to the year he was born and captained the team during the match. He played together with his son Damian Brunswijk in the first half of the game.

Brunswijk made international headlines for playing in the match. Following the match, video leaked online that showed Brunswijk paying Olimpia players after the match, suspecting pundits that Brunswijk engaged in match fixing. On 22 September 2021, CONCACAF launched a formal investigation. Three days later, the federation announced the investigation had found "serious breaches of integrity rules", with both clubs being disqualified from the tournament and Brunswijk being banned from "participating in any capacity in CONCACAF competitions" for three years as a result.

On October 31st, 2026, Brunswijk would convert a penalty to get his first career goal against Politie Voetbal Vrienden. Inter Moengotapoe would later win the game 5-0.

== Personal life ==
Brunswijk's nephew, Clyde Brunswijk, is a professional kickboxer. Steven Brunswijk, a Dutch comedian and television personality, is a cousin.

Party political offices
New political party	Leader of the General Liberation and Development Party; 1990–present	Incumbent
Political offices
Preceded by Jennifer Simons	Chairman of the National Assembly of Suriname; 2020	Succeeded by Marinus Bee
Preceded by Ashwin Adhin	Vice President of Suriname; 2020–2025	Succeeded by Gregory Rusland
