= 2020 in the Caribbean =

The following lists events that happened during 2020 in The Caribbean.

== Sovereign states ==
=== Cuba ===
Cuba declared its independence from the United States on May 20, 1902.

- First Secretary of the Central Committee of the Communist Party of Cuba: Raúl Castro (since April 19, 2011)
- President of Cuba: Miguel Díaz-Canel (since October 19, 2019)
  - Vice-President: Salvador Valdés Mesa (since October 19, 2019)
- Prime Minister: Manuel Marrero Cruz (since December 19, 2019)

=== Dominica ===
Dominica declared its independence from the United Kingdom on November 3, 1978.

- President: Charles Savarin (October 2, 2013 - October 2, 2023)
- Prime Minister: Roosevelt Skerrit (since August 8, 2004)

=== Dominican Republic ===
Dominican Republic declared its independence from Haiti on February 27, 1844.

- President of the Dominican Republic
  - Danilo Medina (August 16, 2012 – July 16, 2020)
  - Luis Abinader (starting July 16, 2020)
- Vice-President
  - Margarita Cedeño de Fernández (August 16, 2012 – July 16, 2020)
  - Raquel Peña de Antuña (starting July 16, 2020)

=== Guyana ===
Co-operative Republic of Guyana gained its independence in 1966. It is a member of the Caribbean Community (CARICOM), Commonwealth of Nations (Commonwealth), and the Union of South American Nations (USAN). The capital and chief port of Guyana is Georgetown. (Note: Guyana has a border dispute with Suriname, which claims the area east of the left bank of the Corentyne River and the New River in southwestern Suriname. Suriname claims the Tigri Area.) (Note: Guyana And Venezuela both claim land west of the Essequibo River. Venezuela and Guyana also dispute Ankoko Island.)

- President of Guyana
  - David A. Granger (May 16, 2015 – August 2, 2020)
  - Irfaan Ali (since August 2, 2020) (Note: An election is scheduled in 2020.)
- Prime Minister
  - Moses Nagamootoo (May 16, 2015 – August 2, 2020)
  - Mark Phillips (since August 2, 2020)

=== Haiti ===
Haiti declared its Independence from France on January 1, 1804. Its capital is Port-au-Prince.

- President of Haiti: Jovenel Moïse (since February 7, 2017)
- Acting Prime Minister: Fritz-William Michel (since July 22, 2019)

=== Suriname ===
Previously known as Dutch Guiana, which gained its independence on 25 November 1975. The Republic of Suriname is a member of CARICOM. The capital is Paramaribo. (Note: Suriname is a border dispute with Guyana, which claims the area east of the left bank of the Corentyne River and the New River in southeastern Suriname. Guyana claims the Tigri Area.)

- President of Suriname
  - Dési Bouterse (August 12, 2010 – July 16, 2020)
  - Chan Santokhi (since July 16, 2020)
- Vice President of Suriname
  - Ashwin Adhin (August 12, 2015 – July 16, 2020)
  - Ronnie Brunswijk (since 16 July 2020)

=== Trinidad and Tobago ===
Trinidad and Tobago became independent on August 31, 1962. and a republic on August 1, 1976.

- President of Trinidad and Tobago: Paula-Mae Weekes (since March 19, 2008)
- Prime minister of Trinidad and Tobago: Keith Rowley (since September 9, 2015)

== Commonwealth Realms ==
(United Kingdom) Monarch: Queen Elizabeth II (since February 6, 1952)

=== Antigua and Barbuda ===
Antigua and Barbuda became an independent state within the Commonwealth in 1981.

- Governor-General of Antigua and Barbuda: Rodney Williams (since August 14, 2014)
- Prime Minister: Gaston Browne (since June 13, 2014)

=== The Bahamas ===
The Bahamas are in the Atlantic Ocean and are part of the West Indies not part of the Caribbean, although the United Nations groups them with the Caribbean. They became independent from the United Kingdom in 1973.

- Governor-General of the Bahamas: Cornelius A. Smith (since June 28, 2019)
- Prime Minister of the Bahamas: Hubert Minnis (since May 11, 2017)

=== Barbados ===
Barbados became independent from the United Kingdom in 1966.

- Governor-General of Barbados: Sandra Mason (since January 8, 2018)
- Prime minister of Barbados: Mia Mottley (since May 25, 2018)

=== Belize ===
Britain granted British Honduras self-government in 1964; on June 1, 1973, it was renamed Belize. Independence was achieved on September 21, 1981. The capital is Belmopan.

- Chief of state: Queen Elizabeth II (since 6 February 1952)
- Represented by Governor-General Sir Colville Young (since 17 November 1993)
- Head of Government: Prime Minister Dean Barrow (since 8 February 2008)
  - Deputy Prime Minister Patrick Faber (since 7 June 2016)

=== Grenada ===
Grenada became independent from the United Kingdom in 1974.

- Governor-General of Grenada: Cécile La Grenade (since May 7, 2013)
- Prime Minister: Keith Mitchell (since February 20, 2013)

=== Jamaica ===
Jamaica became independent in 1962.

- Governor-General of Jamaica: Patrick Allen (since February 26, 2009)
- Prime Minister of Jamaica: Andrew Holness (since March 3, 2016)

=== Saint Kitts and Nevis ===
Saint Kitts and Nevis achieved independence in 1983.

- Governor-General of Saint Kitts and Nevis: Tapley Seaton (since May 19, 2015)
- Prime Minister: Timothy Harris (since February 18, 2018)
  - Deputy Prime Minister: Shawn Richards (since February 22, 2015)

=== Saint Lucia ===
Saint Lucia gained independence in 1979.

- Governor-General of Saint Lucia: Neville Cenac (since January 12, 2018)
- Prime Minister: Allen Chastanet (since June 7, 2016)

=== Saint Vincent and the Grenadines ===
Independence was granted to Saint Vincent and the Grenadines in 1979.

- Governor-General of Saint Vincent and the Grenadines: Susan Dougan (since August 1, 2019)
- Prime Minister: Ralph Gonsalves (since March 28, 2001)

== Dependencies ==
=== British overseas territories ===
(United Kingdom) Head of the Commonwealth: Queen Elizabeth II

==== Anguilla ====
Anguilla was a British dependency along with Saint Kitts and Nevis until 1971. Anguilla become a separate British dependency in 1980.

- Governor of Anguilla: Tim Foy (since 2017)
  - Deputy Governor: Perin A. Bradley
- Premier of Anguilla: Victor Banks (since May 14, 2019)

==== Bermuda ====
Bermuda is located in the Atlantic Ocean and is included in the UN geoscheme for North America. Bermuda is an overseas territory of the United Kingdom.

- Governor of Bermuda: John Rankin (since December 5, 2016)
- Premier: Edward David Burt (since July 19, 2017)

==== British Virgin Islands ====
The British Virgin Islands is a British overseas territory granted autonomy in 1967.

- Governor of the Virgin Islands: Augustus Jaspert (since August 22, 2017)
  - Deputy Governor of the British Virgin Islands: David Archer
- Premier: Andrew Fahie (since February 26, 2019)

==== Cayman Islands ====
The Cayman Islands became a territory within the West Indies Federation in 1959; it remained a British dependency after the federation's breakup in 1962.

- Governor of the Cayman Islands: Martyn Roper (since October 29, 2018)
- Premier: Alden McLaughlin (since May 29, 2013)

==== Montserrat ====
Montserrat is a self-governing overseas territory of the United Kingdom.

- Governor of Montserrat: Andrew Pearce (since February 1, 2018)
- Premier: Easton Taylor-Farrell (since November 19, 2019)

==== Turks and Caicos Islands ====
Turks and Caicos Islands are located in the Atlantic Ocean, although the United Nations groups them with the Caribbean. Turks and Caicos Islands are a British overseas territory.

- Governor Nigel Dakin (since July 15, 2019)
- Premier: Sharlene Cartwright-Robinson (since December 20, 2016); she is the first female Premier of Turks and Caicos

=== Colombia ===
Colombia declared its independence from Spain on July 20, 1810.

- President of Colombia: Iván Duque Márquez (since August 7, 2018)
  - Vice-President: Marta Lucía Ramírez (since August 7, 2018)

The Archipelago of San Andrés, Providencia and Santa Catalina is a Department of Colombia and is part of South America.

- Governor: Everth Hawkins Sjogreen (since 2019)

=== France ===
(France)

- President: Emmanuel Macron (since May 14, 2017)
- Prime Minister: Édouard Philippe (since May 15, 2017)

==== French Guiana ====
French Guiana is overseas territorial collectivity of France. The capital is Cayenne.

- President of the Regional Council: Rodolphe Alexandre (since January 26, 2010)

==== Guadeloupe ====
Guadeloupe is an Overseas department and region of France.

- Governor: Philippe Gustin (since May 28, 2018)

==== Martinique ====
Martinique is an overseas department of France.

- President of the Assembly of Martinique:Claude Lise (since December 18, 2015)

==== Saint Barthélemy ====
Since 2007 Saint Barthélemy has been an overseas collectivity of France since 2007 and since 2012 it has been an overseas territory of the European Union.

- President of Territorial Council: Bruno Magras (since July 16, 2007)

==== Saint Martin ====
(Collectivity of Saint Martin) In 2003, the people of Saint Martin voted to secede from Guadeloupe; in 2007, the northern part of the island became a French overseas collectivity. In 2010, the southern half of the island became the independent country of Sint Maarten within the Kingdom of the Netherlands.

- Prefect Anne Laubies (since June 8, 2015)
- President of Territorial Council Daniel Gibbs (since 2 April 2, 2017)
  - First Vice President Valerie Damaseua (since April 2, 2017)

=== Kingdom of the Netherlands ===
(Netherlands) Monarch: King Willem-Alexander (since April 30, 2013)

==== Aruba ====
Aruba became a semi-autonomous country of the Kingdom of the Netherlands in 1986.

- Governor of Aruba: Alfonso Boekhoudt (since January 1, 2017)
- Prime Minister: Evelyn Wever-Croes (since May 31, 2018)

==== Curaçao ====
Curaçao has been a constituent Kingdom of the Netherlands since October 2010.

- Governor of Curaçao: Lucille George-Wout (since November 4, 2013)
- Prime Minister: Eugene Rhuggenaath

==== Sint Maarten ====
Sint Maarten became a self-governing constituent Kingdom of the Netherlands in October 2010.

- Governor of Sint Maarten: Eugene Holiday (since October 10, 2010)
- Prime minister of Sint Maarten: Silveria Jacobs (November 19, 2019 to January 15, 2020; interim Prime Minister since January 16, 2020)

==== Caribbean Netherlands ====
Bonaire, Sint Eustatius, and (Saba (island)) Saba became special municipalities in the Caribbean Netherlands in October 2010. The Sint Eustatius island council (governing body) was dissolved and replaced by a government commissioner in February 2018.

=== United States ===
The United States became independent on July 4, 1776.

- President: Donald Trump (since January 20, 2017)
  - Vice-President: Mike Pence (since January 20, 2017)

==== Puerto Rico ====
Puerto Rico is an unincorporated organized Territory of the United States.

- Governor of Puerto Rico: Wanda Vázquez Garced (since August 7, 2019)
- Resident Commissioner of Puerto Rico: Jenniffer González (since January 3, 2017)

==== United States Virgin Islands ====
- The United States Virgin Islands is a Territory of the United States.
- Governor: Albert Bryan (since January 7, 2019)
  - Lt. Governor: Tregenza Roach (since January 7, 2019)

=== Venezuela ===
Venezuela declared its independence from Spain on July 7, 1811. (Note: Nueva Esparta is a state of Venezuela and is part of South America.) (Note: The Federal Dependencies of Venezuela encompass most of the Caribbean islands off the coast of Venezuela except Nueva Sparta.) (Note: Venezuela disputes land west of the Essequibo River with Guyana. Venezuela and Guyana also dispute Ankoko Island.)

- President
  - Nicolás Maduro (since April 19, 2013)
  - National Assembly President Juan Guaidó is recognized by more than 50 countries as the interim president.
    - Executive Vice President Delcy Rodriguez Gomez (since June 14, 2018)

== Monthly events ==
=== January ===
- January 1 – New Year's Day
  - Triumph of the Revolution (Liberation Day), Cuba
  - Independence Day, Haiti
- January 6 – Epiphany (Christian holiday)
- January 7 – A 6.4M_{w} 2020 Guayanilla earthquake rocks southwest Puerto Rico. One man died and 8 were injured. Governor Wanda Vázquez Garced declares a state of emergency and activates the national guard.
- January 9 – 2020 Sint Maarten general election
- January 12 – Remembrance Day, Haiti
- January 13 – Eugenio María de Hostos Day, Puerto Rico
- January 18 – Residents of Ponce broke into a warehouse and found bottled water, cots, baby food, and other unused emergency supplies stored since Hurricane Maria in September 2017. Governor Wanda Vázquez fired Carlos Acevedo, the director of the island's emergency management agency.
- January 19
  - World Religion Day, Baháʼí Faith holiday in Suriname
  - Glorimar Andújar and Fernando Gil-Enseñat, Secretaries of Family Services Housing respectively, are fired in the warehouse scandal in Puerto Rico. Nino Correa is appointed chief of operations for the Emergency Management Office.
- January 28 – An earthquake measuring 7.7M_{w} is registered in the Caribbean Sea, 87 miles (140 kilometers) south of Granma Province, Cuba and 83 (134 kilometers) miles north of Montego Bay, Jamaica. No injuries are reported.
- January 31 – Photographer Caroline Power discovers a "blanket" of plastic five miles long and two miles wide (five by three kilometers) near Roatán Island, Honduras. It is believed to have been washed from the Motagua River during heavy rains in Guatemala.

=== February ===
- February 2 – Jennifer Lopez wows the crowd by wearing a costume featuring the flag of Puerto Rico during her half-time appearance at the Super Bowl LIV.
- February 7 – Independence Day, Granada
- February 13 – Fifteen children die in a fire in an orphanage in Kenscoff, Ouest Department Haiti.
- February 14
  - A Royal Caribbean cruise ship from Port Liberty, New Jersey, did not make a scheduled stop in Port Canaveral, Florida, because of fears of the 2019–20 Wuhan coronavirus disease outbreak. The ship was scheduled to sail to The Bahamas, but instead it went to Bermuda.
  - The Caribbean Development Bank (CDB) announces that it plans regional 4% growth for all its borrowing member countries.
- February 16 – 2020 Dominican Republic municipal elections: Software problems force the suspension of the elections.
- February 17
  - 932 kilos of pure gold worth $50 million (€46 million) is discovered on an airplane after it made an emergency landing at Reina Beatrix airport in Aruba.
  - The United Nations Human Rights Commission demands that Cuba immediately liberate three political prisoners arrested on "vague" charges.
- February 18
  - Luis Muñoz Marín Day, Puerto Rico
  - Summit of the Comunidad del Caribe (Caricom) (English: Caribbean Community) in Barbados. Leaders discuss health and economic issues.
- February 22 – Independence Day, Saint Lucia
- February 23
  - Republic Day, Guyana
  - U.S. Senator Bernie Sanders (D-VT), the front-running candidate for the 2020 Democratic presidential nomination, controversially praises Fidel Castro's educational programs.
  - Police in Haiti violently protest against money being spent on a carnaval celebrations instead of their salaries. One soldier dies the next day.
- February 24 – Cuba's annual cigar trade fair begins.
- February 26 – Mexican authorities grant permission for a cruise ship registered in Malta to dock in Cozumel, Quintana Roo, because she carries a passenger presumed to be infected with the coronavirus. The ship was previously denied access to ports in Jamaica and the Cayman Islands. Two cases of flu were found.
- February 27 – Independence Day, Dominican Republic
- February 28 – The Dominican Republic refuses to allow a British cruise ship to dock due to fears of Coronavirus disease 2019. The ship heads to St. Maarten.

=== March ===
- March 1 – The Caribbean Public Health Agency says the area faces a "moderate to high" danger of exposure to COVID-19. No cases have been confirmed in the region to date.
- March 2– 2020 Guyanese general election
- March 7 – Hamilton Lavity Stoutt Day, British Virgin Islands
- March 9 and 10 – Phagwah, Hindu festival of colours; Guyana, Suriname, Trinidad and Tobago
- March 19 – Saint Joseph's Day, Colombia, Venezuela
- March 12 – Jamaica reports eight cases of COVID-19, Dominican Republic 5, Cuba 4. Martinique 3, St. Martin 2, Trinidad and Tobago, St. Vincent & Grenadines, Antigua and Barbuda, Saint Barthelemy, and Caymen Islands one each.
  - Cuban authorities say they have developed a new medicine that has proven effective in treating COVID-19, and that is being offered for sale on the international market.
- March 15
  - The 2020 Dominican Republic general election that had originally been scheduled for February 16 was carried out despite concerns about COVID-19.
  - In a historic first, all Peace Corps volunteers worldwide are withdrawn from their host countries.
- March 18
  - National Anthem and Flag Day (Kingdom of the Netherlands)
  - The government of Puerto Rico implements a curfew and closes schools, some businesses, and government agencies.
  - Ghislaine Maxwell, a former associate of the late Jeffrey Epstein, sues his estate in Superior Court in the U.S. Virgin Islands because she has received threats requiring her to hire personal security services.
- March 19 – First two cases of COVID-19 in Haiti. Airports, schools, factories, and seaports are closed.
- March 22 – Emancipation Day, Puerto Rico
- March 24 – Barbados is declared the winner of the West Indies cricket championship after the tournament is suspended due to the pandemic.
- March 29 – The United States Coast Guard issues a safety bulletin for Florida, Georgia, South Carolina, and Puerto Rico stating that foreign-flagged vessels carrying more than 50 people should prepare to treat any sick passengers and crew on board and try to medically evacuate the very sick to their countries home countries.
- March 30 – Spiritual Baptist/Shouter Liberation Day, Trinidad and Tobago

=== April ===
- April 1
  - U.S. President Donald Trump announces that he is stepping up pressure on Venezuelan President Nicolás Maduro after indicating Maduro on drug and terrorism charges. Trump sends anti-drug Navy ships and AWACS planes to the region near Venezuela in the largest military build-up in the region since the 1989 invasion of Panama to remove General Manuel Noriega from power.
  - Three Cuban dissidents, including José Daniel Ferrer, arrested on October 1, 2019, have been released to house arrest.
- April 2 – The United Kingdom sends the armed hospital ship RFA Argus to the Caribbean to stop the narcotics trade from Venezuela. France sent the Dixmunde a few days earlier. This is the largest armada ever assembled in the Western Hemisphere.
- April 3 – The Venezuelan patrol boat Naiguata rammed the Portuguese-flagged RCGS Resolute, which was accused of piracy. The Naiguata sank.
- April 16 – Forty-two people die after drinking adulterated alcohol from three clandestine distilleries in the Dominican Republic.
- April 16–19 – Congress of the Communist Party of Cuba
- April 20 – Haiti reports that three migrants deported from the United States are infected with COVID-19.
- April 21 – The United Nations Economic Commission for Latin America and the Caribbean estimates that the COVID-19 pandemic may result in a 5.3% in GDP in the region, resulting in a 4.4% increase in poverty and a 2.5% increase in extreme poverty—29 million people.
- April 24 – California-based Chevron Corporation must end its oil operations in Venezuela by December 1. Chevron's net daily production in 2019 averaged 35,300 barrels of crude oil, equal to roughly 6% of Venezuela's total production.
- April 23
  - An Iranian Airbus A340-642 lands in Paraguaná Peninsula. There is speculation that the flight may be related to drug trafficking, as Falcón State is close to the ABC Islands and the family of Falcón governor Stella Lugo Betancourt is believed to have ties to narcotics dealers.
  - U.S.-based Church of Bible Understanding faces charges of negligence in relation to the February 13 fire that killed 13 children and two adults in a Haitian orphanage.
- April 26
  - Cuba sends 1,200 doctors to 22 countries to help with the COVID-19 pandemic.
  - April 26 – Rescheduled date for the 2020 Puerto Rico Democratic primary
- April 27 – King's Day (birthday of King Willem-Alexander), Curaçao
- April 29
  - 500 Venezuela migrants living in Colombia block a highway in protest of the lockdown due to the COVID-19 pandemic in Colombia. They say the makes it impossible for them to work. There are 1.8 million Venezuelan migrants living in Colombia.
  - Two dozen Colombians deported from the United States have been found to have coronavirus. Other infections among deportees have been found in Haiti, Mexico, Guatemala, and Jamaica.
- April 30 – A gunman attacks the Embassy of Cuba in Washington, D.C.

=== May ===
- May 1 – Labour Day in Cuba, Dominican Republic, and Venezuela. "Agriculture and Labour Day" in Haiti
- May 2
  - A series of earthquakes strike Puerto Rico and the Dominican Republic. One centered in Tallaboa, Encarnación, Peñuelas, Puerto Rico has a M_{w}5.4. Power outages and damages are reported in Puerto Rico where families cannot be relocated in shelters because of the COVID-19 pandemic.
  - Guyana reports oil revenues of $60 million.
  - El Observatorio Cubano de Derechos Humanos (The Cuban Observatory of Human Rights, OCDH0) reports that activist Enix Berrio Sardá is missing.
- May 3 – Venezuela says that they defeated a boat invasion of "mercenary terrorists" from Colombia in the port city of La Guaira.
- May 5 – Indian Arrival Day, Grenada, Guyana, Jamaica
- May 6 – U.S. Secretary of State Mike Pompeo denies U.S. government in the Sunday boat attack on Venezuela and says they will use 'every tool' to release the two Americans arrested.
- May 8 – COVID-19 pandemic: Haiti faces hunger and a breakdown of its health services. There are 34,000 people in resettlement camps and the country has reported eleven deaths and 100 coronavirus infections.
- May 10 – Mother's Day, Venezuela, Puerto Rico, United States Virgin Islands
- May 18 – Discovery Day, Cayman Islands
- May 19 – AT&T closes its operations in Venezuela.
- May 24 – Bermuda Day
- May 25 – 2020 Surinamese general election: Won by Chan Santokhi, Progressive Reform Party with 39.45% of the votes.
- May 26
  - Independence Day, Guyana
  - Emmanuel Constant, the accused leader of a Haitian death squad, was not among thirty Haitians deported from the U.S. All 30 have tested negative for COVID-19. Some of the 200 deported earlier this year have tested positive for the virus.
  - Vote counting in the 2020 Surinamese general election is suspended because the ruling party is losing and the workers are exhausted after numerous complaints of electoral fraud.
- May 27 – A federal court suspends budget cuts for the Puerto Rican government.
- May 28 – Legislative leaders from Colombia and Cuba will meet with their counterparts from eight other Latin American countries to discuss a response to the COVID-19 pandemic.
- May 30
  - Anguilla Day
  - Indian Arrival Day, Trinidad and Tobago

=== June ===
- June 1 – Target date for reopening Jamaica and the U.S. Virgin Islands to tourism after COVID-19 pandemic.
- June 1 to November 30 – The National Oceanic and Atmospheric Administration predicts between 13 and 19 named storms this year, including three to six major hurricanes.
- June 5
  - Indian Arrival Day, Suriname
  - 2020 Saint Kitts and Nevis general election: Won by Timothy Harris, People's Labour Party (Team Unity) with 54.86% of the votes.
  - Suriname releases a preliminary report showing opposition leader Chandrikapersad "Chan" Santokhi won the May 25 presidential election.
  - Venezuela arrests three local executives, Venezuelan citizens, of DirecTV after the Dallas-based company closed its offices on May 19.
  - Tropical storm Cristobal causes severe flooding in southern Mexico and threatens the Gulf coast of the United States.
- June 7 – COVID-19 pandemic: Cuba is praised for its response to the pandemic. The country reports 2,173 confirmed cases of and 83 deaths from coronavirus.
- June 8
  - The United States Department of the Treasury cancels the licence for Marriott Hotels & Resorts to operate in Havana, Cuba, effective August 31.
  - The ruling coalition in Guyana says it will go to court to prevent a declaration that the People's Progressive Party won the March 2 presidential election.
- June 11
  - Feast of Corpus Christi, Venezuela
  - Luis Abinader, candidate for president of the Dominican Republic, tests positive for COVID-19.
  - The WHO reports a decrease in malaria in Latin America, mainly due to decreases in Venezuela, Colombia, and Guyana, although there are fears that many cases are going undetected as sick people stay home instead of going to hospitals. In the first five months of 2020, Venezuela registered 104,005 cases, a decrease of 58% compared to 248,191 in the same period in 2019. Haiti, Suriname, and Dominican Republic report increases.
- June 13 – Birthday of Queen Elizabeth II (celebrated in British overseas territories)
- July 14 – Fête de la Federation (celebrated in overseas departments and collectivities of France)
- June 15 – Target date for reopening Aruba to tourism after COVID-19 pandemic.
- June 16 – Mexican President Andrés Manuel López Obrador says that Mexico will sell fuel to Venezuela for humanitarian purposes if requested.
- June 21 – Father's Day, Venezuela, Puerto Rico, U.S. Virgin Islands
- June 24
  - Feast of St. John the Baptist and Anniversary of the Battle of Carabobo, Venezuela
  - A large dust storm from the Sahara Desert covers Puerto Rico and Cuba.
- June 29
  - Feast of Saints Peter and Paul, Colombia and Venezuela
  - 2020 Anguillian general election: Won by Ellis Webster, Anguilla Progressive Movement
- June 30 – At Guyana's request, the International Court of Justice (ICJ) agrees to rule on the border dispute between Guyana and Venezuela.

=== July ===
- July 1
  - Keti Koti, Emancipation Day, Suriname
  - Territory Day, British Virgin Islands
- July 3
  - Emancipation Day, U.S. Virgin Islands
  - 16th century and 21st century policing methods are compared on social media in Trinidad and Tobago.
- July 4 – Independence Day (United States) (U.S. Virgin Islands and Puerto Rico)
- July 5
  - Independence Day, Venezuela
  - 2020 Dominican Republic general election: Won by Luis Abinader, Modern Revolutionary Party with 53.11% of the votes.
- July 6
  - Constitution Day, Cayman Islands
  - CARICOM Day, Guyana
- July 10 – Independence Day, The Bahamas
- July 12
  - Schoelcher Day (Slavery Abolition Day) in Saint Martin
  - In an interview in The New York Times, former secretary of Homeland Security Elaine Duke reports that President Trump's first reaction to Hurricane Maria in 2017 was to sell Puerto Rico.
- July 13 – COVID-19 pandemic: A report by The New York Times and the Marshall Project indicates that U.S. Immigration and Customs Enforcement (ICE) worsened the spread of the pandemic by deporting sick people to their countries of origin, including Haiti.
- July 17 – Venezuela protests against the incursion of the American destroyer USS ''Pinckney'' only 16.1 nautical miles (30 km) from its coast. The United States recognizes jurisdiction of only 12 nautical miles and insists the ship was in international waters.
- July 20 – The Bahamas announces that commercial flights and sea cruises from most countries, including the United States, will be banned starting on July 22.
- July 23 – Authorities in Colombia seize a luxury mansion allegedly belonging to businessman Alex Saab, who was detained in Cape Verde on U.S. corruption charges related to Venezuelan President Nicolás Maduro.
- July 24 – Simón Bolívar birthday, Venezuela
- July 25
  - Puerto Rico Constitution Day
  - COVID-19 pandemic: Mexico and Japan send medical supplies to ten Latin American countries, including the Dominican Republic.
- July 25 to 27 – Assault on the Moncada Barracks, Cuba
- July 31 – Hurricane Isaias strikes Turcos and Caicos and threatens the Bahamas. The Category 1 hurricane batters the Dominican Republic, Haiti, and Puerto Rico.

=== August ===
- August 1 – Emancipation Day; Guyana, Jamaica, Trinidad & Tobago
- August 3 – Panama proposes sending 2,000 Haitian, Cuban, and African migrants home after disturbances in camps.
- August 4 – Former Colombian President Álvaro Uribe (2002-2010) is placed under house arrest in relation to a case investigating alleged witness tampering. One day later he tests positive for COVID-19.
- August 5 – Emancipation Day, the Bahamas
- August 6
  - Independence Day, Jamaica (from the United Kingdom, 1962)
  - COVID-19 pandemic: One day after reporting no new cases, Cuba reports 49 new infections.
- August 7 – The El Salvador Supreme Court rejects efforts to reopen the economy.
- August 8
  - Javanese Arrival Day, Suriname
  - Two former Green Berets are sentenced to 20 years in prison for a May 3 attack on Venezuela.
- August 9
  - Indigenous Peoples' Day, Suriname
  - Rescheduled Puerto Rico primary elections Some elections are rescheduled because there are not enough ballots.
- August 10 – 2020 Trinidad and Tobago general election Prime Minister Keith Rowley and the opposition United National Congress concedes defeat.
- August 12 – An oil spill near Venezuela's Morrocoy National Park threatens Caribbean beaches and local wildlife.
- August 14 – Tropical Storm Josephine dumps 1 to 3 cm of rain in the Leeward Islands, Puerto Rico, and the Virgin Islands.
- August 15 – Assumption of Mary, Haiti, Venezuela
- August 16
  - Restoration Day, Dominican Republic: Luis Abinader is sworn in as the new president. U.S. Vice-President Mike Pence and Haiti President Jovenel Moïse attend the ceremony, which is low-key due to the pandemic.
  - Second round of primary elections in Puerto Rico after ballot mishap.
- August 18 – U.S. customs agents in Florida intercept a Venezuela-bound plane that is loaded with guns and ammunition. The flight plan listed St. Vincent and the Grenadines as its destination.
- August 21 – Colombian President Ivan Duque says Venezuela is planning to give its Russian- and Belarus-made missiles to armed groups in Colombia and uy new ones from Iran. Madero says it would be a good idea.
- August 22 – The National Hurricane Center reports that Tropical Storm Laura is over the Virgin Islands and Puerto Rico, and it predicts that Hurricane Marco will make landfall in the Yucatán Peninsula in the western Caribbean on August 24.
- August 23 – A ten-year-old girl is killed in Haiti by Hurricane Laura. 100,000 people are evacuated and two are killed in the Dominican Republic.
- August 24 – St. Barthelemy Day
- August 28 – The United Nations High Commissioner for Refugees (ACNUR) reports that three out of four of the 81,000 Nicaraguan refugees in Costa Rica suffers from hunger.
- August 31 – Independence Day, Trinidad and Tobago (from the United Kingdom, 1962)

=== September ===
- September 1 – COVID-19 pandemic: Cuba imposes a curfew and other strict measures to control virus spread.
- September 3
  - U.S. Customs and Border Protection decommission $27 million in undeclared cash before it enters the U.S Virgin Islands.
  - U.S. Virgin Islands government sues the estate of Jeffrey Epstein and billionaire Glenn Dubin for documents about their financial ties.
- September 9
  - ICE confiscates US$500,000 in undeclared money destined for Dominica at the Miami International Airport.
  - The Pittsburgh Pirates take #21 out of retirement for a game against the Chicago White Sox at PNC Park. September 9 is celebrated by Major League Baseball (MLB) as "Roberto Clemente Day". Clemente, a Puerto Rico native, died in a plane crash in December 1972 while en route to Nicaragua to deliver disaster relief to victims of an earthquake.
- September 12 – Mauricio Claver-Carone becomes the first citizen of the U.S. to lead the Inter-American Development Bank.
- September 14 – Our Lady of Coromoto, patroness of Venezuela
- September 16
  - Barbados Governor General says the country should leave the Commonwealth and become a Republic by November 2021.
  - Mexican researchers have identified remains of the ship La Unión as one that was used to carry Maya slaves from Yucatán to Cuba during the Caste War of Yucatán.
  - Indigenous Misak in Popayán, Cauca Department, Colombia tear down a statue of Spanish conquistador Sebastián de Belalcázar.
- September 17
  - Hurricane Maria: Trump releases $13 billion in relief aid to help victims of the 2017 hurricane.
  - U.S. Secretary of State Mike Pompeo begins a visit to Suriname, Guyana, Colombia, and Brazil.
- September 18 – The United States and Guyana announce joint sea patrols near the disputed Guyana-Venezuela border.
- September 19
  - Independence Day, Saint Kitts and Nevis (from the United Kingdom, 1983)
  - Dissident police officers belonging to the group Fantom 509 threaten to "burn the country" if their demands for better pay are not met in Haiti.
  - The United States announces $348 million in humanitarian aid for Venezuelans inside and outside the country.
- September 24
  - Republic Day, Trinidad and Tobago
  - Colombian singer J Balvin is among the seven Latinamericans included in list of one hundred most influential people in the world by Time.

=== October ===
- October 2—7 – Tropical Storm Gamma: Kills seven, US$100 million in damages.
- October 5 – Thanksgiving, Saint Lucia
- October 5—12 – Hurricane Delta: Kills seven, US$4.1 billion in damages.
- October 10
  - Independence Day (from Spain, 1868) and Liberation Day, Cuba
  - Day of the Maroons, Suriname
- October 12
  - Columbus Day
  - "Day of Indigenous Resistance", Venezuela
  - "Day of the Race and Hispanicity" and in Discovery Day, Colombia
  - Heroes' Day, the Bahamas
- October 16 – Heroes' Day, Jamaica
- October 17 – Jean-Jacques Dessalines Day, Haiti
- October 19—26 – Hurricane Epsilon in Bermuda.
- October 20 – Chinese Arrival Day, Suriname
- October 21
  - Saint Ursula Day, British Virgin Islands
  - 2020 Sint Eustatius Island Council election
- October 24—29 – Hurricane Zeta: Kills eight, US$3.2 billion in damages.
- October 25 – Thanksgiving Day, Granada
- October 27 – Independence Day, Saint Vincent and the Grenadines (from the United Kingdom, 1979)

=== November ===
- November 1 – Independence Day, Antigua and Barbuda (from the United Kingdom, 1981)
- October 31—November 13 – Hurricane Eta: Kills 163, 127 missing; US $5.2 billion in damages.
- November 3
  - 2020 Puerto Rico gubernatorial election: Won by Pedro Pierluisi of the New Progressive Party. The non-binding vote on statehood also won.
  - Independence Day, Dominica (from the United Kingdom, 1978)
- November 5 – 2020 Vincentian general election Unity Labour Party wins nine of 15 seats.
- November 11
  - Independence of Cartagena, Colombia
  - St. Martin's Day (celebrated in Saint Martin and Sint Maarten)
  - 2020 Belizean general election
- November 12 – COVID-19: At least seven people test positive during the first cruise in months.
- November 13 – Tropical Storm Theta
- November 14 – Deepavali, Hindu holiday; Guyana, Suriname
- November 16 – Hurricane Iota: Category 5 hurricane is expected to make landfall in Honduras and Nicaragua.

=== December ===
- December 6 – 2020 Venezuelan parliamentary election: Turnout is 31% as Maduro's government is reelected with 67.6%, the traditional opposition won 17.95%, and dissidents on the left won 3% of the vote. Eighteen countries in America (including the United States and Canada but excluding Argentina, Bolivia, and Mexico) call the election fraudulent and illegal.
- December 7 – The Armed Forces of the Dominican Republic announce they have found eight bodies and seventeen people are missing from a boat capsizing near Lavacama, La Altagracia Province.
- December 18 – The United States Coast Guard and Navy and the Dutch Caribbean Coast Guard apprehend seven vessels near Puerto Rico and the Dominican Republic with 3,700 pounds of cocaine; 19 arrested in the $60 million seizure.
- December 22 – COVID-19 pandemic in the Cayman Islands: Skylar Mack, 18, a student from Loganville, Georgia, and Vanjae Ramgeet, 24, a professional jet ski racer from the Cayman Islands, will have to serve only two months each in a Caymanian prison after being convicted of violating quarantine rules in November.
- December 30 – Authorities issue volcanic alerts in Martinique and Saint Vincent and the Grenadines. Mount Pelée became active in early December and La Soufrière on December 29.

== Predicted and scheduled events ==
- November 18 – Battle of Vertières, Haiti
- November 19 – Discovery or Puerto Rico Day
- November 26 – Thanksgiving (United States) (U.S. Virgin Islands and Puerto Rico)
- November 30 – Independence Day, Barbados
- December 5 – Discovery Day, Haiti and Dominican Republic
- December 8 – Immaculate Conception, Venezuela
- December 9 – Vere Bird Day, Antigua and Barbuda
- December 23 – "Afro-Latino Travels With Kim Haas," a TV series honoring Afro-Latinos, premiers on PBS.
- December 25 – Christmas Day
- December 26 – Boxing Day, British territories
- TBA – 2020 General elections in Turks and Caicos Islands

== Deaths ==
=== January ===
- January 4 – Puerto Plata, 96, Dominican musician
- January 9 – Basil Butcher, 86, West Indian cricket player (1957-1969)
- January 10 – Carlos Cuco Rojas, Colombian harpist (b. 1954)
- January 14 – Bernard Diederich, Haitian journalist, author and historian (b. 1926)
- 16 January 16 – Efraín Sánchez, Colombian soccer player (b, 1926)
- January 22
  - Hercules Ayala, 69, Puerto Rican professional wrestler (Stampede Wrestling, NJPW, WWC)
  - Addy Valero, 50, Venezuelan politician, Deputy (since 2016); uterine cancer
- January 23 – Sir Frederick Ballantyne, 83, Vincentian cardiologist, Governor-General (2002–2019)
- January 24
  - Georges Castera, 83, Haitian poet and writer (b. 1936)
  - Kennedy Isles, 28, Saint Kitts and Nevis footballer; shot
- January 27 – Ramón Avilés, 68, Puerto Rican baseball player (Boston Red Sox, Philadelphia Phillies)

=== February ===
- February 4 – Kamau Brathwaite, 89, Barbadian poet and academic
- February 6 – Jhon Jairo Velásquez, 57, Colombian hitman, drug dealer and extortionist (Medellín Cartel); esophageal cancer
- February 7 – Wichie Torres, 67, Puerto Rican painter; cardiovascular disease
- February 10 – Efigenio Ameijeiras, 88, Cuban revolutionary and military commander (Bay of Pigs Invasion), sepsis.
- February 13 – Darryl Braxton, Trinidadian record producer (Bunji Garlin, KMC)
- February 15 – Tony Fernández, 57, Dominican baseball player (Toronto Blue Jays, San Diego Padres, Cleveland Indians); complications from kidney disease and stroke
- February 26 – Clementina Vélez, 73, Colombian doctor, academic and politician, MP (1990–1991, 1998–2002) and city councillor of Cali (1972–1986, 1992–1997, 2004–2019); heart attack
- February 27
  - Irvino English, 42, Jamaican soccer player (national team), shot
  - Juan Diego González, 39, Colombian footballer (Once Caldas, La Equidad, Philadelphia Union) (body discovered on this date)

=== March ===
- March 2
  - Rafael Cancel Miranda, 89, Puerto Rican independence leader and convicted attempted murderer (1954 United States Capitol shooting incident).
  - René Coicou, 84, Haitian-born Canadian politician, mayor of Gagnon, Quebec (1973–1985).
- March 20 Belarmino Correa Yepes, 89, Colombian Roman Catholic prelate, Bishop of San José del Guaviare (1999–2006)
- March 23 – Apple Gabriel, 67–68, Jamaican reggae singer (Israel Vibration).
- March 24
  - Juan Padrón, 73, Cuban comics artist (Elpidio Valdés) and animator (Vampires in Havana), lung disease.
  - Jenny Polanco, 61, Dominican fashion designer and beauty pageant winner (Miss World Dominican Republic 1978), COVID-19.
- March 27
  - Bob Andy, 75, Jamaican reggae singer (The Paragons, Bob and Marcia), songwriter and actor (The Mighty Quinn).
  - Delroy Washington, 67, British-Jamaican reggae singer.
  - Kalil Haché, 87, Dominican military colonel and cavalry commander, COVID-19.
- March 28 – Pearson Jordan, 69, Barbadian Olympic sprinter (1976); COVID-19
- March 31 – Sam Clayton Jr., 58, Jamaican bobsledder (national team); COVID-19

=== April ===
- April 3 – Hans Prade, 81, Surinamese diplomat; COVID-19
- April 4 – Kenneth Farnum, 89, Barbadian-born Jamaican Olympic cyclist (1952); COVID-19
- April 6 – Claude Barthélemy, 74, Haitian soccer player (Detroit Cougars, national team)
- April 7
  - John Percy Leon Lewis, 77, Guyanese military officer; COVID-19
- Miguel Ángel Tábet, 78, Venezuelan theologian and exegete, COVID-19.
- April 8 – Lois Kelly Miller, 102, Jamaican actress (Meet Joe Black)
- April 10
  - Julio Blanco Alfonso, 82, Cuban soccer player (FC Industriales, national team)
  - Bas Mulder, 88, Dutch-Surinamese priest; COVID-19
  - Iris M. Zavala, 83, Puerto Rican author, independence activist and intellectual; COVID-19
- April 12 – Victor Batista Falla, 87, Cuban publisher and editor; COVID-19
- April 13 – Gil Bailey, 84, Jamaican radio broadcaster, COVID-19.
- April 14 – Michael Gilkes, 86, Guyanese writer; COVID-19
- April 15 – Dámaso García, 63, Dominican baseball player (Toronto Blue Jays, Montreal Expos) and footballer (national team)
- April 16 – Althea McNish, 95, Trinidadian-British textile designer
- April 23 – Rinaldo Entingh, 64, Surinamese soccer player (Robinhood, national team); traffic collision

=== May ===
- May 4 – Álvaro Teherán, 54, Colombian basketball player (Baloncesto Málaga, Fort Wayne Fury, KK Olimpija); kidney failure
- May 5 – Millie Small, 72, Jamaican singer ("My Boy Lollipop"); stroke
- May 6 – Michael Gordon, Jamaican photojournalist (Jamaica Observer)
- May 7 – Emile Wijntuin, 95, Surinamese politician, Chairman of the Staten (1973–1975) and of the National Assembly (1975–1980)
- May 21
  - Bobby Digital, 59, Jamaican reggae and dancehall producer
  - Roberto Moya, 55, Cuban athlete, Olympic bronze medallist (1992)

=== June ===
- June 5 – Anthony T. Bryan, Barbadian publisher (Barbados Advocate) and media executive.
- June 10 – Rosita Fornés, 97, Cuban American singer who starred in several movies during the Golden Age of Mexican cinema; emphysema
- June 18
  - Hux Brown, 75, Jamaican guitarist (Toots and the Maytals).
  - Jules Sedney, 97, Surinamese economist and politician, Prime Minister (1969–1973) and Governor of the Central Bank of Suriname (1980–1983).
  - Antonio Veciana, 91, Cuban spy (CIA, Alpha 66).
- June 20 – William Millerson, 67, Aruban-born Curaçaoan karateka and politician, chairman of the Estates of Curaçao (2017–2020).
- June 23
  - Margarita Pracatan, 89, Cuban singer.
  - Luis R. Varela, 82, Cuban-born American Puerto Rican sportswriter (Associated Press); complications from intestinal surgery.

=== July ===
- July 1 – Everton Weekes, 95, Barbadian cricketer (West Indies, national team).
- July 3 – Earl Cameron, 102, Bermudian-born British actor (Doctor Who, Pool of London, The Interpreter).
- July 4 – James Lee Wah, 89, Trinidadian theater promoter and educator.
- July 14
  - Hernán Alemán, 65, Venezuelan opposition politician; COVID-19.
  - Noël Martin, 60, Jamaican-born British assisted suicide activist and neo-Nazi victim.
- July 16
  - Tony Taylor, 84, Cuban baseball player (Chicago Cubs, Philadelphia Phillies, Detroit Tigers); complications from a stroke.
  - Víctor Víctor, 71, Dominican singer-songwriter and guitarist; COVID-19.
- July 18 – Martha Flores, 91, Cuban radio host, journalist and singer (Cuban-American lobby); pancreatic cancer.
- July 21 – Dobby Dobson, 78, Jamaican reggae singer and record producer; COVID-19.
- July 25 – Paulette Wilson, 64, Jamaican-British human rights activist.
- July 31 – Eusebio Leal, 77, Cuban historian (Old Havana).

=== August ===
- August 5 – Blanca Rodríguez, 94, Venezuelan socialite, First Lady of Venezuela (1974–1979, 1989–1993); respiratory failure.
- August 7 – Ángela Salazar, 66, Colombian women's rights activist, COVID-19.
- August 11 – Édouard de Lépine, 88, Martinican historian and politician, Mayor of Le Robert (1989–1995).
- August 13 – Darío Vivas, 70, Venezuelan politician, head of government of the Capital District (since 2020), COVID-19.
- August 18 – Soeki Irodikromo, 75, Surinamese painter.
- August 31 – Daddy Boastin', 61, Saint Vincent-born Swedish rapper; cancer.

=== September ===
- September 15 – Sheldon Gomes, 69, Trinidadian cricketer (North Trinidad, East Trinidad, national team).

=== October ===
- October 19 – Walter Bardgett, 88, Bermudan Olympic swimmer (1948, 1956).

=== November ===
- November 24 – Julio César Gandarilla Bermejo, 77, Cuban vice admiral, Minister of the Interior (since 2017).
- November 28 – Clifton Bertrand, 84, Trinidadian Olympic sprinter (1960, 1964).

=== December ===
- December 2 – Adriano Miguel Tejada, 72, Dominican lawyer, journalist and historian; pancreatitis.
- December 19 – Vinicio Franco, 87, Dominican merengue singer-songwriter; COVID-19.

== See also ==
- 2020s
- 2020 in Central America
- 2020 in Mexico
- 2020 in the United States
- 2020 in politics and government
- 2020s in political history
- COVID-19 pandemic on cruise ships
- List of George Floyd protests outside the United States
- List of state leaders in the Caribbean in 2020
- 2020 Atlantic hurricane season
