= 2026 in Suriname =

- Decades: 2000s; 2010s; 2020s
- See also: Other events of 2026; History of Suriname

Events in the year 2026 in Suriname.

== Incumbents ==
- President: Jennifer Geerlings-Simons
- Vice President: Gregory Rusland
- Speaker: Ashwin Adhin

== Holidays ==
- 1 January – New Year's Day
- 17 February – Chinese New Year
- 3 March – Phagwah
- 20 March – Eid al-Fitr
- 3 April – Good Friday
- 5 April – Easter Sunday
- 6 April – Easter Monday
- 1 May – Labour Day
- 27 May – Eid al-Adha
- 1 July – Emancipation Day
- 9 August – Indigenous People's Day
- 10 October – Day of the Maroons
- 8 November – Diwali
- 25 November – Independence Day
- 25–26 December – Christmas Day

== Deaths ==
- 8 January – Astrid Roemer, 78, author
- 30 March – Chan Santokhi, 67, president (2020–2025), minister of justice (2005–2010), and twice MNA.
