= 2020 in Suriname =

- Decades: 2000s; 2010s; 2020s
- See also: Other events of 2020; History of Suriname

Events in the year 2020 in Suriname.

== Incumbents ==
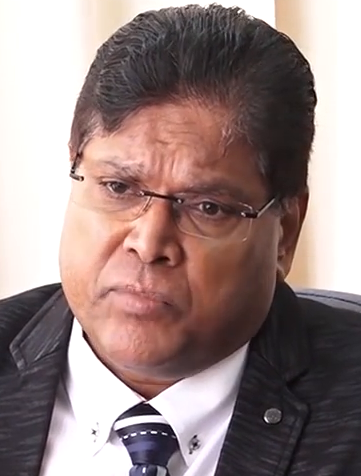
Chan Santokhi, new president from 16 July.

- President: Dési Bouterse (until 16 July); Chan Santokhi (from 16 July)
- Vice President: Ashwin Adhin (until 16 July); Ronnie Brunswijk (from 16 July)
- Speaker: Jennifer Simons (until 28 June); Ronnie Brunswijk (from 29 June to 14 July); Marinus Bee (from 14 July)

== Events ==
- 25 May – 2020 Surinamese general election
- 16 July – Chan Santokhi takes over as president.

== Deaths ==
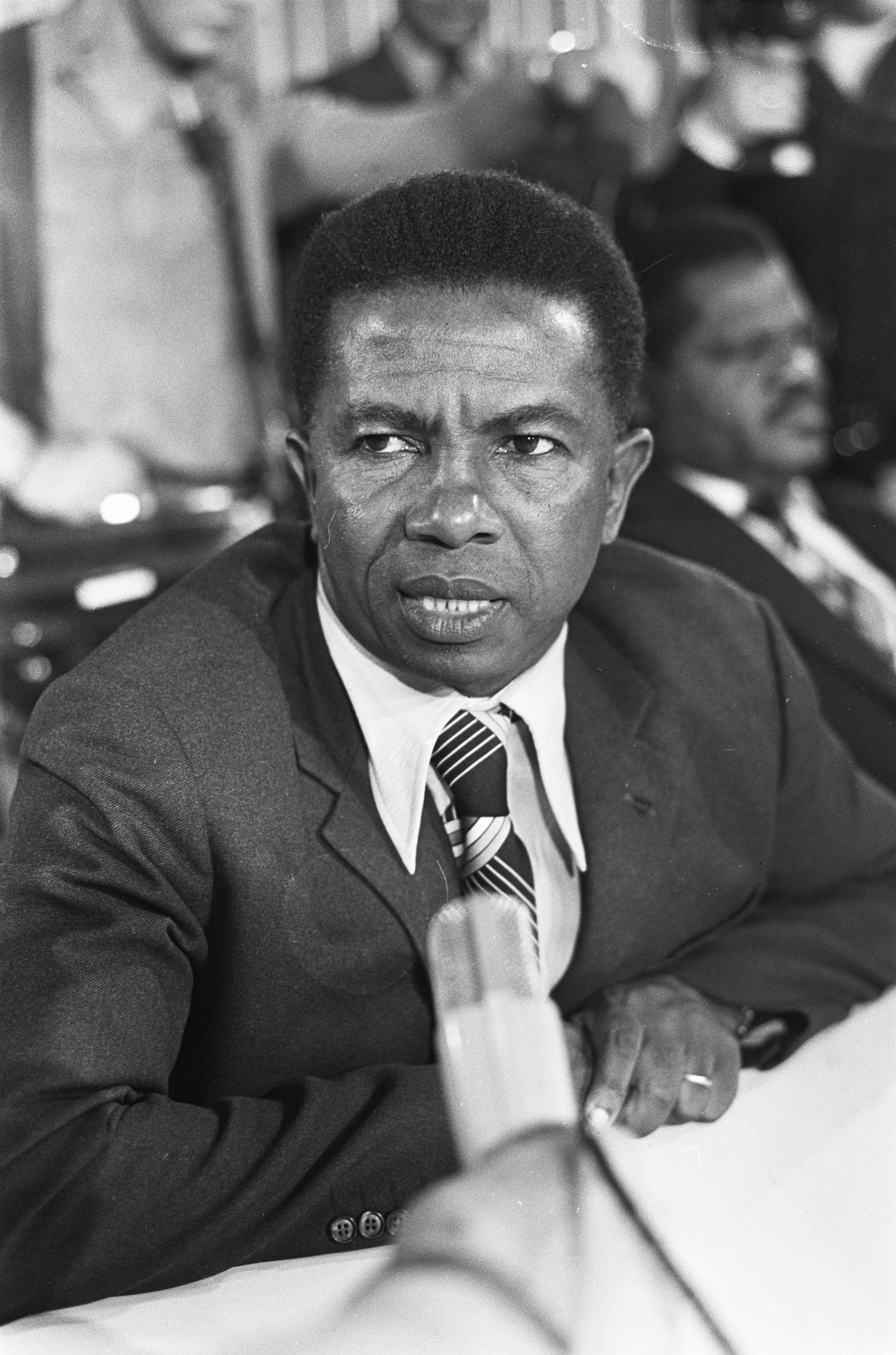
Emile Wijntuin

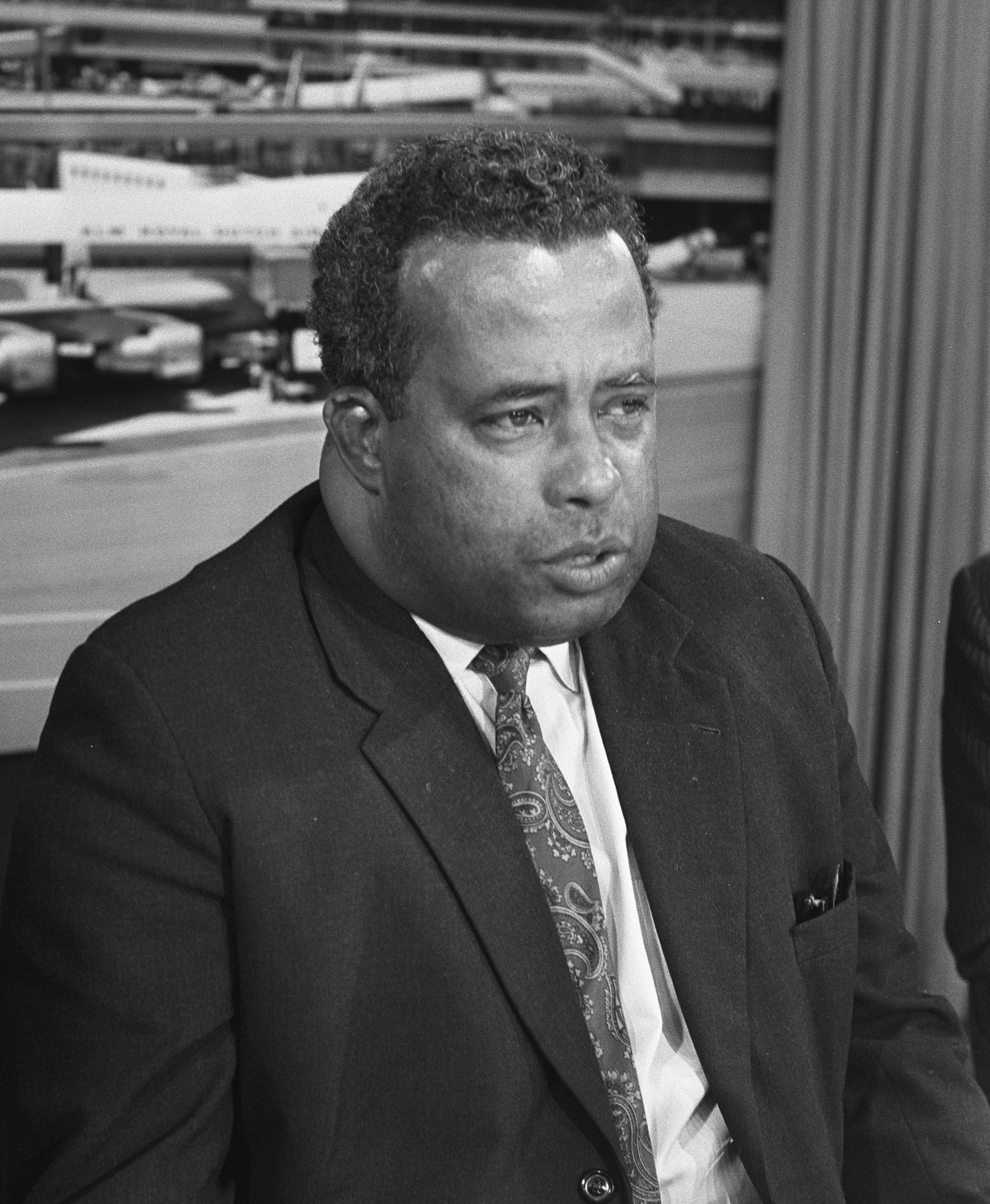
Jules Sedney

- 3 April – Hans Prade, diplomat, (b. 1938).
- 10 April – Bas Mulder, priest (b. 1931).
- 12 April – Kishen Bholasing, singer (b. 1984).
- 22 April – Rinaldo Entingh, footballer and entrepreneur (b. 1955/1956).
- 7 May – Emile Wijntuin, politician (b. 1924).
- 11 May – Ietje Paalman-de Miranda, Surinamese born Dutch mathematician (b. 1936).
- 18 June – Jules Sedney, economist and politician (b. 1922).
- 18 August – Soeki Irodikromo, 75, Surinamese painter.
