= 2025 in Suriname =

- Decades: 2000s; 2010s; 2020s
- See also: Other events of 2025; History of Suriname

Events in the year 2025 in Suriname.

== Incumbents ==
- President: Chan Santokhi (until 16 July); Jennifer Geerlings-Simons (since 16 July)
- Vice President Ronnie Brunswijk (until 16 July); Gregory Rusland (since 16 July)
- Speaker: Marinus Bee (until 27 June); Ashwin Adhin (since 27 June)

== Events ==
- 10 March – Foreign minister Albert Ramdin is elected OAS secretary general, making him the first Caribbean leader to take the role.
- 25 May – 2025 Surinamese general election: No party obtains a majority in the 51-seat National Assembly, with the National Democratic Party (NDP) winning 18 seats followed by the ruling Progressive Reform Party at 17.
- 27 May – The NDP announces a coalition agreement with the Brotherhood and Unity in Politics party; the General Liberation and Development Party; the National Party of Suriname; and Pertjajah Luhur.
- 6 July – The National Assembly elects NDP leader Jennifer Geerlings-Simons as the first female president of Suriname.
- 16 July – Jennifer Geerlings-Simons is inaugurated as president of Suriname.
- 28 December – Nine people, including five children, are killed in a knife attack in Richelieu, Commewijne District. The suspect is arrested but dies from suicide in police custody the next day.

== Holidays ==
- 1 January – New Year's Day
- 29 January – Chinese New Year
- 14 March – Phagwah
- 30 March – Eid al-Fitr
- 18 April – Good Friday
- 20 April – Easter Sunday
- 21 April – Easter Monday
- 1 May – Labour Day
- 6 June – Eid al-Adha
- 1 July – Ketikoti (Emancipation Day – end of slavery)
- 9 August – Indigenous People's Day
- 10 October – Day of the Maroons
- 21 October – Diwali
- 25 November – Independence Day
- 25 December – Christmas Day

== Deaths ==
- 30 April – Jules Wijdenbosch, 83, president (1996–2000) and prime minister (1987–1988).
- 22 June – Patricia Etnel, 49, MP (since 2015).
- 22 June – Marijke Djwalapersad, 73, chairperson of the National Assembly (1996–2000).
- 5 November – Ronald Venetiaan, 89, president (1991–1996, 2000–2010).
