= 2018 in Suriname =

- Decades: 1990s; 2000s; 2010s; 2020s
- See also: Other events of 2018; History of Suriname

Events in the year 2018 in Suriname.

== Incumbents ==
- President: Dési Bouterse
- Vice President: Ashwin Adhin
- Speaker: Jennifer Simons

== Deaths ==
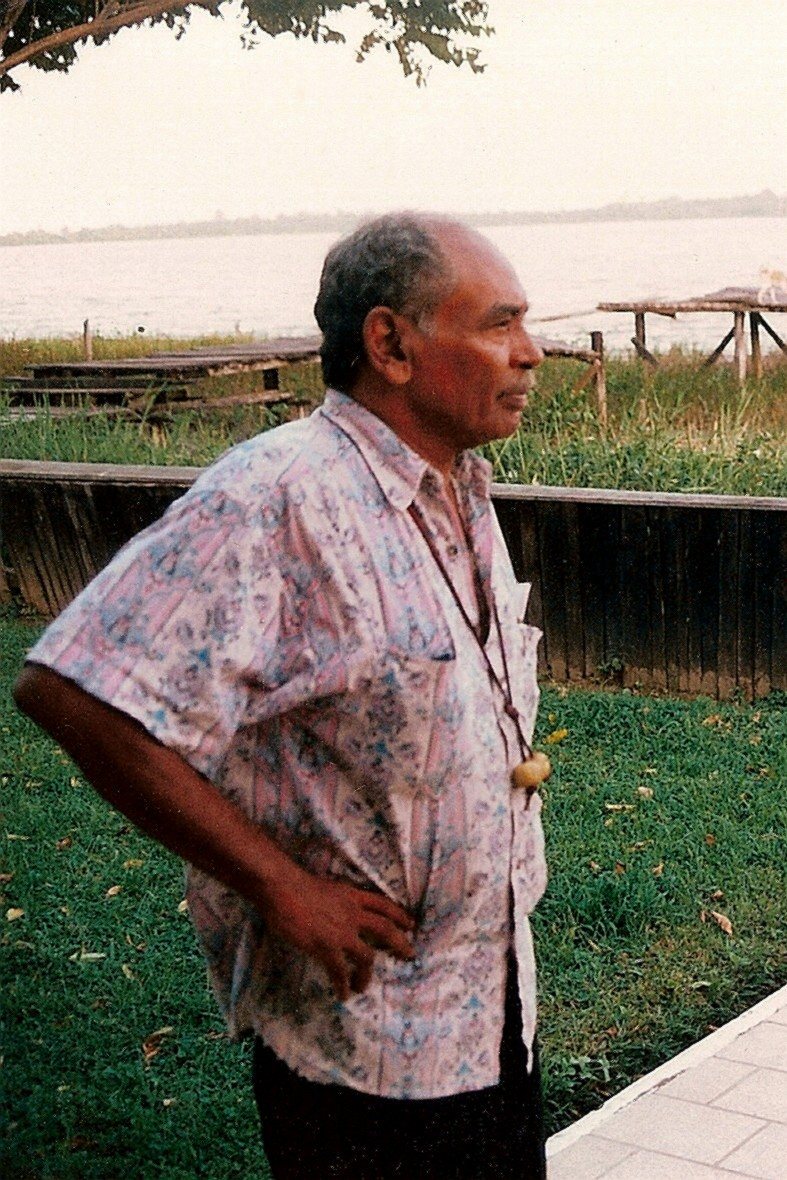
Erwin de Vries

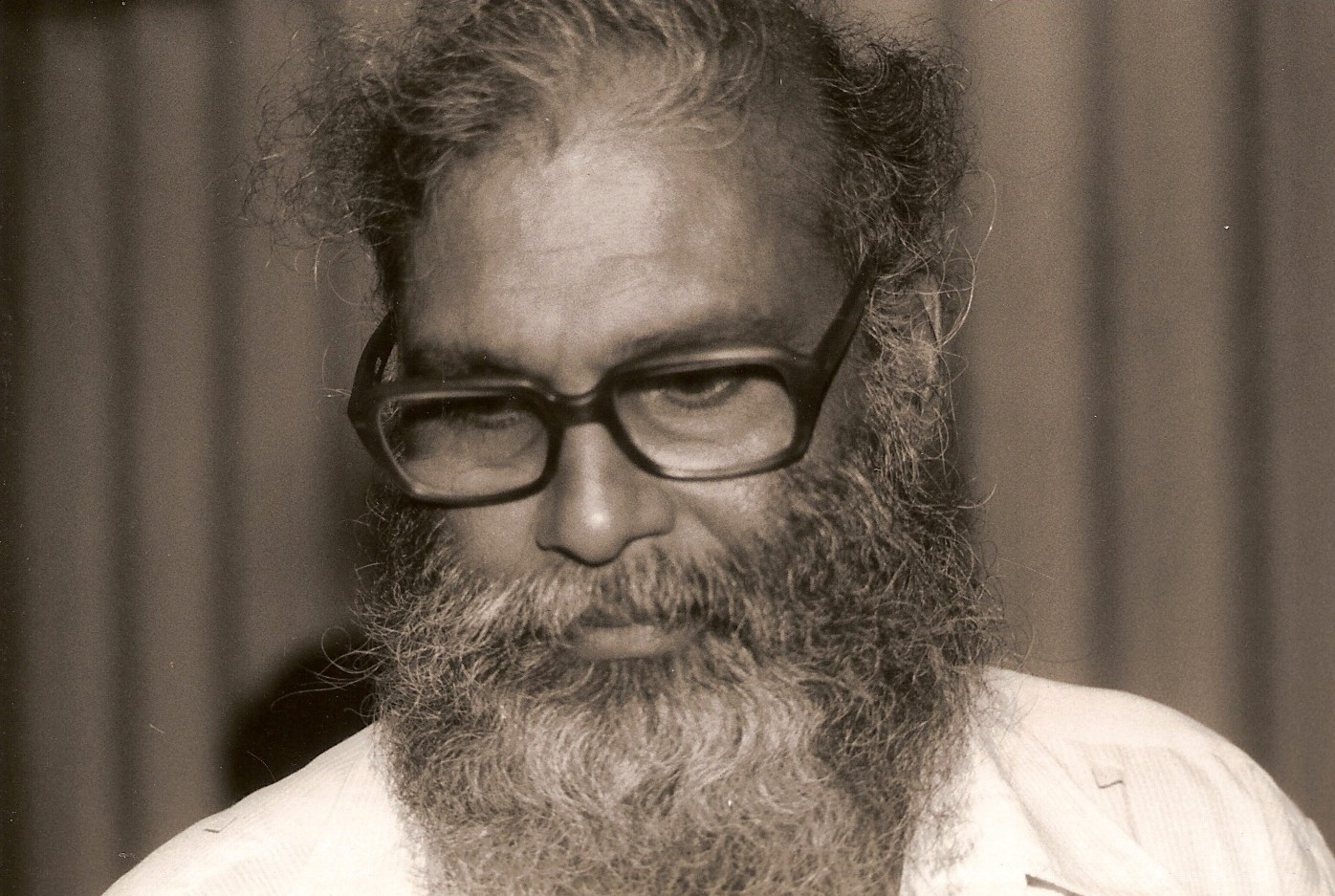
James Ramlall aka Bhai

- 31 January – Erwin de Vries, painter and sculptor (b. 1929).
- 19 December – James Ramlall, or Bhai, poet (b. 1935).
