= 2016 in Suriname =

- Decades: 1990s; 2000s; 2010s; 2020s
- See also: Other events of 2016; History of Suriname

Events in the year 2016 in Suriname.

== Incumbents ==
- President: Dési Bouterse
- Vice President: Ashwin Adhin
- Speaker: Jennifer Simons

== Events ==
=== Sport ===
- 5-21 August – Suriname at the 2016 Summer Olympics: six competitors in four sports

== Deaths ==
- 19 January – Max Nijman, singer (b. 1941).
- 13 November – Aloysius Ferdinandus Zichem, Roman Catholic bishop (b. 1933).
