= 2022 in Suriname =

- Decades: 2000s; 2010s; 2020s
- See also: Other events of 2022; History of Suriname

Events in the year 2022 in Suriname.

== Incumbents ==
- President: Chan Santokhi
- Vice President: Ronnie Brunswijk
- Speaker: Marinus Bee

== Events ==
Ongoing — COVID-19 pandemic in Suriname

== Deaths ==
- 11 June – Hein Eersel, 100, academic administrator, chancellor of the University of Suriname (1968–1988)
