= 2017 in Suriname =

- Decades: 1990s; 2000s; 2010s; 2020s
- See also: Other events of 2017; History of Suriname

Events from the year 2017 in Suriname

== Incumbents ==
- President: Dési Bouterse
- Vice President: Ashwin Adhin
- Speaker: Jennifer Simons
