= Van Genderen =

Van Genderen may refer to:

== People ==
- Olton van Genderen (1921–1990), Surinamese Deputy Prime Minister

== Planets ==
- 6751 van Genderen, a minor planet
