= 2019 in Suriname =

- Decades: 1990s; 2000s; 2010s; 2020s
- See also: Other events of 2019; History of Suriname

Events in the year 2019 in Suriname.

== Incumbents ==
- President: Dési Bouterse
- Vice President: Ashwin Adhin
- Speaker: Jennifer Simons

== Deaths ==
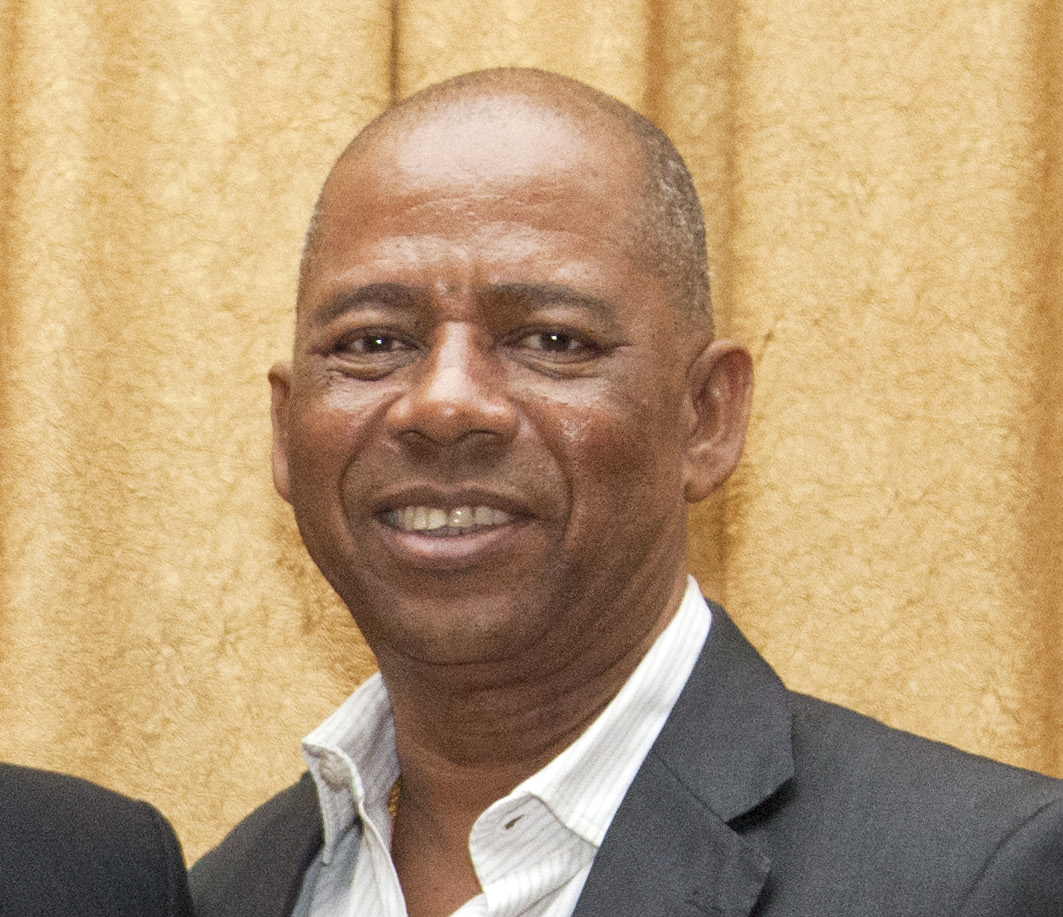
Winston Lackin

- 6 January – Bea Vianen, writer (b. 1935).
- 7 August – Orlando Grootfaam, footballer (b. 1974).
- 11 November – Winston Lackin, politician (b. 1954).
