= 2021 in Suriname =

- Decades: 2000s; 2010s; 2020s
- See also: Other events of 2021; History of Suriname

Events in the year 2021 in Suriname.

== Incumbents ==
- President: Chan Santokhi
- Vice President: Ronnie Brunswijk
- Speaker: Marinus Bee

== Events ==
Ongoing — COVID-19 pandemic in Suriname

== Deaths ==
- 3 February – Asraf Peerkhan, 74, football executive.
- 21 March – Shahied Wagid Hosain, singer (born c.1961).
