= Soerdj Badrising =

Surinamese politician

Soerdjpersad Badrising (Suriname district, February 2, 1940), also known as Soerdj Badrising, is a former Surinamese politician and administrator. From 1977 to 1980 he was the Minister of Justice and Police.

After his education at the Algemene Middelbare School (AMS) in Paramaribo, he left for the Netherlands where he passed the HBS diploma in 1962 at the Stevin HBS in The Hague. After obtaining his MO-B mathematics certificate in 1967, he returned to his homeland. Badrising became a teacher at the Surinamese Kweekschool and a year later he became deputy director there. Badrising was also a member of the board of the AMS. In 1970 he was appointed director of the Openbaar Atheneum. He was also active in politics. In 1973, for example, he was one of the founders of the Hindustani party HPP. After a conflict with the Ministry of Education and Public Development, he resigned as director in 1977, but continued as a mathematics teacher. Later that year he was appointed Minister of Justice and Police. Shortly after the military coup on February 25, 1980, he was arrested while Prime Minister Henck Arron was still in hiding. Minister Badrising and Deputy Prime Minister Olton van Genderen signed the statement for the transfer of power to the military. After the return of democracy, he no longer played an important political role.
