= 2024 in Suriname =

- Decades: 2000s; 2010s; 2020s
- See also: Other events of 2024; History of Suriname

Events in the year 2024 in Suriname.

== Incumbents ==
- President: Chan Santokhi
- Vice President: Ronnie Brunswijk
- Speaker: Marinus Bee

== Events ==
- 2 October – President Chan Santokhi announces a $10 billion project titled GrandMorgu between the French energy firm TotalEnergies, the US-based APA Corporation and the state oil company Staatsolie Maatschappij Suriname to extract an estimated 700 million barrels of the coast of Suriname.

== Holidays ==
- 1 January – New Year's Day
- 10 February – Chinese New Year
- 25 March – Phagwah
- 29 March – Good Friday
- 31 March - Easter Sunday
- 1 April - Easter Monday
- 10 April – Eid al-Fitr
- 1 May – Labour Day
- 16 June – Eid al-Adha
- 1 July – Ketikoti (Emancipation Day – end of slavery)
- 9 August – Indigenous People's Day
- 10 October – Day of the Maroons
- 1 November – Diwali
- 25 November – Independence Day
- 25 December – Christmas Day
- 26 December – Boxing Day

== Deaths ==
- 24 December – Dési Bouterse, chair of the National Military Council (1980–1987) and president (2010–2020).
