= 2023 in Suriname =

- Decades: 2000s; 2010s; 2020s
- See also: Other events of 2023; History of Suriname

Events in the year 2023 in Suriname.

== Incumbents ==
- President: Chan Santokhi
- Vice President: Ronnie Brunswijk
- Speaker: Marinus Bee

== Events ==
Ongoing COVID-19 pandemic in Suriname

- 20 November: Ten people are killed during a gold mine collapse in Suriname.
- 20 December: Dési Bouterse, former president of Suriname, is sentenced to 20 years in prison for the December murders of 1982.

== Deaths ==
- 15 January - Dilip Sardjoe, 73, businessman and politician.
