= Grote Stadskerk =

Church building in Paramaribo, Suriname

- Mamakerki
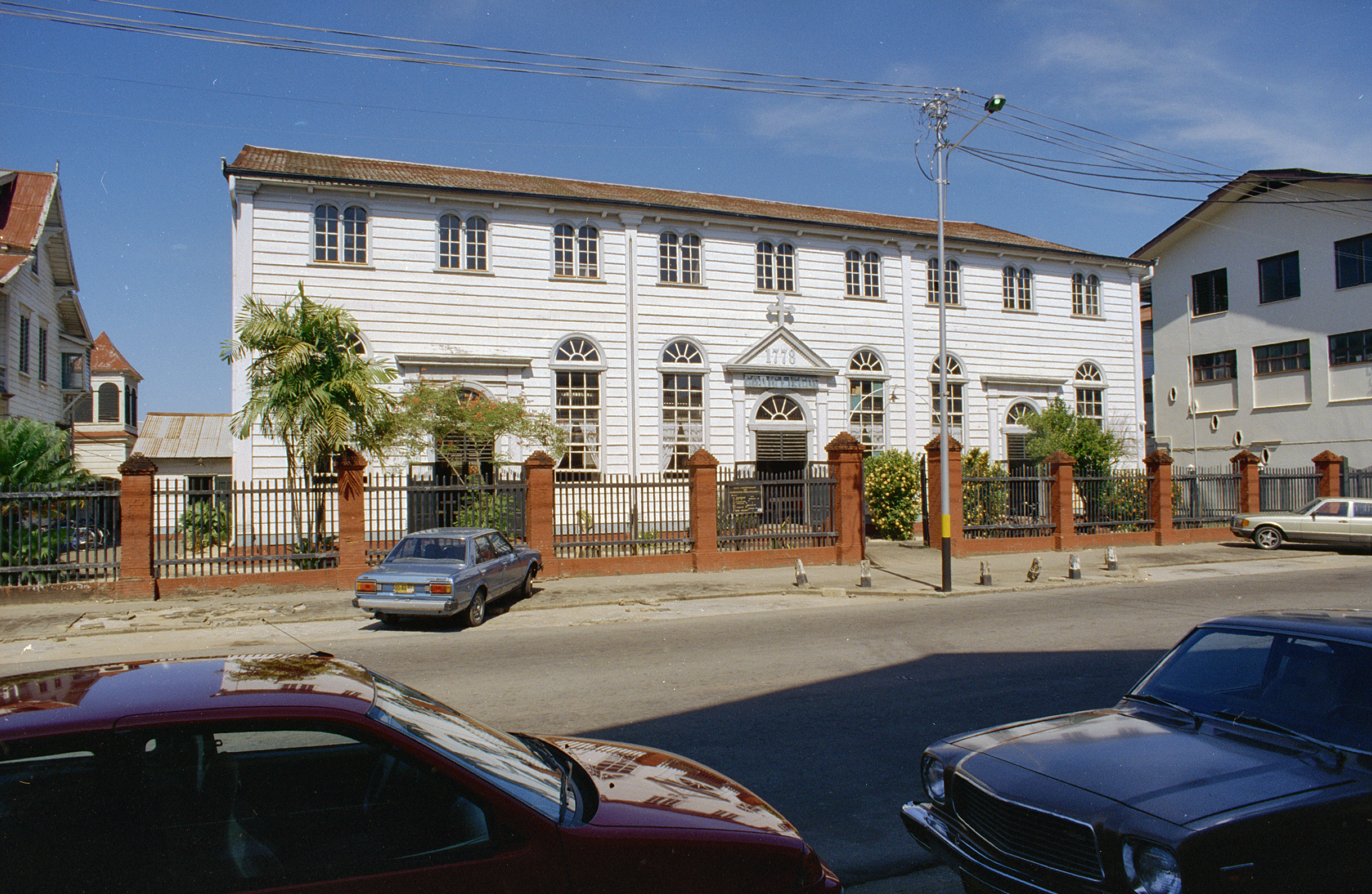
- Front façade of the Grote Stadskerk (Large City Church)

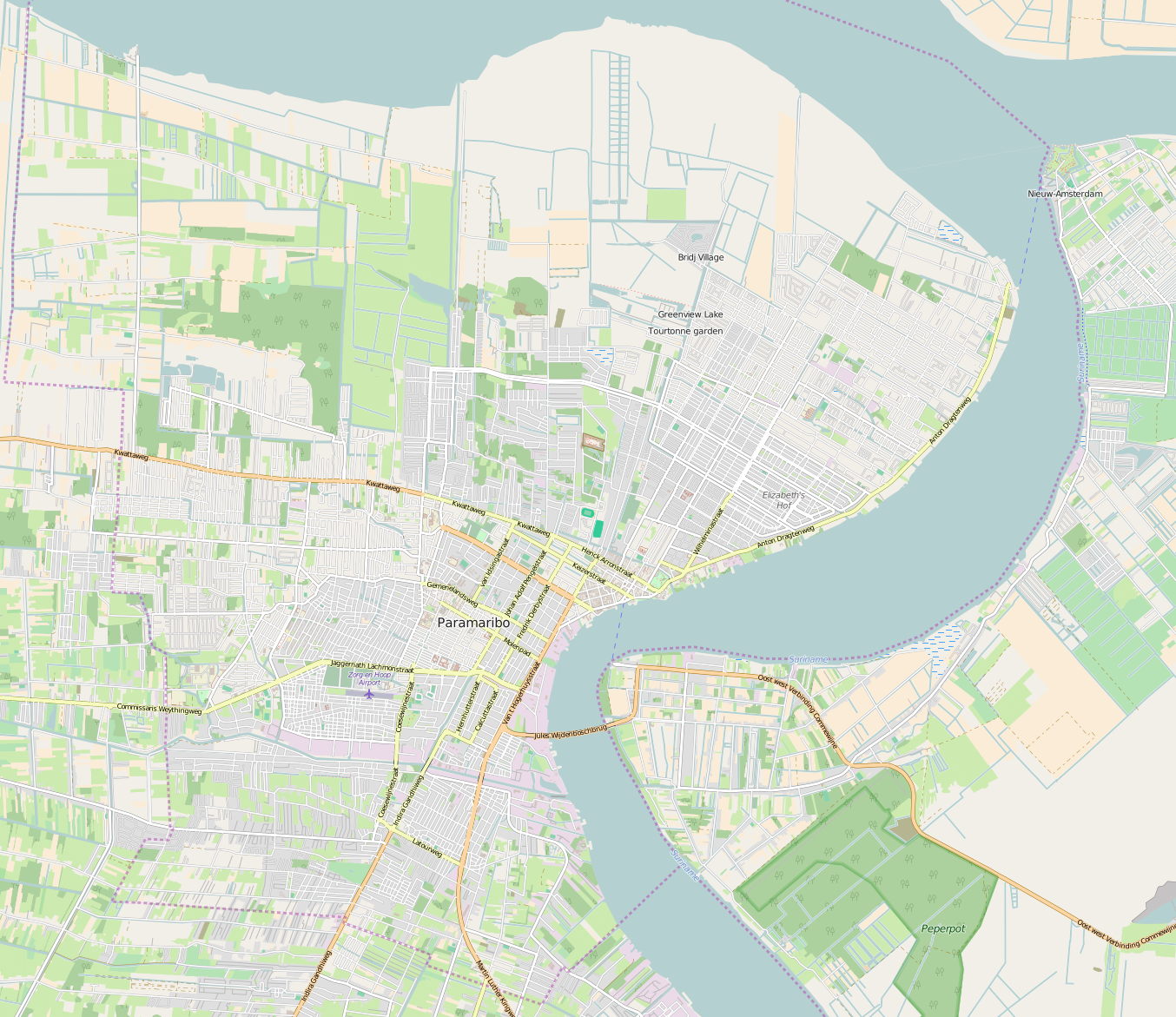
- Location within Paramaribo

Religion
- Affiliation: Moravian Church
- Year consecrated: 21 July 1828

Location
- Location: Paramaribo, Suriname
- Interactive map of Grote Stadskerk
- Coordinates: 05°49′31″N 55°09′39″W

Architecture
- Groundbreaking: 21 July 1827

Specifications
- Length: 30 m (98 ft)
- Width: 19 m (62 ft)
- Materials: wood

Grote Stadskerk (Sranan Tongo: Mamakerki) is a church of the Moravian Church. It is located on Steenbakkerijstraat in the historic centre of Paramaribo, Suriname. The building is a monument. The Grote Stadskerk is the first, and the largest church of the Moravian congregation in Suriname.

== History ==
The Moravian Church was given permission by the Society of Suriname to embark on missionary activities among the slave population in Suriname. The first missionaries arrived on 7 August 1735. They were not supported by the government, and were initially not allowed to open a church.

== Building ==
On 27 February 1767, an office for the mission was built on Steenbakkerijstraat. The attic was used as a church, but soon became too small for the congregation. On 31 May 1778, a first church was inaugurated on the site where the Grote Stadskerk now stands. By 1827, the decision was taken to build a completely new church to accommodate the growing numbers of church members. The foundation stone for this was laid on 21 July 1827. The consecration of the finished building took place on 21 July 1828. The building was enlarged several times during the 19th century, and reached its current size in 1847.

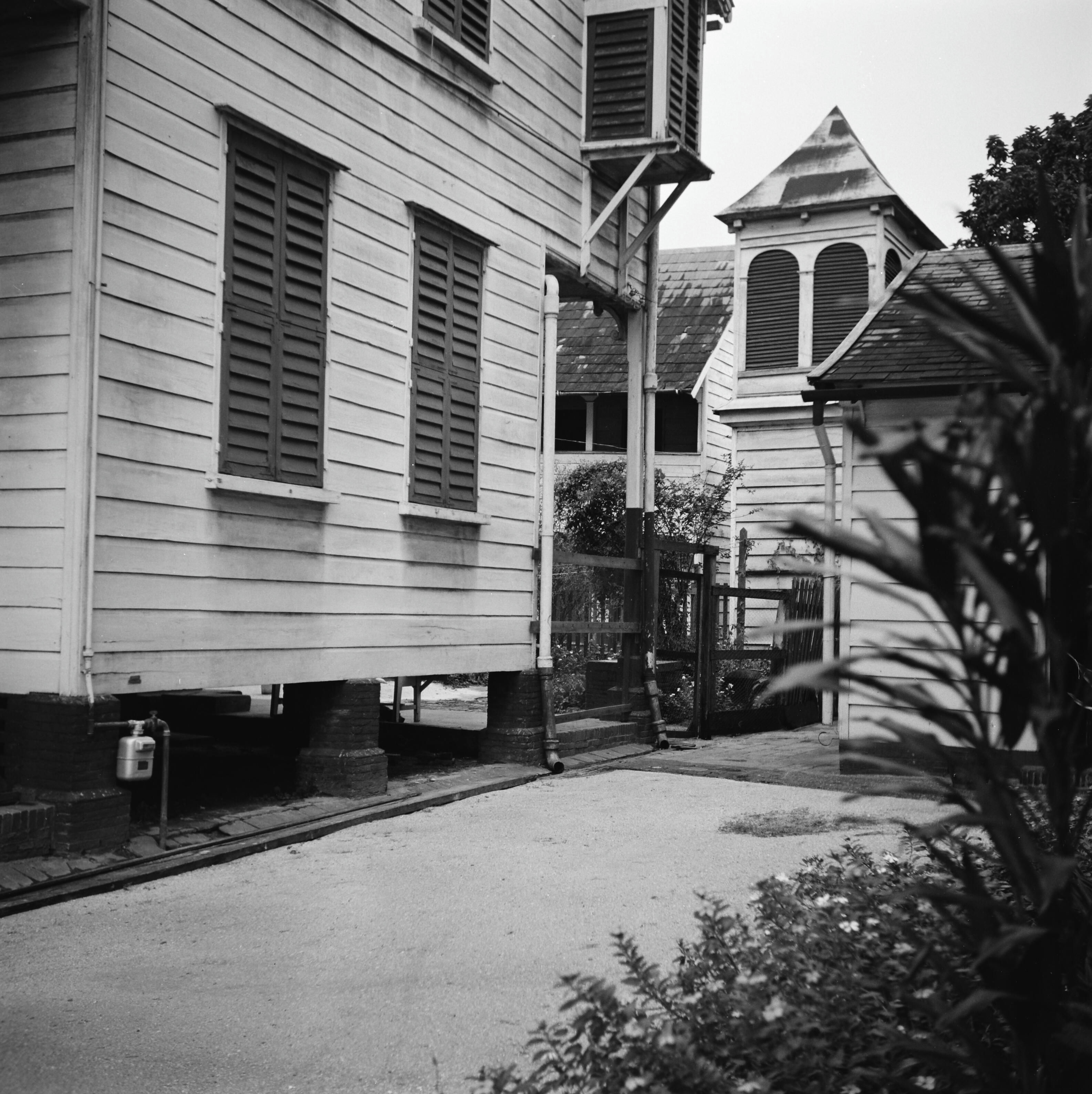
Church tower hidden on the terrain

The church is 30 metres (98 ft) long and 19 metres (62 ft) wide. The rear façade has very large shutters. On the inside, the nave is 11 metres (36 ft) tall, with two levels of galleries along the walls. The interior is predominantly white. On 27 May 1870, the organ was delivered. There is a separate church tower with bells on the site. The grounds surrounding the church also include a rectory, church offices, and a guest house.

Initially, the church did not have its own cemetery. Between 1767 and 1776, fifteen missionaries and children were buried behind the church. In 1851, a memorial was placed at the site.

The congregation of the church consisted mainly of slaves and freed slaves. On the day before the emancipation of slavery, 30 June 1863, the Grote Stadskerk was completely decorated in flowers and was at the heart of the celebrations. At the 2012 census, the Moravian Church was the second largest Protestant denomination with 60,420 members.
