= Ulrich Aron =

Former Suriname politician (1944/1945–2025)

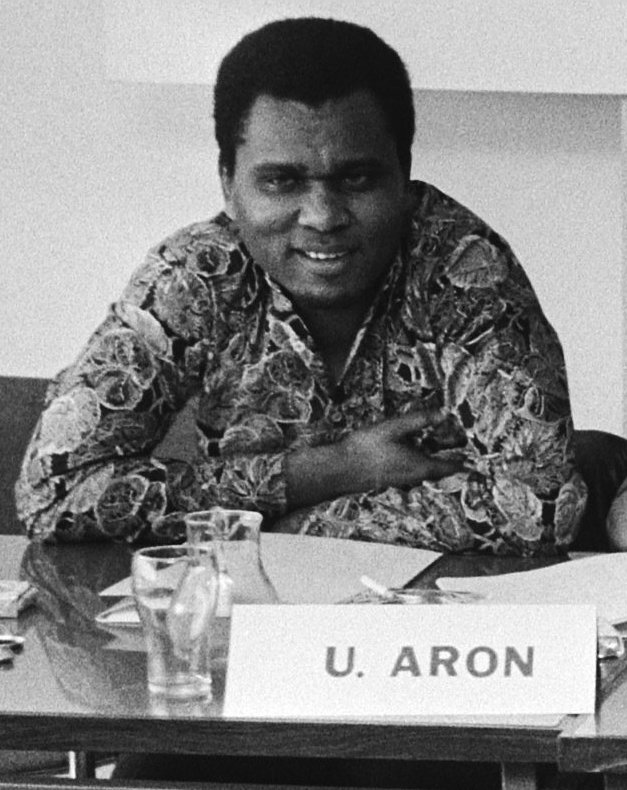
- Ulrich Aron in 1979

Chairperson of the National Assembly of Suriname
- In office 15 January 1986 – 10 December 1987
- Preceded by: Assembly dismissed from 1980; Emile Wijntuin
- Succeeded by: Jagernath Lachmon

Personal details
- Born: Ulrich Edward Aron; 1944 or 1945 Surinam (now Suriname)
- Died: 20 April 2025 (aged 80) Paramaribo, Suriname
- Party: NDP
- Occupation: Politician

Ulrich Edward Aron (1944 or 1945 – 20 April 2025) was a Surinamese politician who served as Chairman of the National Assembly of Suriname from 1986 until the aftermath of the 1987 Surinamese general election, under the military regime of Dési Bouterse. Aron was a member of the National Democratic Party (NDP).

== Life and career ==
Aron was a public administrator and fellow student of Jules Wijdenbosch. Before Dutch Suriname became independent at the end of 1975, he was director of the Dutch foundation 'Back to Suriname' (Tenasu), which supported Surinamese people in the Netherlands when they returned to Suriname.

Led by Lt. Col. Bouterse, the Surinamese Armed Forces (SKM) seized power on 25 February 1980 in a coup d'état. Shortly before or after the December murders in 1982, Aron returned to Suriname and was subsequently appointed District Commissioner of Marowijne. Aron became a member of the 'February 25 Movement' (VFB) (Note: Future National Democratic Party (NDP).) and as such became the Chairman of the National Assembly of Suriname in January 1986. The parliament then consisted of 31 members: 14 appointed by the military (including Aron), 11 by the trade unions and 6 by the employers. During that period, Aron was actively involved in drafting a new constitution to replace the 1975 constitution.

The first general election after the 1980 coup d'état was held in November 1987, signaling the restoration of democracy. A month later, Jagernath Lachmon became the Chairman of the National Assembly. During the 1996–2000 presidency of Wijdenbosch, Aron was appointed chairman of the Court of Audit of Suriname in 1998, which he would remain until 2008.

Later he was active as chairman of the Political Documentation Center (PolDoc) foundation which is also the publisher of the book Sabi yu sten: choose consciously, written by him. In addition, he was founder and chairman of the Institute for Administrative Civil Service Training in Suriname (IBAS). He was also part of the Tripartite Consultation, which was established by a decree of President Bouterse on March 23, 2011. This consultation was composed of representatives from the government, the business community and workers' organisations.

Aron died following a brief illness in Paramaribo, on 20 April 2025, at the age of 80.

== Notes ==
Political offices
Preceded by Assembly dismissed from 1980; Emile Wijntuin	Chairperson of the National Assembly of Suriname; 1986–1987	Succeeded by Jagernath Lachmon
