= Patricia Etnel =

Surinamese politician (1976–2025)

Patricia Etnel Lemmob
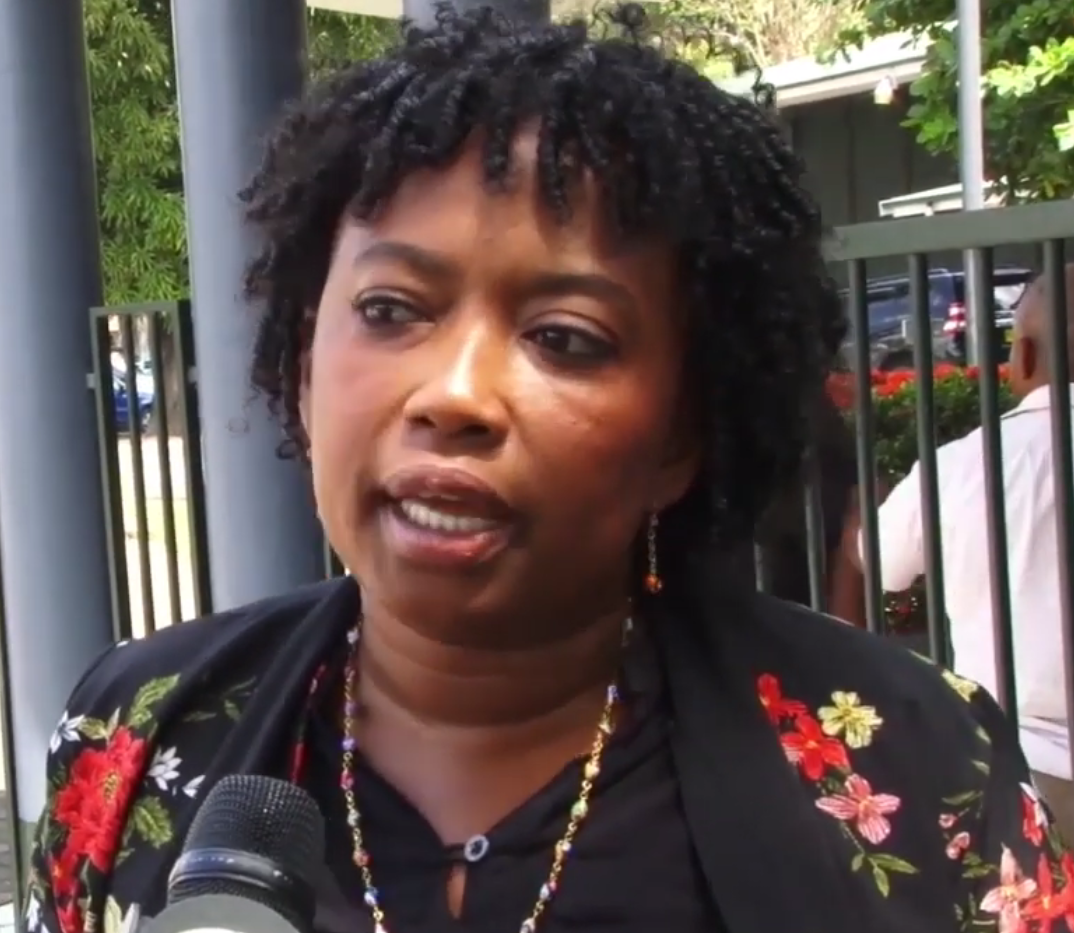
- Etnel in 2018

Member of the National Assembly of Suriname
- In office 25 May 2015 – 22 June 2025

Personal details
- Born: Patricia Nancy Etnel; 17 June 1976 Paramaribo, Suriname
- Died: 22 June 2025 (aged 49) Paramaribo, Suriname
- Political party: NPS
- Education: Anton de Kom University of Suriname; FHR Institute
- Occupation: Journalist, politician

Patricia Nancy Lemmob (née Etnel; 17 June 1976 – 22 June 2025), known as Patricia Etnel, was a Surinamese journalist and politician who was a member of the National Party of Suriname, she served in the National Assembly from 2015 to 2025. She died in Paramaribo on 22 June 2025, at the age of 49.
