= COVID-19 pandemic in the Cayman Islands =

Ongoing COVID-19 viral pandemic in the Cayman Islands

- Disease: COVID-19
- Pathogen: SARS-CoV-2
- Location: Cayman Islands
- Arrival date: 12 March 2020 (6 years, 2 months and 6 days)
- Confirmed cases: 31,472
- Recovered: 31,435
- Deaths: 37
- Fatality rate: 0.12%

Government website
- https://www.exploregov.ky/coronavirus

The COVID-19 pandemic in Cayman Islands was a part of the ongoing global viral pandemic of coronavirus disease 2019 (COVID-19), which was confirmed to have reached the British Overseas Territory of the Cayman Islands in March 2020.

== Background ==
On 12 January 2020, the World Health Organization (WHO) announced that a novel coronavirus was the cause of a respiratory illness in a cluster of people in Wuhan City, Hubei Province, China, which was reported to the WHO on 31 December 2019.

The case fatality ratio for COVID-19 has been much lower than SARS of 2003, but the transmission has been significantly greater, with a significant total death toll. From 19 March 2020, Public Health England no longer classified COVID-19 as a "High consequence infectious disease".

== Timeline ==
Cases

Deaths

On 26 February 2020, Mexican authorities granted permission for a cruise ship registered in Malta to dock in Cozumel, Quintana Roo, because the ship was carrying a passenger presumed to be infected with the coronavirus. The ship was previously denied access to ports in Jamaica and the Cayman Islands. Two cases of flu were found.

On 12 March 2020, a 68-year-old Italian man in critical condition, who was transferred from the cruise ship Costa Luminosa to a hospital in the Cayman Islands on 29 February due to heart issues, was announced as the first confirmed coronavirus case. His death was announced two days later.

In August 2020, after community transmission was eliminated, most restrictions, including face mask requirements, were dropped.

On 15 November 2020, a second COVID-19 death occurred. The person was a resident of the Cayman Islands who had tested positive after returning from travelling abroad and remained in isolation for some time. After the person's symptoms worsened, they were admitted to the Cayman Islands Hospital on 4 October. It was stated by the Ministry of Health that the person fell into the category of persons at a high risk of developing COVID-19 complications.

On 17 December 2020, Mercer University pre-med student Skylar Mack, 18 years old, of Loganville, Georgia, in the United States, and her boyfriend Vanjae Ramgeet, 24 years old, of the Cayman Islands, were sentenced to four months in prison for her violating the island's mandatory two-week quarantine COVID-19 restriction two days after arriving from the United States, and for him aiding and abetting her. She had called the health department to have her location tracker bracelet loosened the day before her breach, and she subsequently removed it. Judge Roger Chapple said during their sentencing that the decision to violate safety measures was born of "selfishness and arrogance," and that Mack spent seven hours in public at a crowded event without a face mask or social distancing. Three hundred cases and two COVID deaths had been reported in the country to that point in time. The sentence was later reduced to two months. On 15 January 2021, she was released from prison.

Despite the pandemic, a general election were held on 26 May 2021. Sabrina Turner became health minister.

On September 24, 2021, despite a high vaccination rate, the islands reintroduced pandemic restrictions including mandatory wearing of face masks indoors and gathering restrictions, due to a massive spike in locally transmitted cases. Over 10% of the islands' population would go on to be infected after this, despite the islands largely keeping the pandemic out before this time.

== See also ==
- Caribbean Public Health Agency
- COVID-19 pandemic in North America
- COVID-19 pandemic by country and territory
