= Noël Martin =

British activist (1959–2020)

Noël Martin (1959 – 14 July 2020) was a Jamaican-born British man, victim of a neo-Nazi attack in 1996. On 16 June 1996 in Brandenburg, Germany, he was attacked because of his dark skin by neo-Nazis. A block of concrete was thrown through the windshield of his car and his car veered off the road and struck a tree.

Martin became a quadriplegic as a result of the attack, and required 24-hour care. Having outlived his wife, he announced his intention to seek assisted suicide, to take place in Berlin, as a result. His first announcement, in 2006, set 23 June 2007 as the date of his suicide. As of December 2007 he had made arrangements with a doctor through the Swiss organization Dignitas.

A documentary film about Martin, The Finishing Line, directed and produced by Estephan Wagner, was due to be shown on Channel 4 in August 2009. However, Martin objected to the inclusion of two scenes (referred to in court as the "hoisting" and "song" scenes), and sought an injunction against Channel 4 preventing them from broadcasting it. In November 2009, Mr Justice Eady rejected Martin's application.

Martin died on 14 July 2020, at the age of 60.
