= Dagblad Suriname =

Daily Surinamese newspaper

Dagblad Suriname is one of the leading daily Surinamese newspapers. It is published in the Dutch language in Paramaribo. Dagblad was founded in 2002, and is part of FaFam Publishing N.V. The newspaper has been described as centre left.
