= Olton van Genderen =

Surinamese politician (1921–1990)

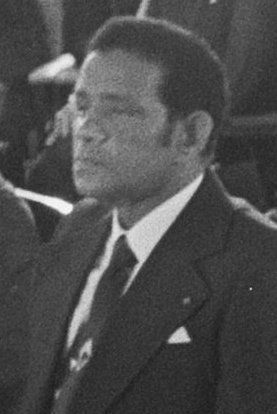
- van Genderen in 1975

Deputy Prime Minister of Suriname
- In office 24 December 1973 – 25 February 1980
- Prime Minister: Henck Arron
- Preceded by: Harry Radhakishun
- Succeeded by: André Haakmat

Minister of the Interior
- In office 28 December 1977 – 25 February 1980
- Preceded by: office established
- Succeeded by: Frank Leeflang

Chairman of the Estates of Suriname
- In office 16 May 1967 – 1 September 1969
- Preceded by: Jagernath Lachmon
- Succeeded by: Clemens Rimkisoen Biswabitre
- In office 15 December 1973 – 28 December 1973
- Preceded by: Jagernath Lachmon
- Succeeded by: Emile Wijntuin

Personal details
- Born: Olton Willem van Genderen; 17 October 1921 Albina, Suriname
- Died: 9 November 1990 (aged 69) Paramaribo, Suriname
- Party: National Party of Suriname

Olton Willem van Genderen (17 October 1921 – 9 November 1990) was a Surinamese civil servant and politician. He served as Deputy Prime Minister of Suriname from 24 December 1973 until the coup d'état of 25 February 1980. He was one of the main negotiators for the Independence of Suriname.

== Biography ==
Van Genderen was born on 17 October 1921, in Albina, Suriname. He worked for the customs agency. In the 1950s, he spent four years in Rotterdam and became a licensed customs officer.

Van Genderen became active in the trade union and politics. He was given the honorary title Da Djendé (Ndyuka: Beautiful teacher). In 1958, he was first elected to the Estates of Suriname, and was re-elected five times. On 16 May 1967, he was elected Chairman of the Estates of Suriname, and served until 1 September 1969.

On 15 December 1973, he was re-elected as Chairman, however he resigned on 28 December, because on 24 December, he had been elected as Deputy Prime Minister of Suriname in the Arron cabinet. He also served as Minister of District Administration and Decentralisation.

The Arron government was in dialogue with the Dutch government about the Independence of Suriname, and van Genderen became one of the main negotiators. On 25 November 1975, Suriname became an independent country. In 1977, he was appointed Minister of the Interior which was the successor of Ministry of District Administration and Decentralisation.

On 25 February 1980, Desi Bouterse committed a coup d'état. Arron went into hiding, however van Genderen was captured. On 26 February, van Genderen and Minister Badrising announced the surrender of the government on television, and asked the population not to resist the military regime. On 28 February, Arron surrendered to the regime. Van Genderen was placed under house arrest until February 1981. On 19 June 1981, van Genderen was sentenced to four months imprisonment minus time served under house arrest, and a total fine of ƒ 55,000.

Van Genderen died on 9 November 1990, aged 69, in Paramaribo.

== Honours and legacy ==
- Suriname: Commander in the Honorary Order of the Yellow Star.
- Netherlands: Officer in the Order of Orange-Nassau (1967).
- Venezuela: Knight in the Order of Francisco de Miranda.

In 2021, the Emmastraat in Albina was renamed Olton Willem van Genderen Boulevard in his honour.
