= List of chairmen of the Estates of Suriname =

Chairman of Estates of Suriname
- Voorzitter van De Staten van Suriname
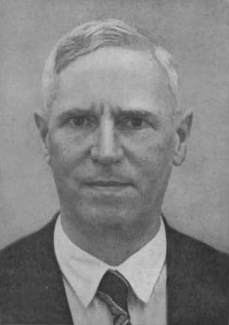
- Longest serving officeholder Karel Johannes van Erpecum; 14 May 1935 – 6 April 1942
- Seat: Paramaribo
- Appointer: Estates of Suriname
- Formation: 14 May 1935; 91 years ago
- First holder: Karel Johannes van Erpecum
- Final holder: Emile Wijntuin
- Abolished: 25 November 1975; 50 years ago
- Succession: Chairman of the National Assembly of Suriname

The chairman of the Estates of Suriname (Dutch: Voorzitter van De Staten) was the presiding officer of the Estates of Suriname.

== List of chairmen ==
The following is a complete list of office-holders from 1935 to 1975:

Political parties

National Party of Suriname (NPS)
Surinamese Democratic Party (SDP)
Progressive Reform Party (VHP)
Progressive Surinamese People's Party (PSV)
Independent

No.	Portrait	Name (Birth–Death)	Term of office			Political party
No.	Portrait	Name (Birth–Death)	Took office	Left office	Time in office	Political party
1		Karel Johannes van Erpecum (1881–1963)	14 May 1935	6 April 1942	6 years, 327 days	Independent
2		Julius del Prado (1886–1945)	7 April 1942	8 October 1943	1 year, 184 days	Independent
3		Gerrit Fikkert (1911–2008)	25 October 1943	4 April 1944	162 days	Independent
(2)		Julius del Prado (1886–1945)	4 April 1944	31 March 1945	361 days	Independent
4		Frederik Lim A Po (1900–1957)	3 April 1945	31 March 1947	1 year, 362 days	NPS
5		Henry Lucien de Vries (1909–1987)	1 April 1947	6 January 1949	1 year, 280 days	
6		Gerard van der Schroeff (1913–2000)	22 March 1949	1 April 1951	2 years, 10 days	NPS
(4)		Frederik Lim A Po (1900–1957)	10 May 1951	6 May 1953	1 year, 361 days	NPS
7		Huerta Milano Celvius Bergen (1915–1994?)	15 May 1953	3 January 1955	1 year, 233 days	NPS
8		Johan Adolf Pengel (1916–1970)	26 January 1955	9 May 1955	103 days	NPS
9		Hendrik Carel van Ommeren (1896–1996)	14 May 1955	28 January 1957	1 year, 259 days	NPS
10		Stuart Harry Axwijk (1920–1961)	7 February 1957	9 July 1958	1 year, 152 days	SDP
11		Johan Kraag (1913–1996)	16 July 1958	14 May 1963	4 years, 304 days	NPS
12		Emile de la Fuente (1898–1977)	30 May 1963	6 January 1964	221 days	NPS
13		Jagernath Lachmon (1916–2001)	28 February 1964	11 May 1967	3 years, 72 days	VHP
14		Olton van Genderen (1913–1990)	16 May 1967	1 September 1969	2 years, 108 days	NPS
15		Clemens Ramkisoen Biswamitre (1897–1980)	1 September 1969	18 November 1969	78 days	SDP
(13)		Jagernath Lachmon (1916–2001)	18 November 1969	15 December 1973	4 years, 27 days	VHP
(14)		Olton van Genderen (1913–1990)	15 December 1973	28 December 1973	13 days	NPS
16		Emile Wijntuin (1924–2020)	28 December 1973	25 November 1975	1 year, 332 days	PSV

== See also ==
- List of chairmen of the National Assembly of Suriname
- List of colonial governors of Suriname
