= Ángela Salazar =

Colombian activist (1954–2020)

María Ángela Salazar Murillo (Tadó, 1954 – Apartadó, 7 August 2020) was a Colombian activist of African descent, member of the Commission for Truth.

== Education ==
Salazar studied Community Work and Social Support at the SENA of Urabá and specialized in Human Talent Management in the same school.

== Career ==
Her work was primarily focused on improving the rights of small-scale banana producers in Urabá. This included making the city's child workers literate. She also worked with the demobilization of the Guerrillas and Self-Defense Forces in the region, helping former combatants to commit to the peace process. She was co-founder of the Casa de la Mujer in Apartadó, formed in 1996, and was also a member of the Community Action Board of Barrio Obrero and of the Women's Committee from 1996 to 2006. She was also co-founder of the Association of Women of Apartadó in 2000, from the Urabá Women's Network in 2001, national representative in the IMP Women for Peace Initiative since 2001 and co-founder of the Public Women's Network in 2005 and the Departmental Board of Victims of the Civil Society of Antioquia in 2007. She worked as Political Coordinator of Antioquia for IMP and a volunteer for the Córdoba - Urabá - Darién Development and Peace Program. She worked to seek peace and justice, directly documenting 550 cases, mainly of women victims of the Self-Defense Forces in Urabá, Córdoba and Chocó.

Salazar was nominated three times for the Antioqueña de Oro Award. Recognizing the importance of her work, the Mayor of Apartadó gave her the Bacota Dorada in recognition of her work and civic leadership in 2017.

== Death ==
Salazar died on 7 August 2020, at age 66, of COVID-19, during the pandemic in Colombia.
