= Victor Batista Falla =

Cuban editor (1933–2020)

Víctor Batista Falla
- Born: January 21, 1933; Havana, Cuba
- Died: 12 April 2020 (aged 87); Havana, Cuba
- Occupation: Publisher

Víctor Batista Falla (21 January 1933 – 12 April 2020) was a Cuban editor and publisher.

== Biography ==
Batista's father, Agustín Batista y González de Mendoza (1899–1968), was the major owner of the Trust Company of Cuba, the most powerful Cuban bank prior to the Cuban Revolution (founded in 1905). His mother, María Teresa Falla Bonet, was the daughter of Laureano Falla Gutiérrez, a powerful sugar tycoon. He was also the uncle of Maria Teresa, Grand Duchess of Luxembourg.

Batista fled Cuba following the Cuban Revolution and settled in New York City. In the United States, he financed the creation of the magazine Exilio, intended for publishing young writers in exile. He then founded the Colibrí publishing house in Madrid on the proposal of Jesús Díaz. He lived there for most of the remainder of his life.

After 60 years in exile, Batista returned to Cuba in April 2020, where he contracted COVID-19 and died in Havana.
