= Soeki Irodikromo =

Surinamese painter (1945–2020)

Soekidjan Irodikromo (20 June 1945 – 18 August 2020) was a Surinamese painter and ceramics artist. He was born in Plantage Pieterszorg, Commewijne District. Along with Erwin de Vries, Ruben Karsters, Rudi de la Fuente, and Paul Woei, he was one of a number of Surinamese artists to have emerged during the 1960s. Stylistically, his work owes a good deal to the COBRA movement, and uses themes from Javanese mythology.
