= Miguel Ángel Tábet =

Venezuelan theologian (1941–2020)

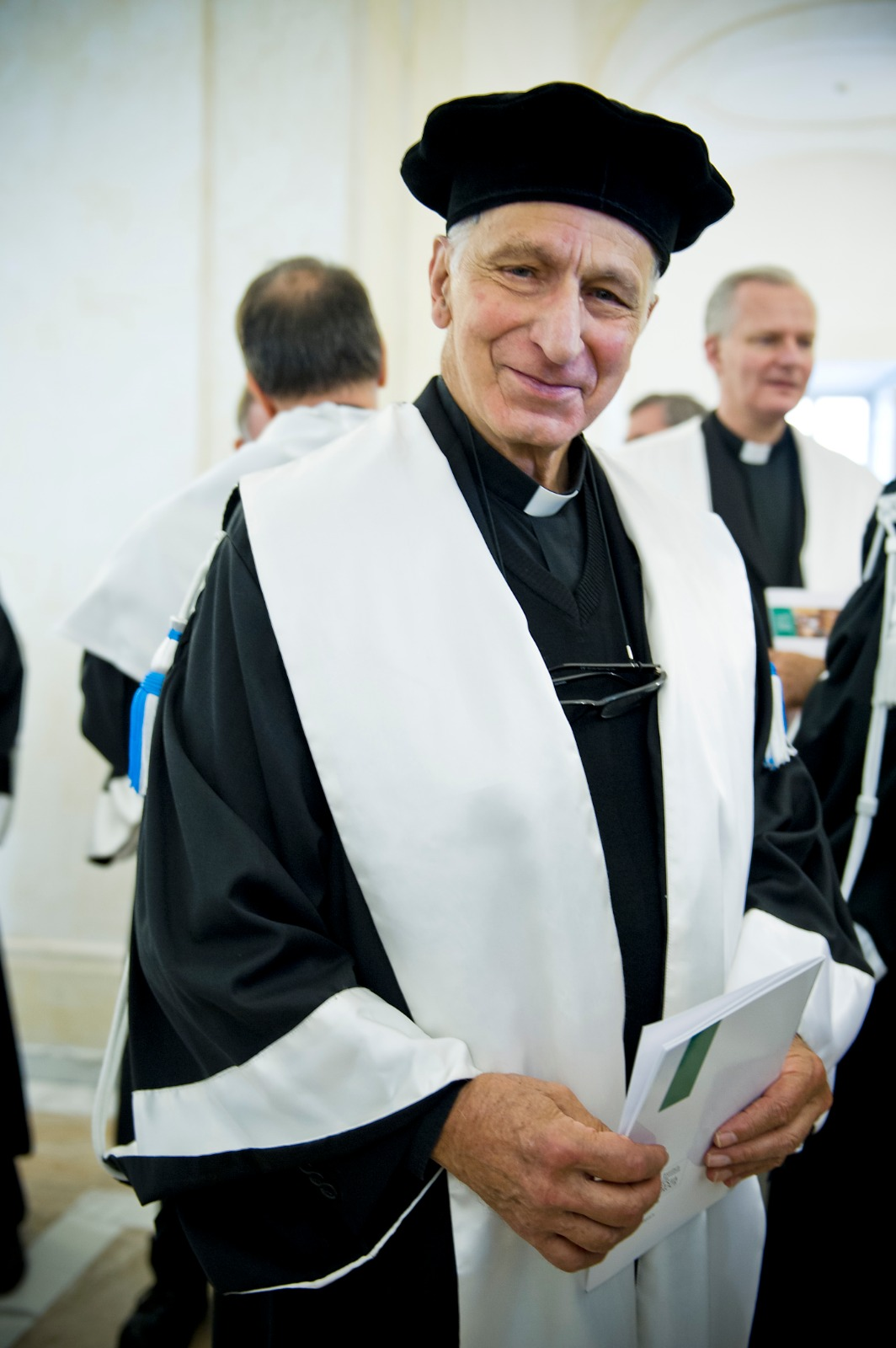
- Miguel Ángel Tábet in 2019
- Born: 24 December 1941; Caracas, Venezuela
- Died: 7 April 2020 (aged 78); Rome, Italy
- Education: Colegio La Salle; Central University of Venezuela; Pontifical Lateran University

Miguel Ángel Tabet Balady (24 December 1941 – 7 April 2020) was a Venezuelan theologian, Catholic priest, author, and exegete. Tábet, who was of Lebanese Venezuelan descent, lived and worked in Rome, Italy. He was a professor of biblical hermeneutics, the study of the principles of interpretation of the Bible, at the Pontifical University of the Holy Cross in Rome.

Tabet died from COVID-19 during the COVID-19 pandemic in Rome, Italy, on 7 April 2020, at the age of 78.

== Selected books authored ==
- Tábet, Miguel Ángel (2019). Introducción general a la Biblia (in Spanish). Madrid: Palabra. ISBN 9788498404418.
- Tábet, Miguel Ángel (2019). Introducción al Antiguo Testamento. I: Pentateuco y libros históricos (in Spanish). Madrid: Palabra. ISBN 9788498404425.
- Tábet, Miguel Ángel; Benito Marconcini (2018). Introducción al Antiguo Testamento. II: Libros proféticos (in Spanish). Madrid: Palabra. ISBN 9788498404432.
- Tábet, Miguel Ángel (2016). Introducción al Antiguo Testamento. III: Libros poéticos y sapienciales (in Spanish). Madrid: Palabra. ISBN 9788498404449.
- Tábet, Michelangelo (1999). La Sacra Scrittura anima della teologia (in Italian). Città del Vaticano: Libreria Editrice Vaticana.
- Tábet, Michelangelo (2000). Tra Antico e Nuovo Testamento. Guida alla letteratura intertestamentaria (in Italian). Cinisello Balsamo: San Paolo.
- Tábet, Michelangelo (2003). Le trattazioni teologiche sulla Bibbia. Un approccio alla storia dell'esegesi (in Italian). Cinisello Balsamo: San Paolo.
- Tábet, Michelangelo (2007). Bibbia e storia della salvezza (in Italian). Roma: Edusc.
