= Emile Wijntuin =

Suriname politician (1924–2020)

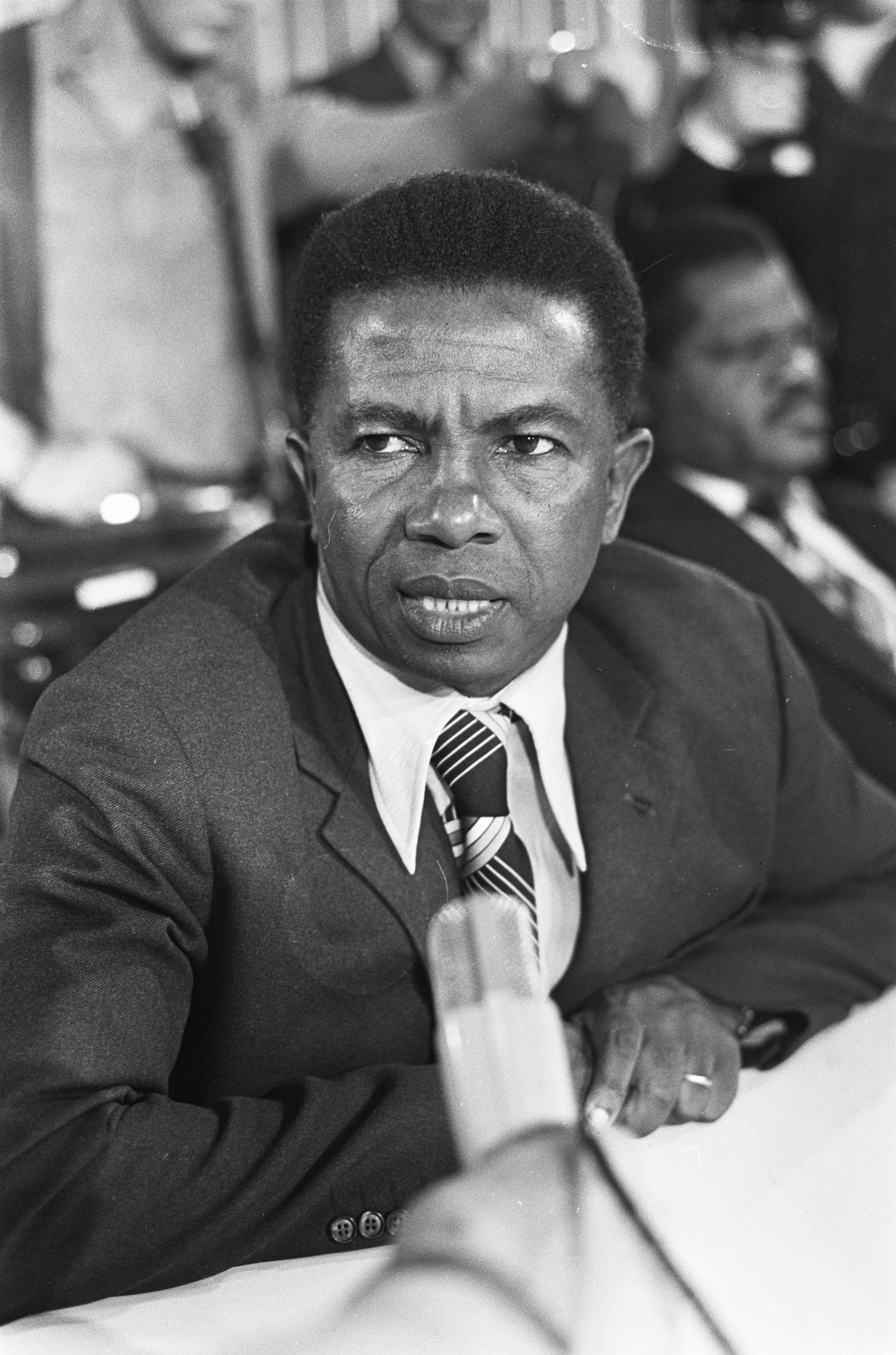
- Emile Wijntuin in 1975

Chairperson of the National Assembly of Suriname
- In office 25 November 1975 – 15 August 1980
- Preceded by: Office established
- Succeeded by: Assembly dismissed until 1986; Ulrich Aron

Chairperson of the Estates of Suriname
- In office 28 December 1973 – 25 November 1975
- Preceded by: Olton van Genderen
- Succeeded by: Office abolished

Personal details
- Born: Emile Linus Alfred Wijntuin; 22 September 1924 Totness, Surinam (now Suriname)
- Died: 7 May 2020 (aged 95) Paramaribo, Suriname
- Party: PSV
- Occupation: Politician

Emile Linus Alfred Wijntuin (22 September 1924 – 7 May 2020) was a Surinamese politician who served as Chairman of the National Assembly of Suriname from 1975 until the aftermath of the 1980 Surinamese coup d'état. Wijntuin was a member of the Progressive Surinamese People's Party (PSV).

== Biography ==
Wijntuin was born in the Coronie District on 22 September 1924 in a family of farmers. At age 12, he was sent to Paramaribo for high school education. In 1943, he became an assistant teacher and received his teaching degree in 1947. During this period, he befriended father Jozef Weidmann and became interested in politics.

In August 1926, Weidmann was one of the founders of PSV, a Christian democratic party. Wijntuin joined the PSV shortly after its foundation. He first ran for office in 1955, but lost to Johan Kraag. From 1958 to 1967 and 1968 to 1980, he was a member of the National Assembly. Wijntuin became chairman of PSV in 1971. He served as the Chairman of the Estates of Suriname from 1973 to 1975.

After the 1980 coup d'etat, Wijntuin was placed under house arrest. In 1982, he left Suriname, and lived in diaspora in the Netherlands. He tried to gather support from the European and South American Christian democrats but found himself increasingly isolated. Wijntuin returned after the restoration of democracy in 1991 but refrained from politics, and started to focus on writing books.

Wijntuin died on 7 May 2020 at the age of 95.

== Other activities ==
In 1962, the Father Weidmann Foundation, was established. The foundation operates a home for stray children, and was chaired by Wijntuin until his death.

In 1994, he published his autobiography Reflekties uit een politiek verleden.

In 1998, Wijntuin wrote Louis Doedel, martelaar voor het Surinaamse volk, about Louis Doedel, a union leader who was involuntary committed in psychiatric hospital Wolfenbüttel on 28 May 1937 by Governor Kielstra. Doedel was forgotten and presumed dead. It wasn't until 1980, that he was released.

== Honours ==
- Suriname: Grand Cordon Honorary Order of the Yellow Star
- Netherlands: Officer in the Order of Orange-Nassau (April 1967)
- Netherlands: Knight in the Order of the Netherlands Lion (November 1975)
- Vatican: Pro Ecclesia et Pontifice (October 2020)

Political offices
Preceded by Olton van Genderen	Chairperson of the Estates of Suriname; 1973–1975	Succeeded by Office abolished
Preceded by Office established	Chairperson of the National Assembly of Suriname; 1975–1980	Succeeded by Assembly dismissed until 1986; Ulrich Aron
