= Erwin de Vries =

Surinamese artist (1929–2018)

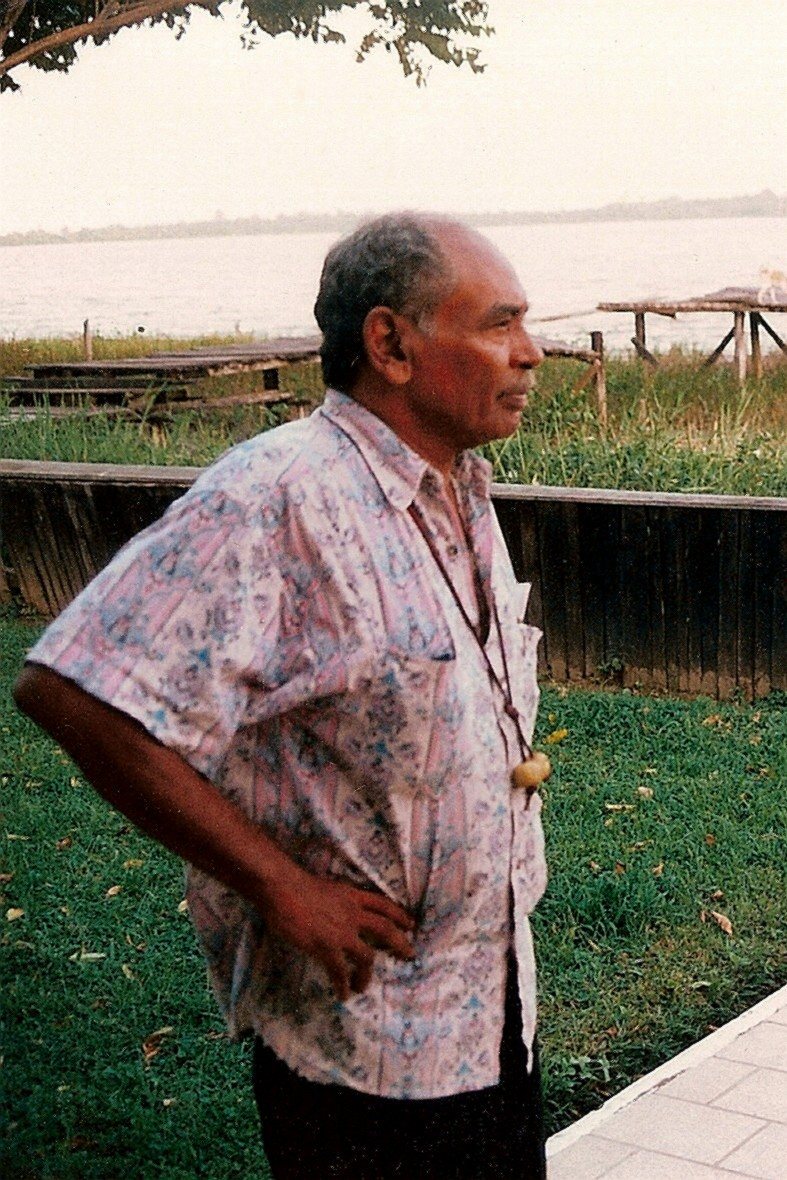
- Erwin de Vries
- Born: 12 December 1926; Paramaribo, Suriname
- Died: 31 January 2018 (aged 88); Paramaribo, Suriname
- Occupations: Painter, sculptor

Erwin de Vries (21 December 1929 – 31 January 2018) was a Surinamese painter and sculptor.

De Vries was born in Paramaribo, and is the half-brother of Henry Lucien de Vries, who served as governor of Suriname from 1965 until 1967. Wim Bos Verschuur, his art teacher, convinced his parents to send him to the Netherlands to further his education. He studied at the Koninklijke Academie van Beeldende Kunsten in The Hague and at the Rijksacademie van Beeldende Kunsten in Amsterdam. De Vries's first exhibition was in 1948 in Paramaribo. His work has since been displayed at the Stedelijk Museum and the Kunsthal in Rotterdam. He is the designer of the Nationaal Monument Slavernijverleden in Amsterdam. De Vries has also exhibited a great deal in Jamaica; there he became acquainted with the work of Barrington Watson, whose erotically charged paintings matched his own in tone.
