= Marinus Bee =

Surinamese politician

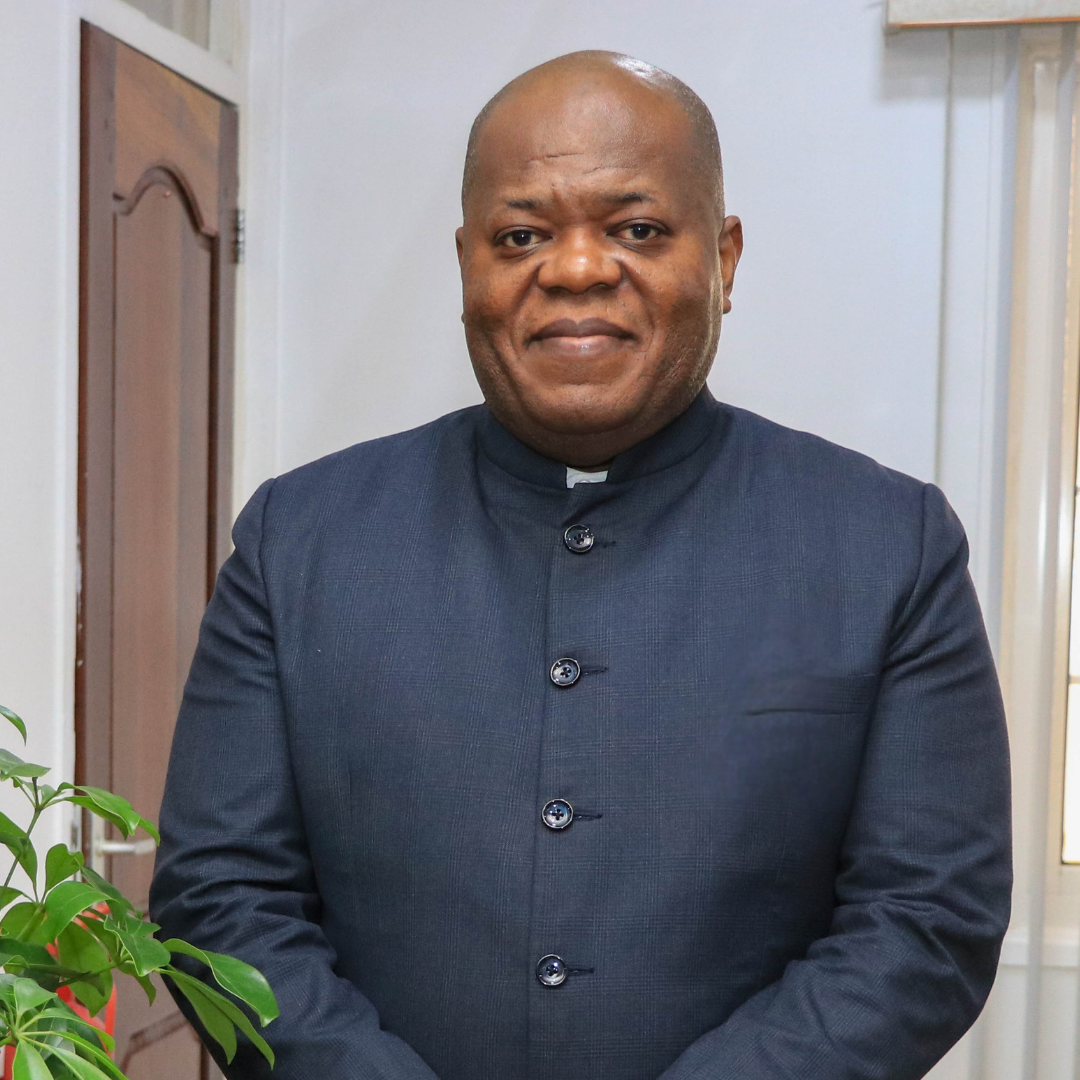
- Bee in 2025

Minister of the Interior
- Incumbent
- Assumed office 16 July 2025
- Preceded by: Delano Landvreugd

Chair of the National Assembly
- In office 14 July 2020 – 27 June 2025
- Preceded by: Ronnie Brunswijk
- Succeeded by: Ashwin Adhin

Member of the National Assembly
- Incumbent
- Assumed office 2010
- Constituency: Marowijne District

Personal details
- Born: Marinus Bee; 3 July 1971 (age 54) Moengo, Suriname
- Political party: General Liberation and Development Party
- Education: Anton de Kom University of Suriname (LLB)

Marinus Bee (born 3 July 1971) is a Surinamese politician who is the Minister of the Interior of Suriname since 2025. He has served in the National Assembly from the Marowijne District as a member of the General Liberation and Development Party since 2010, and was Chair of the assembly from 2020 to 2025. He has been the chair of the association football club S.V. Papatam since 2014.

== Early life and education ==
Marinus Bee was born in Moengo, Suriname, on 3 July 1971. He is descended from Maroons. His grandfather had 30 children and his grandmother lived in French Guiana. Bee was the eldest of four children and grew up in Paramaribo. He graduated from Anton de Kom University of Suriname with a Bachelor of Laws degree. In 2020, he graduated with a Master of Science in business administration.

== Career ==
=== Sports ===
Bee was chair of the Albina Sports Association for ten years. In 2014, he became the chair of S.V. Papatam.

=== Politics ===
Ronnie Brunswijk convinced Bee to join the General Liberation and Development Party (ABOP) in 1999, and became coordinator of the party in Marowijne. He was an unsuccessful candidate in the 2000 election. In the 2010 election he was elected to the National Assembly.

Brunswijk, chair of the National Assembly, was elected Vice President of Suriname and Bee was elected to succeed him as chair on 15 July 2020. In 2025, he stated that he was interested in stepping down as chair and having Ashwin Adhin succeed him. Bee was appointed as Minister of the Interior by President Jennifer Geerlings-Simons on 16 July 2025.

== Political positions ==
Bee is opposed to the United States embargo against Cuba. He called for the passage of legislation to recognize the collective ownership of land by indigenous peoples.

== Works cited ==
=== News ===
- "Bee nieuwe voorzitter Papatam". Star Nieuws. 20 August 2014. Archived from the original on 24 June 2025.
- "Dikan: "We moeten nu werk van maken om de traditionele rechten te erkennen"". Suriname Herald. 21 June 2025. Archived from the original on 24 June 2025.
- "Marinus Bee draagt voortaan MBA-titel". Dagblad Suriname. 7 July 2020. Archived from the original on 24 June 2025.
- "Marinus Bee: "Ik ben ready om de baton over te dragen"". Suriname Herald. 9 June 2025. Archived from the original on 24 June 2025.
- "Marinus Bee: "Niets komt voor zijn tijd, strijd leveren is essentieel"". Dagblad Suriname. 15 April 2025. Archived from the original on 24 June 2025.
- "Marinus Bee now DNA chairman". Dagblad Suriname. 14 July 2020. Archived from the original on 24 June 2025.
- Agodeba, Aidy (12 December 2017). "Marinus Bee: 'Men kan niet komen aan de leiderschapskwaliteiten van Brunswijk' - Parbode Sneak Peek". Parbode. Archived from the original on 8 June 2019.
- González, Isabel (29 May 2024). "Presidente de la Asamblea Nacional de Surinam inicia visita oficial a Cuba". Radio Rebelde. Archived from the original on 24 June 2025.

=== Web ===
- "Ministers en onderministers geïnstalleerd". Suriname. 2025. Archived from the original on 15 November 2025.
- "Suriname". Inter-Parliamentary Union. Archived from the original on 24 June 2025.
