= Ashwin Adhin =

Surinamese politician

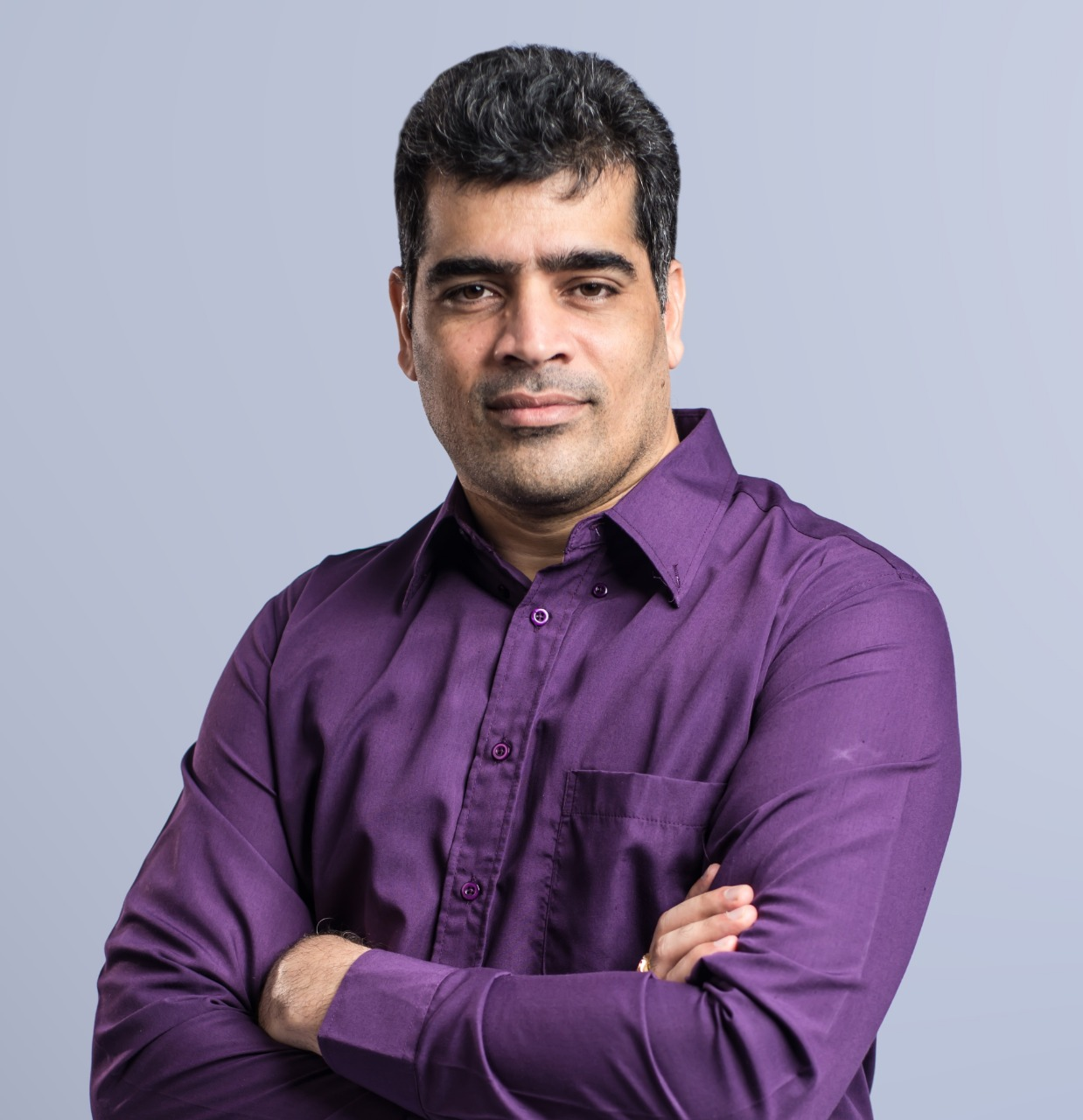
- Adhin in 2020

Chair of the National Assembly
- Incumbent
- Assumed office 28 June 2025
- Preceded by: Marinus Bee

Member of the National Assembly
- Incumbent
- Assumed office 2015
- Constituency: Paramaribo District

7th Vice President of Suriname
- In office 12 August 2015 – 16 July 2020
- President: Dési Bouterse
- Preceded by: Robert Ameerali
- Succeeded by: Ronnie Brunswijk

Personal details
- Born: 10 June 1980 (age 46) Paramaribo, Suriname
- Party: National Democratic Party

Michael Ashwin Satyandre Adhin (born 10 June 1980) is a Surinamese politician and educator of Indian origin who served as the Vice President of Suriname between 2015 and 2020. He is a member of the National Democratic Party. At the age of 35, he became the youngest vice president in the history of Suriname to lead the Council of Ministers.

In July 2013, Adhin became the Minister of Education in the cabinet of President Dési Bouterse, replacing Shirley Sitaldin. After the 2015 Surinamese general election, in which Adhin was elected to the National Assembly for the electoral district of Paramaribo, he was inaugurated as vice president on 12 August 2015, and served until 16 July 2020. He was succeeded by Ronnie Brunswijk.

== Early life and career ==
=== Education and life ===
Adhin obtained a BSc degree in Electrical Engineering (Information Technology) from the Anton de Kom University of Suriname (AdeKUS) in 2001, and subsequently a Dutch Engineers's degree (Ir.) in Electrical Engineering (Telecommunications) from the Delft University of Technology in 2004.

Before embarking on a political career, he served as an educator at the Anton de Kom University of Suriname.

Adhin is a Hindu of Indian descent.

=== Chair Cultural Union Suriname (CUS) ===
In May 2011 Adhin was appointed the new chairman of the Cultural Union Suriname and remained onboard until February 2014. Adhin has been involved in social and cultural organisations for 13 years. His stated areas of interest include culture, development, cultural awareness, heritage, and collective participation in social and cultural activities. Adhin was involved in the organisation of activities marking the 140th anniversary of Indian immigration to Suriname. In July 2013, President Dési Bouterse appointed him Minister of Education and Community Development.

Adhin has also been an active member of the Suriname chapter of the Vishva Hindu Parishad, a Hindu nationalist organisation that has been implicated in violence against Muslims in India, and the foundation Mata Gauri.

== Minister of Education and Community Development ==
From 2013 to 2015 Adhin served as Minister of Education and Community Development. He announced a total restructuring of the Ministry as part of reforms.

=== Suriname National Training Authority ===
In August 2013 Adhin launched the Technical Vocational Education and Training (TVET) method of education in Suriname. A taskforce was installed on November 1, 2013, to work towards the establishment of a National Training Authority making use of an existing Caricom strategy. The proposed national authority was intended to address the relationship between the education system and private-sector labour market requirements. Its proposed responsibilities included the certification of professions and quality assurance of courses offered within Suriname's education system.

== Vice President of Suriname ==
=== Foreign policy ===
==== Relations with India ====
On January 9, 2017, Vice President Adhin met with the Prime Minister of India, Narendra Modi, in Bengaluru, India, where they discussed strengthening the economic and technological bilateral cooperation between both states. Adhin emphasized Suriname's potential in the areas of agriculture, animal husbandry, palm oil, wood processing, besides those in the extractive industries (gold, crude oil and bauxite). He wished to establish a chair on Ayurveda, a pseudoscientific practice originating in India and whose preparations contain toxic levels of lead and mercury, at the University of Suriname and National Institute for Natural and Holistic Therapies in collaboration with India. Adhin proposed the establishment of medicinal plant plantations, research laboratories and manufacturing facilities for Ayurveda products, with the stated aim of supplying the Surinamese market and expanding distribution to other countries in Latin America and the Caribbean.

As an individual of Indian heritage, Adhin was invited to India as keynote speaker at the Youth Privasi Bharatiya Divas Convention held on January 7, 2016, which was part of the annual Privasi Bharatiya Divas (PBD) Convention, a global platform for the Indian diaspora held from 8–9 January 2017 in Bengaluru, the capital of the state of Karnataka.

== 2020 Elections ==
Adhin has been elected to the National Assembly in 2020 according to the official results. Adhin was not a candidate for the 2020 Vice Presidency, and no other candidates other than Brunswijk had been nominated as per 8 July 2020, 15:00 (UTC−3). Therefore Ronnie Brunswijk was elected as his successor on 13 July in an uncontested election. Adhin's term as vice president ended on 16 July 2020.

== See also ==
- Government of Suriname

Political offices
Preceded by Robert Ameerali	Vice President of Suriname; 2015–2020	Succeeded by Ronnie Brunswijk
