= List of chairmen of the National Assembly of Suriname =

Chairman of the National Assembly of Suriname
- Voorzitter van De Nationale Assemblée
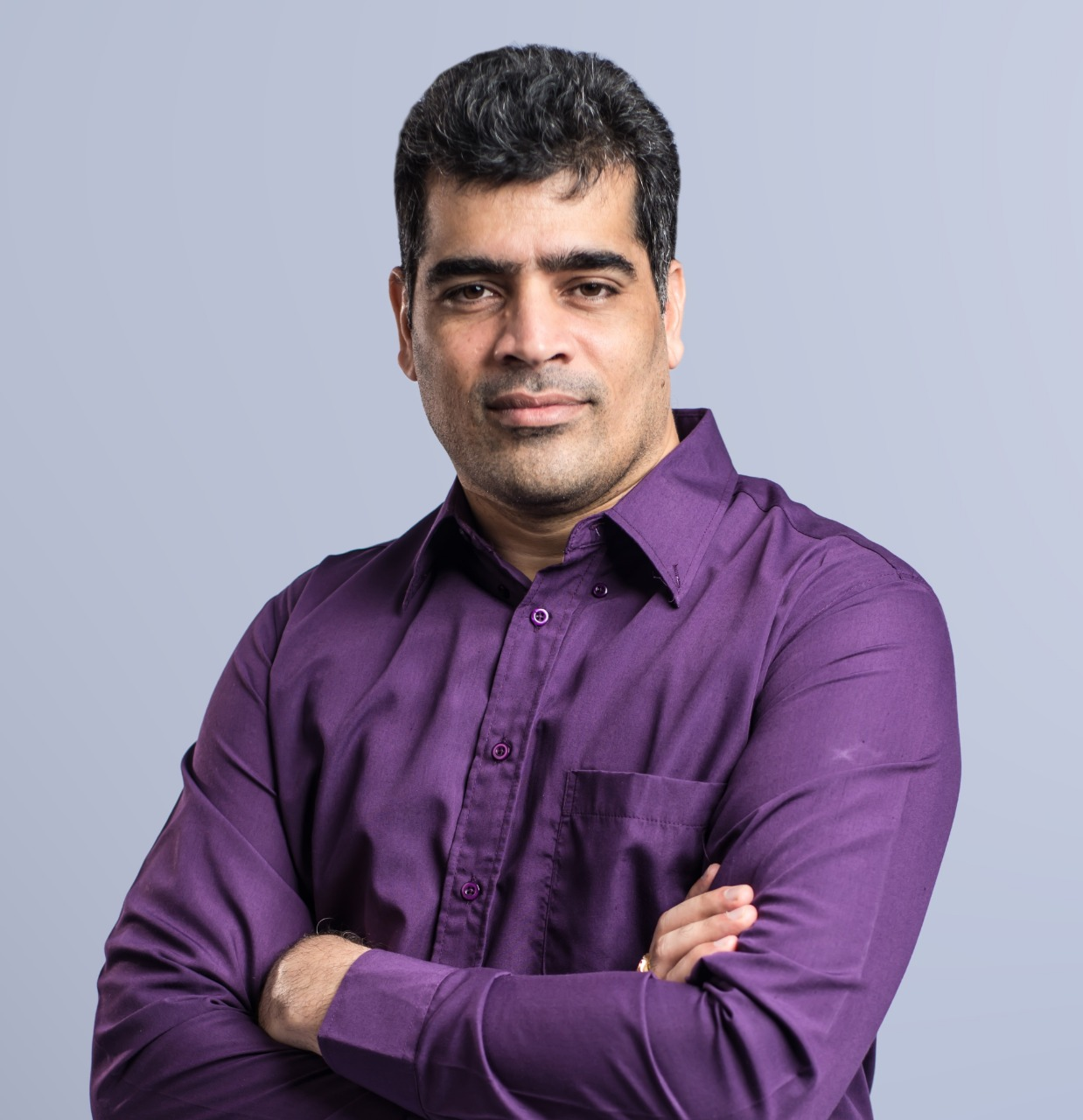
- Incumbent; Ashwin Adhin since 28 June 2025
- Seat: Paramaribo
- Term length: Five years, renewable
- Inaugural holder: Emile Wijntuin
- Formation: 25 November 1975; 50 years ago

The chairman of the National Assembly of Suriname (Dutch: Voorzitter van De Nationale Assemblée) is the presiding officer of the National Assembly of Suriname.

== List of chairmen ==
The following is a complete list of office-holders since independence in 1975:

Political parties

Progressive Surinamese People's Party (PSV)
February 25th Movement (VFB) → National Democratic Party (NDP)
Progressive Reform Party (VHP)
Basic Party for Renewal and Democracy (BVD)
Pertjajah Luhur (PL)
General Liberation and Development Party (ABOP)

No.	Portrait	Name (Birth–Death)	Term of office			Political party	Ref.
No.	Portrait	Name (Birth–Death)	Took office	Left office	Time in office	Political party	Ref.
1		Emile Wijntuin (1924–2020)	25 November 1975	15 August 1980 (Note: Dismissed after the Sergeants' Coup.)	4 years, 264 days	PSV	
Assembly dismissed (15 August 1980 – 15 January 1986)
2		Ulrich Aron (1944/45–2025)	15 January 1986	10 December 1987	1 year, 329 days	VFB	
3		Jagernath Lachmon (1916–2001)	14 December 1987	9 October 1996	8 years, 300 days	VHP	
4		Marijke Djwalapersad (1951–2025)	10 October 1996	23 July 2000	3 years, 287 days	BVD	
(3)		Jagernath Lachmon (1916–2001)	24 July 2000	19 October 2001	1 year, 87 days	VHP	
5		Ram Sardjoe (born 1935)	6 November 2001	30 June 2005	3 years, 236 days	VHP	
6		Paul Somohardjo (born 1943)	30 June 2005	30 June 2010	5 years	PL	
7		Jennifer Geerlings-Simons (born 1953)	30 June 2010	28 June 2020	9 years, 364 days	NDP	
8		Ronnie Brunswijk (born 1961)	29 June 2020	14 July 2020	15 days	ABOP	
9		Marinus Bee (born 1971)	14 July 2020	27 June 2025	4 years, 348 days	ABOP	
10		Ashwin Adhin (born 1980)	28 June 2025	Incumbent	1 year, 103 days (as of 9 October 2026)	NDP	

== See also ==
- List of chairmen of the Estates of Suriname
