= COVID-19 pandemic in Suriname =

Ongoing COVID-19 viral pandemic in Suriname

- Disease: COVID-19
- Pathogen: SARS-CoV-2
- Location: Suriname
- First outbreak: Netherlands
- Index case: Paramaribo
- Arrival date: 13 March 2020 (6 years, 5 months, 1 week and 2 days)
- Confirmed cases: 82,525
- Recovered: 81,580 (updated 23 July 2023)
- Deaths: 1,406

Government website
- https://covid-19.sr

The COVID-19 pandemic in Suriname was caused by Severe acute respiratory syndrome coronavirus 2 (SARS-CoV-2). The virus was confirmed to have reached Suriname on 13 March 2020. The case was a person who travelled from the Netherlands the previous week. On 3 April 2020, one person died. On 3 May 2020, all nine cases had recovered. On 18 May, an eleventh case was identified.

== Background ==
On 12 January 2020, the World Health Organization (WHO) confirmed that a novel coronavirus was the cause of a respiratory illness in a cluster of people in Wuhan City, Hubei Province, China, which was reported to the WHO on 31 December 2019.

The case fatality rate for COVID-19 has been much lower than SARS of 2003, but the transmission has been significantly greater, with a significant total death toll.

== Timeline ==
Cases

Deaths

=== March 2020 ===
On 2 March, the backtrack route between Guyana and Suriname was closed. Originally the closure was for one week, but was extended until further notice.

Suriname was considered a country at risk due to a 'weak' health system. On 3 March, Jerry Slijngard of the National Coordination Centre for Emergency Management (NCCR) was not sure whether the country could handle a massive outbreak: "If we are talking about two or three people, we can handle it, but a hundred or a thousand is a different ball game."

On 13 March, Suriname's Vice President Ashwin Adhin announced the first confirmed case of coronavirus in the country: an individual who arrived from the Netherlands multiple days prior to testing positive. As a result, the country announced that its borders and all airports would shut down at midnight on 14 March.

On 16 March, all schools were closed to prevent further spread.

On 24 March, Antoine Joly, the French ambassador to Suriname, became the eight case. Because he was in reasonable condition, he was transported to Cayenne in French Guiana on 29 March, where he quarantined.

On 28 March, a partial lock-down was announced with a curfew between 20:00 and 06:00 by President Dési Bouterse.
The measures were being supported by the maroon and indigenous people. Bono Velanti, granman (paramount chief) of the Ndyuka, instructed his people to remain at home. Albert Aboikoni, granman of the Saramaka, sent an audio message to the chieftains to comply with the measures. Ipomadi Pelenapïn, granman of the Wayana announced the closure of their villages. The association of indigenous village chiefs in Suriname had announced their own COVID-19 measures.

=== April 2020 ===
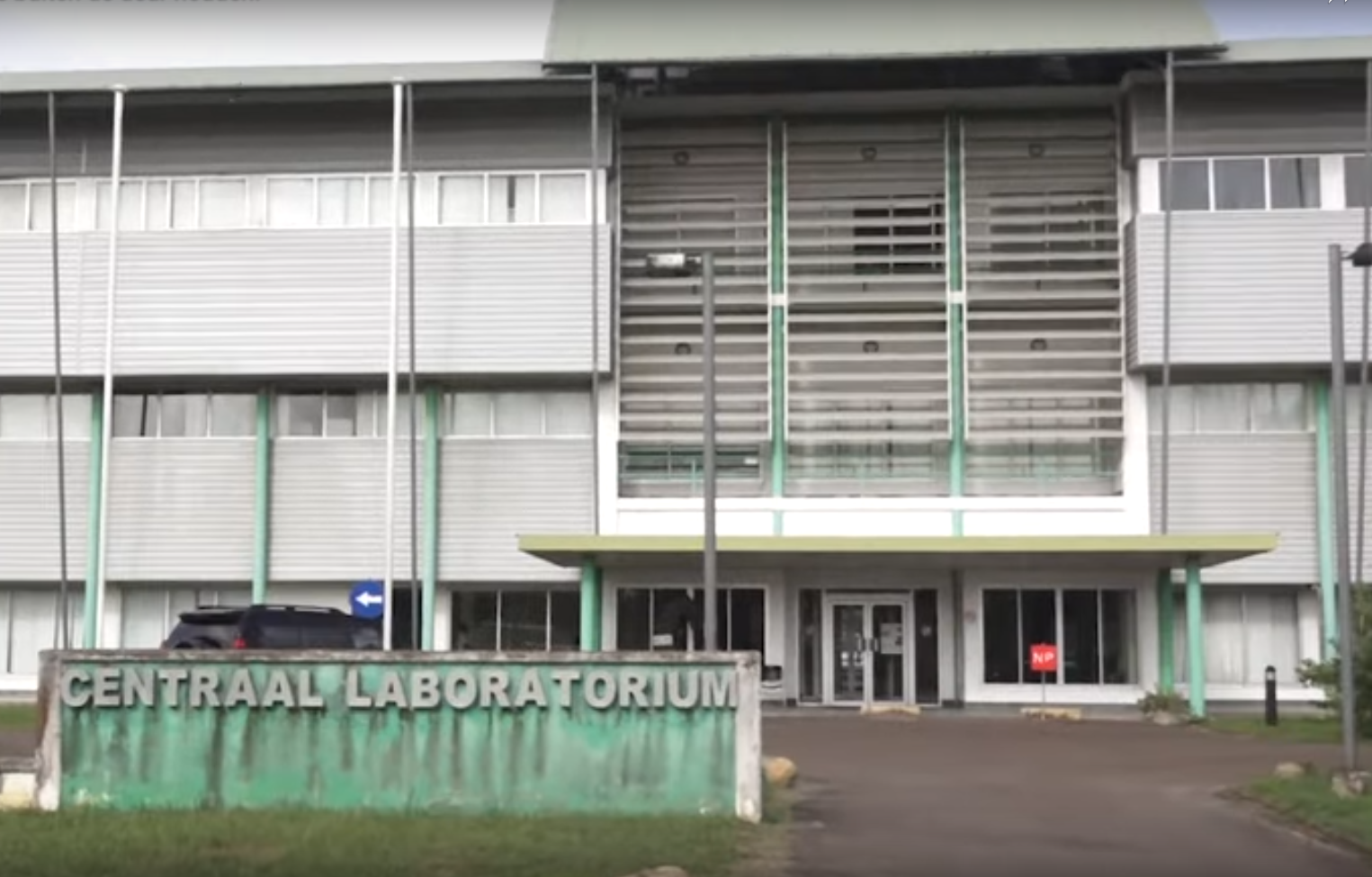
Central Laboratory, Paramaribo

On 2 April, three patients were released from the hospital after testing negative twice for the virus. They would remain under house quarantine for another week. 274 people, including all healthcare workers had been tested.
Minister Stephan Tsang of Trade, Industry and Tourism warned of difficult times ahead. The country was already in a financial crisis made worse by a CCC+ (junk) rating by Standard & Poor's.

On 3 April, Suriname announced the first COVID-19 related death. The deceased was the husband of the first case.
There were now 10 confirmed cases. The first case spread to five people, with two cases arriving from Aruba. One outgoing patient infected two people.
The hospitals shared 30 ventilators between them, and on 16 March the staff of the St. Vincentius Ziekenhuis complained about a lack of supplies to adequately deal with COVID-19 patients.

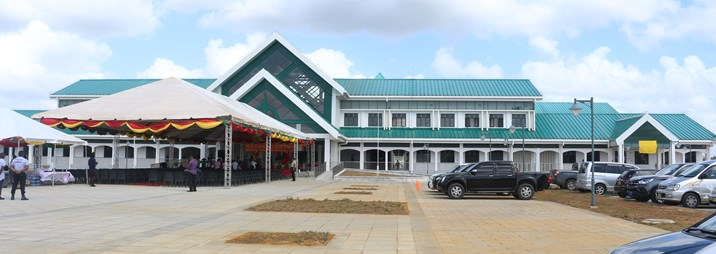
Regional Hospital Wanica

On 6 April, a specialized COVID-19 ward was opened in the Regional Hospital Wanica in Lelydorp. Wanica was Suriname's newest hospital facility which had opened earlier in the year on 7 February. Wanica had already looked after ambassador Antoine Joly. The hospital would also be used for quarantines.
The International Academy of Suriname has announced that the examinations would continue online, and that students progress would be tracked through Distance education.

On 7 April, Ambassador Joly recovered from COVID-19. The three patients released on April 2 were declared officially to have been clear of the virus .
André Misiekaba, minister of Social Affairs and Housing, said that Suriname was not in a condition yet for emergency funds, but that food packages had been distributed to a hundred villages in the interior.

On 8 April, the Law Exceptional Condition COVID-19 (State of Emergency) was approved by the National Assembly. The State of Emergency would go into effect for three months unless the National Assembly one-off extends the duration for another three months.
Alibaba donated two ventilators, 30,000 masks and 2,000 tests to the Ministry of Health.

On 9 April, the European Union announced a grant of €8M (US$8.6M), which would be implemented by the Caribbean Public Health Agency, for the fight against the coronavirus. Suriname is one of the 24 members of the CARPHA.

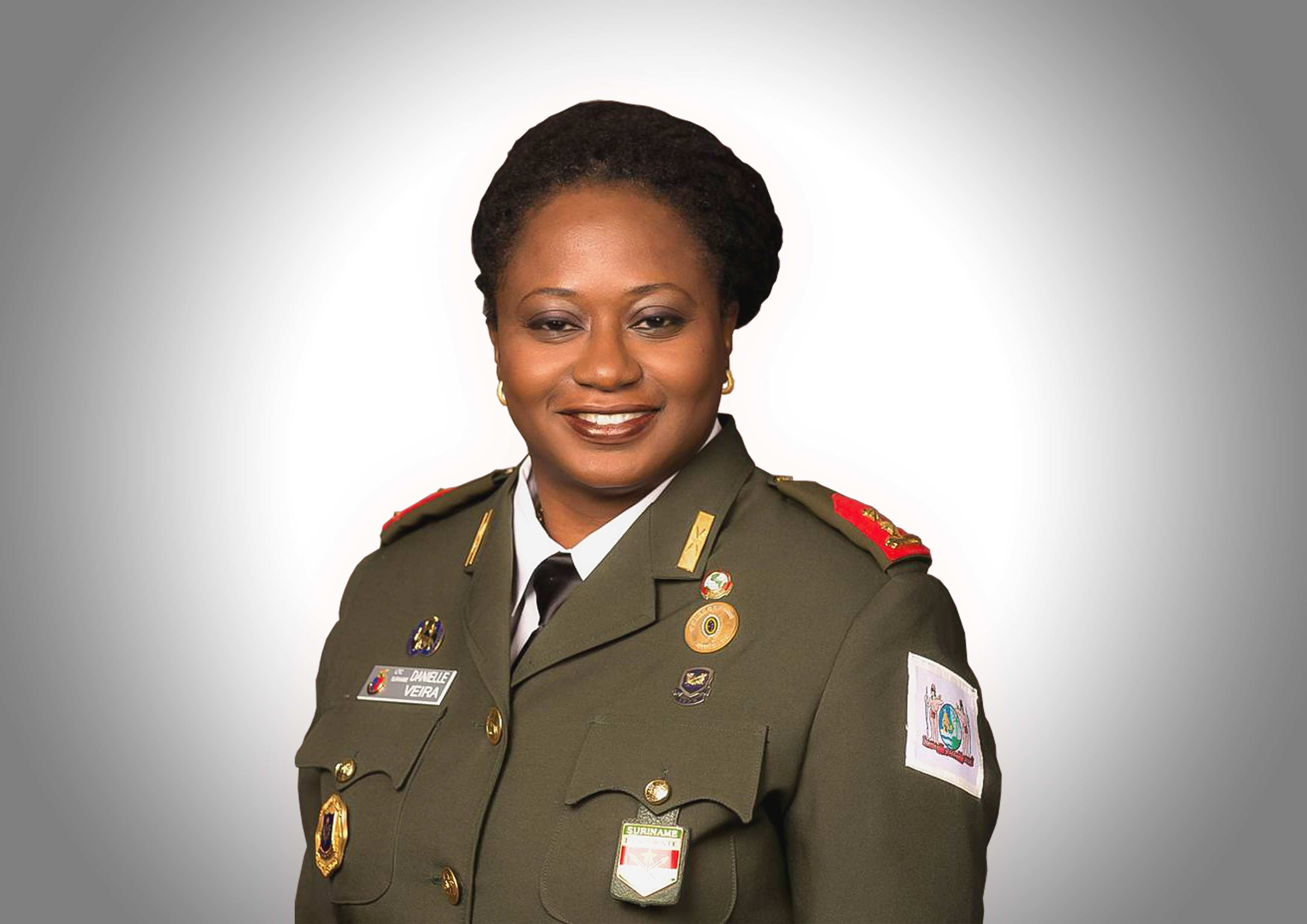
Danielle Veira

On 11 April, President Bouterse came under scrutiny by attending a large NDP gathering in Flora and not observing social distancing despite addressing the nation on 10 April and urging the population to observe social distancing. On 13 April, Bouterse apologized for his behavior.

On 13 April, two more patients were declared recovered.
The population was still confronted with widespread price gouging. The increased prices were not just related to the COVID-19 pandemic, but were also made worse by the Currency Law which passed on 24 March making transactions in foreign currencies illegal.

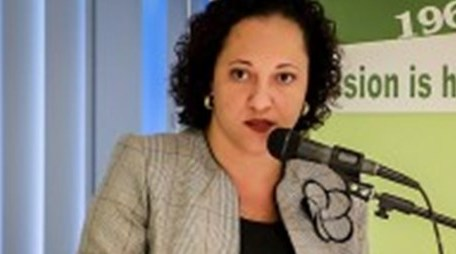
Cleopatra Jessurun

On 16 April, education lessons would start on broadcasting on television, because it had been unclear when regular classes could resume.
Minouche Bromet of the Ministry of Health said that wearing a mask if you were healthy would not be necessary, because there was no community spread in Suriname.

On 17 April, the repatriates of the 2 April flight from Miami, were released from quarantine after an exit screening. 41 people were placed in quarantine. On 20 April, Jerry Slijngard said that the group still in quarantine tried to illegally cross the border.

On 20 April, Cleopatra Jessurun, Director of the Ministry of Health, announced that the last three patients were in a healthy condition and would be released after they test negative twice for the virus.

On 23 April, Medische Zending closed their outpatient clinic in Gonini Krikimofo. One of their employees had been in contact with one of the nine cases diagnosed on 22 April in Grand-Santi, French Guiana. Other outpatient clinics in East Sipaliwini were only open for emergencies and pre-natal care, otherwise they would only be reachable by telephone. Medische Zending announced on 25 April that they were sending an epidemiological team to Gonini Krikimofo who would screen and test the entire community. The French health authorities would do the same on the other side of the river. The clinic in Gonini Krikimofo reopened on 30 April. The two employees were reported to be healthy and the clinic was disinfected. The population of Tjaboe Tabiki was screened and tested negative. On 13 May, it was reported by the French health service that there had been no new cases in Grand-Santi for two weeks.

On 29 April, another person was discharged from the hospital, after testing negative twice for the virus. The person would be officially declared recovered after still testing negative for another week. One individual was still reported to be at 's Lands Hospitaal.

=== May 2020 ===
On 2 May, the Star Nieuws reported that the last person was released from 's Lands Hospital after testing negative twice. The case who was diagnosed on 13 March had not yet officially been declared well. The total number of people tested on 1 May was 532.

On 3 May, Suriname officially became virus free. The Crisis Management Team reminded everybody that it was important to remain on alert, and that the border situation is would still be a source of concern.

To guarantee the absence of COVID-19, samples were passed on the Pasteur Institute in Cayenne. Mirdad Kazanji, Director of the Pasteur Institute explained that both laboratories have been sending negative and positive samples to each other as a quality control.

On 5 May, the World Bank provided US$412,000 to Suriname to purchase essential medical supplies for the country's emergency response to the COVID-19 pandemic.

On 9 May, President Bouterse announced an easing of the curfew from 23:00 to 05:00 starting 10 May. The lock-down on the Marowijne, Lawa and Tapanahony rivers would be eased from 18:00 to 06:00. An economic support program would be put in place and resumption of schools was considered for 1 June.

On 11 May, the government announced an economic support program. SRD 400 million had been reserved to aid the people and businesses.
Huawei donated 1,000 tablets for e-learning.

On 13 May, the Ministry of Finance announced a tax and work support program.

On 18 May, an eleventh case was identified. It concerned an illegal immigrant who was detained together nine others near Nieuw Amsterdam.

On 21 May, President Bouterse announced that the partial lockdown will be suspended on 24 and 25 May, due to the upcoming elections, but reinstated on the 26 May. Air travel inside Suriname would be allowed as of 22 May.

On 25 May, a general election was held despite the pandemic.

On 28 May, a new case had been discovered. The person had returned from French Guiana to Albina.

On 30 May, two more cases were discovered. In both cases the original is still unknown. An epidemiological team was sent to Marowijne District to investigate. As a precautionary measure, internal flights were suspended, and the bridge at Stolkertsijver was closed. District commissioner Yvonne Pinas of Boven Saramacca was one of the people who tested positive.

On 31 May, the village of Klaaskreek isolated itself at 18:00. Klaaskreek was the town where Yvonne Pinas had voted. The number of active cases had increased to 23. The count of 24 was erroneous and had been corrected.

=== June 2020 ===
On 1 June, President Bouterse announced that the partial lock down would be back in effect from 18:00 to 06:00, and that all easements of restrictions would be cancelled.

On 3 June, Vice President Ashwin Adhin announced a full lockdown starting 4 June 18:00 until 12 June 06:00. People were asked Stay-at-home by the government. Supermarkets, bakeries, gas stations, etc. would remain open between 08:00 and 17:00.

On 5 June, Nieuw Jacobkondre and surrounding villages were placed in quarantine. Other villages in the interior were screened as well.

On 6 June, Danielle Veira announced a total lockdown from Monday 8 June until 21 June, because the soft lock down was not being respected.

On 8 June, people were only allowed outside based on their surname. A second death was reported of a woman who died at Regional Hospital Wanica. President Bouterse had announced that the deceased was named Haidy Pinas. Bouterse also announced the suspension of the country's vehicle registration system.

On 11 June, it was announced that Jerry Slijngard, part of the COVID-19 management team and Director National Coordination Centre for Emergency, was diagnosed COVID-19 positive. Of the 24 new infections, 11 were in the Brazilian border village of Sipaliwini Savanna.

On 12 June, a third person died of COVID-19. He died at home, and because his symptoms were consistent with COVID-19, he received a postmortem test.

On 14 June, the Government of Suriname has asked the Dutch Government for assistance. Specific details were sparse but it would have Surinamers voor Surinamers (SU4SU) included in the efforts. SU4SU has started a fund raising program both in Suriname and the Netherlands that weekend.

On 19 June, a mother who was diagnosed COVID-19 positive gave birth to a healthy son.

On 20 June, it was announced that the lockdown would be softened from 21:00 until 05:00, starting on 21 June.

On 27 June there was an increase of 76 cases. Most of the cases were the result of testing in the South-east of Suriname by Medische Zending, which resulted in further identifications of infections in most villages.

=== July 2020 ===
On 1 July, Paul Somohardjo, chairman of Pertjajah Luhur and coalition partner of the new government, had been diagnosed COVID-19 positive. He was taken to the Academic Hospital Paramaribo on the evening of 30 June. Chan Santokhi, Gregory Rusland and Ronnie Brunswijk went into quarantine, because they had been in long meetings with Somohardjo about the new government. It is likely that more politicians went into quarantine. Albert Ramdin told De Ware Tijd that the transition of government and election of a new President and Vice President would continue even though some arrangements and procedures had to be altered. Both Rusland and Brunswijk had tested COVID-19 positive, however Santokhi tested negative.

On 2 July, the National Assembly meeting of 2 July was rescheduled to 6 July. President Bouterse had tested negative. All members of the National Assembly were tested as well, as a precautionary measure.

On 3 July, Dew Sharman, Vice Chairman of the National Assembly, announced that the Presidential Elections would be postponed to 10 July at the earliest. The Presidential Elections were held on 13 July.
30 medical professionals from the Netherlands volunteered to assist in Suriname. The first seven had left for the country on 3 July. All are experienced with handling COVID-19.

On 5 July, it was reported that 83 employees of Rosebel Gold Mines had contracted COVID-19. The employees have been locked down in the mines for three weeks now, and it is unclear when their quarantine would have ended.

As of 6 July, educational institutions would be permitted to reopen in the upcoming examination year. Schools in East Suriname would remain closed and villages remaining under lockdown due to area being a COVID-19 hotspot cluster. It concerns the area from Stoelmanseiland up to Antonio do Brinco.

On 17 July, the new Minister of Health Amar Ramadhin announced a new policy, with changes on the publishing of data, where it would be once a day at 20:00 (UTC−3).

On 20 July, a quarantine and isolation facility was to be set up at Stoelmanseiland. Between 11 July and 15 July, a medical team had been testing in the interior between Stoelmanseiland and Diitabiki, and 23 out of 32 people tested positive for symptoms.

On 25 July, additional measure were announced by President Chan Santokhi, because the increase of cases:

- Wearing of face masks outdoors is mandatory.
- Keeping at least a distance of 1.5 meters for others.
- Regularly disinfecting of your hands.

=== August 2020 ===
On 11 August, Santokhi announced a series of new measures, requiring the use of face masks, reducing operating practices of restaurants, and prohibiting groups of 5 or people from gathering except for work, education, religious gatherings and funerals. The national curfew would be from 21:00 to 5:00 everyday until 23 August.

On 19 August, Health Minister Ramadhin told reporters that the mortuary Wanica Regional Hospital had already reached its maximum capacity, and was critical of persons who continued to ignore measures put in place to curb the spread.

=== October 2020 ===
On 1 October, the new school year starts with preventive measures in place.

== Preventive measures ==
A soft lock down has been announced from 4 June 18:00 until 12 June 06:00. It changed to total lockdown from 8 June to 21 June. People will only be allowed on the street on certain days based on their surname.

From Sunday 21 June onwards, the following measures are in effect in Suriname:

- Lock down from 21:00 until 05:00. As of 6 July, 22:00 to 05:00. From 26 July until 10 August, a lock down from 21:00 until 05:00.
- Hotels, casinos, churches, sport centres etc. remain closed. Other businesses can reopen. As of 6 July, all can reopen with social distancing measures. From 26 July until 10 August, closed again.
- Restaurants are take-away only.
- Internal flights are possible under restrictions.
- Limited visitation of the elderly is possible.
- State of Emergency. The government has extended powers like taking vacant buildings and offices for the use of quarantine.
- Public transport has been halted. As of 6 July, public transport can resume according to the health protocol.
- Ban on gathering of groups with more than 5 people.
- Schools will reopen on 6 July for students in their examination year.
- From 26 July until 10 August, wearing of masks in mandatory.

East-Suriname is excepted and will remain under lock down. It concerns the area from Stoelmanseiland up to Antonio do Brinco.

=== Old measures ===
The following measures were in effect in Suriname prior to 4 June:

- All borders, airports and ports are closed for passengers. Air travel within Suriname will be allowed as of 22 May. Air travel inside Suriname has been suspended as of 31 May.
- All schools are closed.
- Ban on gathering of groups with more than 10 people. From 10 May onward, groups with more than 50 people will be prohibited. From 2 June onward, groups with more than 5 people will be prohibited.
- Curfew between 20:00 and 06:00. From 10 May, the curfew will be 23:00 to 05:00, but 18:00 to 06:00 on the Marowijne, Lawa and Tapanahony rivers. From 2 June, curfew between 18:00 and 06:00.
- Home quarantine is no longer allowed for new cases.
- State of Emergency. The government has extended powers like taking vacant buildings and offices for the use of quarantine.
- Public transport has been halted.
- Businesses including hotels and sports schools can reopen as of 15 May providing they abide to the social distancing regulations. As of 22 May, markets and casinos can reopen. Restrictions have been reinstated as of 2 June.

== Repatriation ==
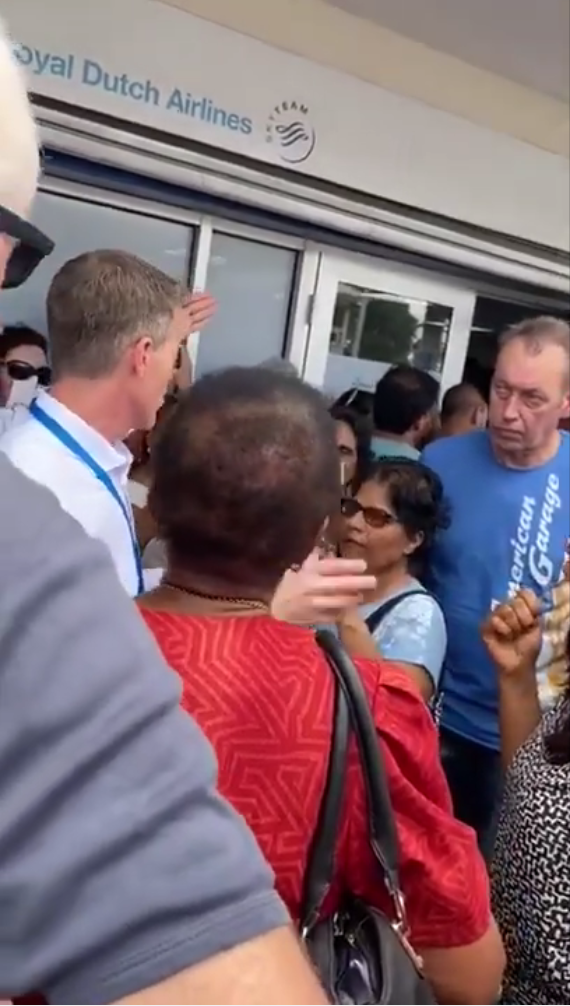
16 March at the offices of Air France–KLM

The closure of the borders initially caused concern with both foreigners inside Suriname and Surinamese people aboard. Suriname is a former colony of the Netherlands and shares Dutch as the official language, therefore there are always a large amount people going back and forth between the countries.

Initially some repatriation flights were allowed including flights to the Netherlands, but the level of infections aboard and the identification of two cases on a flight from Aruba resulted in concern.

On 3 April, a group of Dutch people in Suriname were scheduled to be repatriated, but there was an issue with the plane which resulted it in arriving a day late. They have been housed in two hotels where they had been quarantined, because Dutch citizens from Guyana were on the same flight. A second plane had repatriated them on 5 April.

On 7 April, Danielle Veira announced that the repatriation of Surinamese people abroad was postponed for the time being. It was also announced that home quarantine would not be allowed anymore, because of some people kept leaving their house despite being quarantined.

As of 9 April, there were 893 stranded people of which 603 were in the Netherlands and 88 in the United States. A total 513 people from abroad in Suriname had been repatriated.

On 14 April, Danielle Veira contacted Irene Lalji, a lawyer representing a hundred stranded citizens in the Netherlands, to inform her that they were preparing to schedule a first flight for repatriation that week, and increasing the capacity for quarantine.

On 15 April, a group of over Trinidadian 40 people within the country were reported to be in a "desperate" situation. 33 people of the group had been hired by Staatsolie, the national oil company. Despite multiple contacts to the Consulate and CARICOM, no plans to repatriate them had been made. On 30 April, a chartered a plane was scheduled that was able to return them.
The first repatriation flight from Amsterdam to Paramaribo had been announced on 19 April. On 20 April, the first 200 people were brought home. Veira stressed that they would be quarantined in Hotel Babylon, Royal Torarica, and Eco resort on return. On 21 April, the plane returned Dutch people stranded in Suriname.

On 24 April, Jessurun said that four bodies of recently deceased persons in the Netherlands could not be flown to Suriname. Two of the four had died of COVID-19.
There is a group of Cubans stranded in Suriname without money. Veira has indicated that a repatriation flight is being considered.

On 4 May, the next phase of repatriation was announced: 6 May: Belém, Brazil, 7 May: Guyana, 8 May: the second group of 220 people in the Netherlands. The flight to Belém had been postponed to 7 May to allow for Brazilians stranded in Suriname. 15 May: India.

On 15 May, 11 out of 23 people from India had been repatriated via India. Those still stranded would have to contact the embassy.

As of 15 May, there would be no more repatriation flights for the time being, which has also been due to the fact that there were 576 people in quarantine.

== Borders ==
Suriname is bordered with French Guiana by the Marowijne river. There is no bridge between the two countries and border traffic has to use the ferry between Albina and Saint-Laurent-du-Maroni. On 11 April, Suriname and France announced joint efforts to prevent illegal crossings of the Marowijne, and established a contact point in Albina and Saint-Laurent-du-Maroni. On 13 April, the Prefect of French-Guinea mobilized the army to guard the river for its entire length. On 15 April, John Samuel, chair of the political party De Nieuwe Wind and former consul to French Guinea, had been sent back when he tried to illegally cross the river to visit his family. A total lockdown of the rivers on the eastern border was instituted from 30 April, and concerns the Marowijne, Lawa and Tapanahony river. Essential traffic would be allowed, however people who illegally crossed the rivers would have to quarantine for 14 days. As of 2 May, the use of skalians (gold dredges) on the rivers are forbidden. French Guiana had previously complained about the increase of – often illegal – gold prospectors.

Suriname is bordered with Guyana by the Courantyne river, and border traffic has to use the Canawaima ferry between Nieuw Nickerie and Corriverton, Guyana. A bridge between Apoera and Orealla in Guyana is still being planned. On 21 April, Suriname and Guyana have agreed to allow legitimate trade over the Courantyne river, because the closure had resulted in food and fuel shortage in the Amerindian villages, Orealla and Siparuta. The border will remain closed for people.

Suriname's border with Brazil has been established by the Treaty of Limits and mainly consists of impenetrable rainforest, and can be accessed through maroon and indigenous areas some of which are de jure autonomous like the Ndyuka. The discovery of gold has led to illegal border crossings and the establishment of villages in the border area. The international drugs trade also exploits the backdoor.

== Notable deaths ==
As of 17 April, there had only been one death reported in the Suriname, but there had been several COVID-19 related deaths of notable people abroad who either had a Surinamese nationality or a strong connection to Suriname.

On 30 March, Jorge Sebá, the honorary consul of Suriname for Brazil, died in Rio de Janeiro.

On 3 April, Hans Prade, former ambassador of Suriname to the Netherlands and former President of the Surinamese Court of Auditors, died in Rotterdam.

On 10 April, Bas Mulder, a Dutch Catholic priest known as a media personality and sports promoter, spend most of his life in Suriname, died in Boxmeer, the Netherlands.

On 12 April, Surinamese-Dutch singer and percussionist Kishen Bholasing died in the Academic Medical Center in Amsterdam, the Netherlands aged 35.

On 20 July 2021, Theo Jubitana, Captain of the indigenous village Hollandse Kamp and Chairman of the Association of Indigenous Village Heads Suriname (VIDS) died at the age of 56.

== Crisis management ==
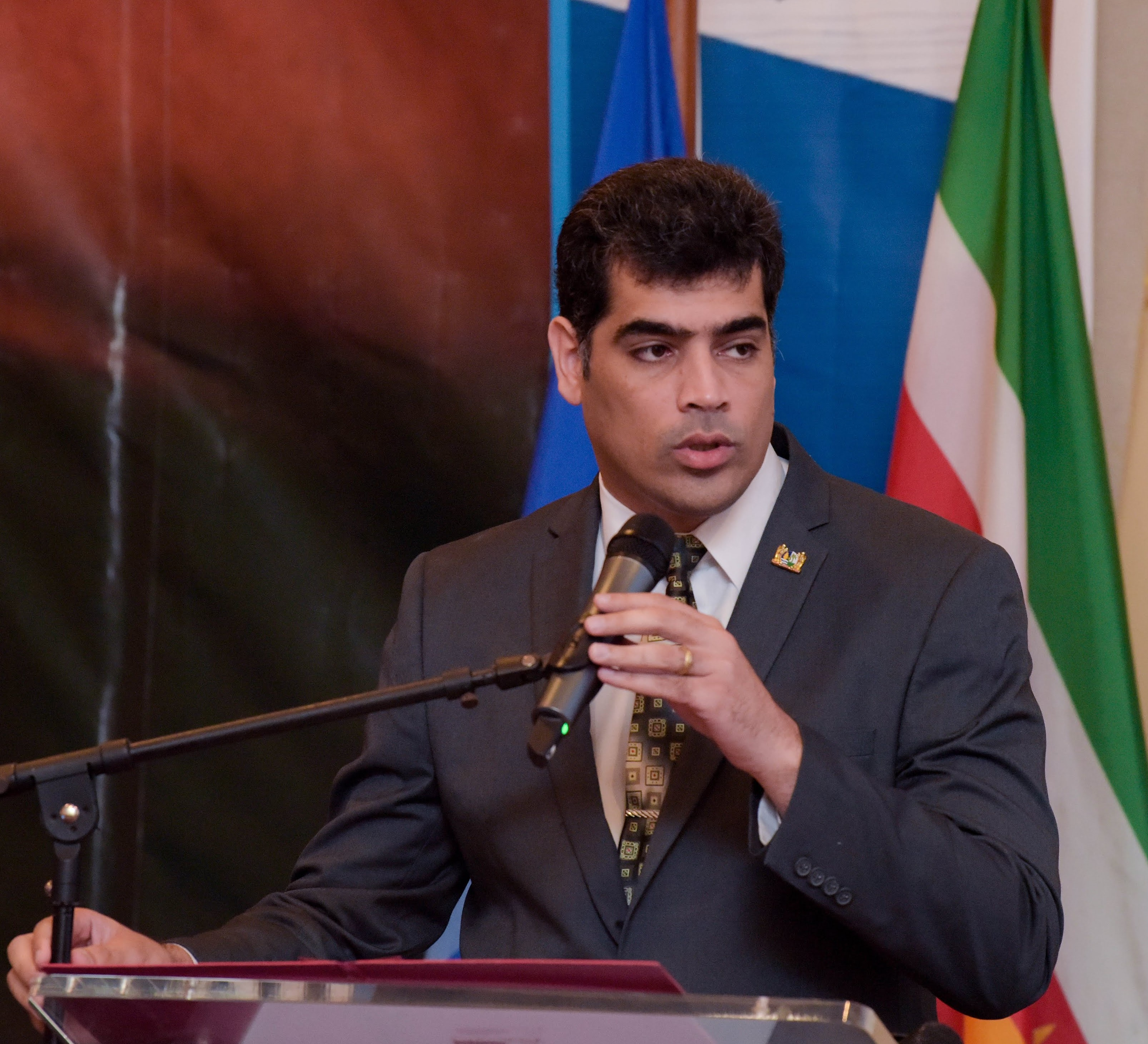
Ashwin Adhin – Vice President of Suriname

A National Public Health Response-team was set up in January 2020 who started to develop a response plan led by the director of the Ministry of Public Health, Cleopatra Jessurun. In cooperation with the Pan American Health Organization the Central Laboratory (Bureau voor Openbare Gezondheidszorg – B.O.G.) started to develop a test system for the virus which was completed on 5 February, and train healthcare workers. Tests were also being carried out at the Medical Microbiological Laboratory of the Academic Hospital Paramaribo.

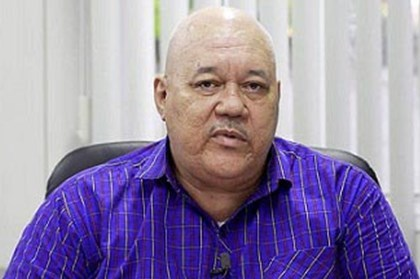
Jerry Slijngard

In March 2020 the council of ministers appointed a COVID-19 management team under the lead of the director of the Ministry of Public Health Cleopatra Jessurun and further consisted of:

- The director of Directorate National Security, Colonel Danielle Veira
- The director National Coordination Centre for Disaster Management (NCCR), Jerry Slijngard
- Representatives of the following Ministries:

Ministry of Education, Science and Culture; Ministry of Trade and Industry; Ministry of Public Works, Transport and Communications; Ministry of Defence; Ministry of Justice and Police;
Ministry of Regional Development; Ministry of Foreign Affairs; Ministry of Social Affairs and Public Housing; Ministry of Finance; Ministry of Agriculture, Husbandry and Fisheries; and

- Representative of the Bureau Public Health
- Representatives of several hospitals

To effectively manage the spread of the COVID-19 (SARS-Cov-2) and minimize the negative effects of the crisis on Public Health, Security and Economy, the government of Suriname made use of the Grondwet ('Constitution') article 72c to announce a Civil Exceptional Status and passed the Law 'Exceptional Condition' COVID-19 in Parliament.
Article 2 of the Law allowed for the establishment of a COVID-19 Crisis Management Team led by the Vice President of Suriname, Ashwin Adhin, and consisting of minimally the following members appointed by the President of Suriname Desi D. Bouterse:

- The director of Directorate National Security, colonel Danielle Veira
- The director of the Ministry of Justice and Police
- The director of the Ministry of Public Health, Cleopatra Jessurun
- The director National Coordination Centre for Disaster Management (NCCR), Jerry Slijngard
- The head of the National Hospital Council (NZR)
- The head of the Epidemiological crisis committee (resorting under the director of the Bureau for Public Health and consisting of two Surinamese Epidemiologists and two Public Health specialists)
- Two Surinamese infectiologists and a clinician.

The Law 'Exceptional Condition' also enabled the establishment of a Parliamentary Crisis Commission with Jennifer Simons as appointed head. The commission was to be informed of the measures the government took to manage the crisis and has the power to make binding decisions through Parliament on these measures with regard to compliance with the Law 'Exceptional Condition'. The Law had been extended by one month as of 10 July 2020. Ashwin Adhin was replaced by Ronnie Brunswijk.

After the general Surinamese 2020 election, the COVID-19 management team was replaced on 16 July 2020. Danielle Veira and Jerry Slijngard retired and COVID-19 would no longer be managed by the Directorate National Security. Amar Ramadhin, Minister of Health, became the new Director of the COVID-19 management team. Ronnie Brunswijk was placed in charged of the Parliamentary team. The medical team is headed by Marthelise Eersel, a former of Director Public Health. The medical specialists remain in the team.

== Statistics ==
=== Cases per district ===
Situation report of 17 July 2020
District	Number of cases	Population (2012 census)	Cases per 100K
Paramaribo	350	240,924	145
Wanica	166	118,222	140
Sipaliwini	85	37,065	229
Brokopondo (Note: Mainly Rosebel Gold Mines.)	68	15,909	427
Marowijne	58	18,294	317
Para	19	24,700	77
Saramacca	4	17,480	23
Nickerie	3	34,233	9
Commewijne	0	31,420	0
Coronie	0	3,391	0

== Vaccination ==
Suriname is receives its vaccins from the COVAX system, that has made a selection for Suriname for the AstraZeneca vaccine. In March 2021 Suriname received 50.000 vaccines from India as a friendly gesture. In the midst of April the number of vaccines run out, and at the beginning of May Suriname requested the Netherlands for help. On 15 May 2021, the Netherlands replied to donate 700.000 COVID-19 vaccines to Suriname. This is enough to vaccinate all adults in Suriname.

== See also ==
- Caribbean Public Health Agency
- COVID-19 pandemic in French Guiana
- COVID-19 pandemic in Guyana
- COVID-19 pandemic by country
- COVID-19 pandemic in South America
