= Eersel (surname) =

Eersel is a surname. Notable people with the surname include:

- Hein Eersel (1922–2022), Surinamese linguist and cultural researcher
- Marthelise Eersel (born 1957), Surinamese civil servant, physician and daughter of Hein Eersel
- Regian Eersel (born 1992), Surinamese-Dutch kickboxer
