= Danielle Veira =

Surinamese Army colonel and public official

Danielle Reana Karin Veira
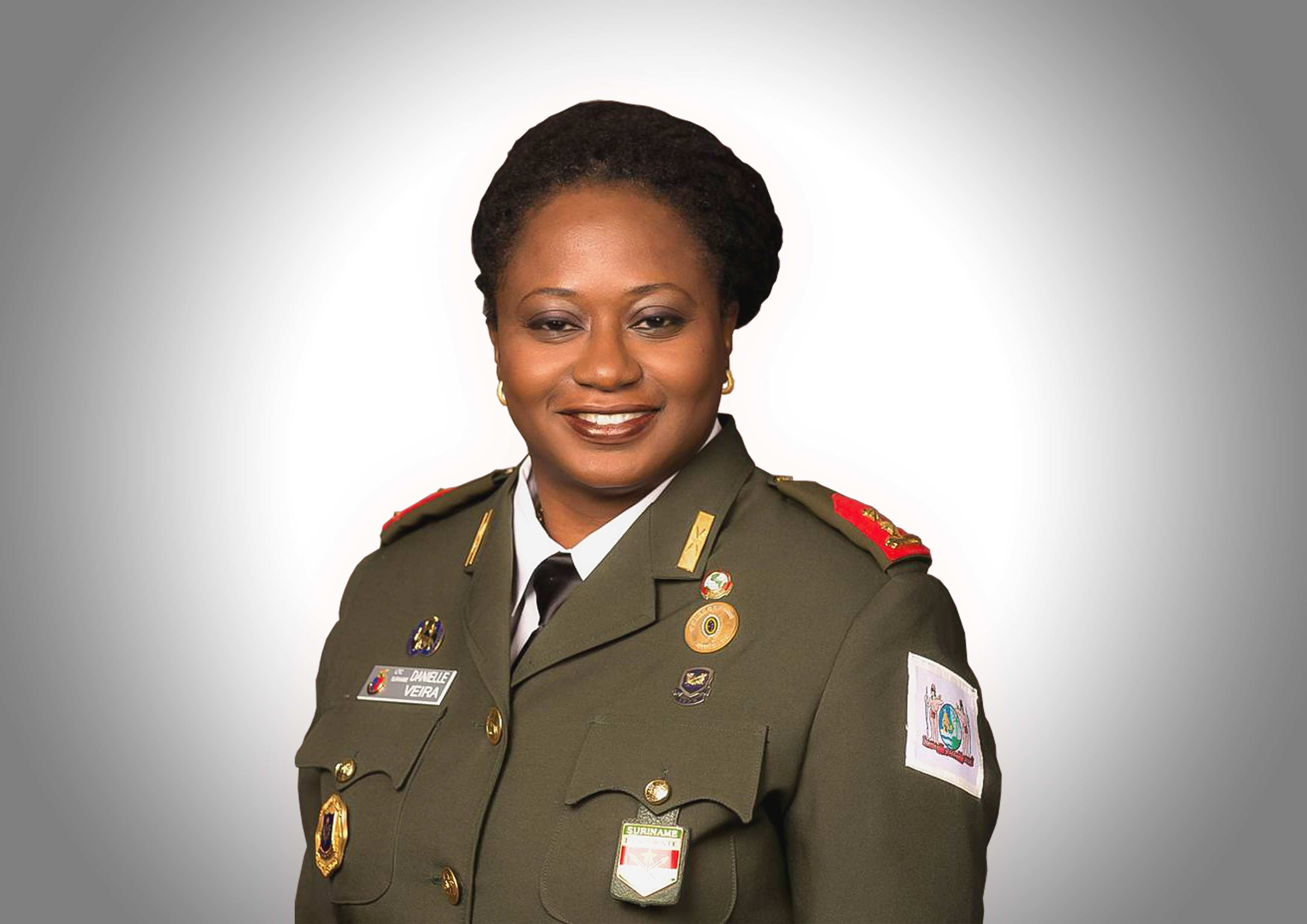
- Danielle Veira, circa 2016

Director of National Security
- In office 30 September 2016 – 17 February 2021

Director of the National COVID-19 Crisis Management Team
- In office 13 March 2020 – 16 July 2020

Personal details
- Born: 11 November 1970 (age 56) Paramaribo, Suriname
- Education: Anton de Kom University of Suriname (LL.M.); Duke University (M.A.); National Defense University (M.A.)

Military service
- Allegiance: Suriname
- Branch/service: Surinamese Land Forces
- Rank: Colonel

Danielle Veira (born 11 November 1970 in Paramaribo) is a Surinamese Army colonel and public official.

Veria graduated from the Anton de Kom University of Suriname in 2001 with an LL.M. In 2006, she earned an M.A. in international development policy from Duke University in Durham, North Carolina, United States. She also earned an M.A. in international strategic security studies in 2016 from the National Defense University in Washington DC. Between 2010 and 2016, Veira was Deputy Director of the Surinamese Ministry of Defence. As of 2016, Veira is a part-time professor at the Anton de Kom University.

In 2016 she was appointed to head the Central Intelligence Agency, which she merged with the Bureau National Security into the Directorate National Security. Since March 2020, she has been in charge of the National COVID-19 Management team which coordinates the fight against the Coronavirus pandemic in Suriname. Veira was the Director of the Directorate of National Security in the cabinet of the President of Suriname. On 15 February 2021, Vera was dismissed as Director of National Security effective 17 February.

== COVID-19 pandemic ==
At the announcement of the first COVID-19 infection in Suriname in 2020, Danielle Veira was put in charge of coordinating and managing the national response to the COVID-19 pandemic in Suriname After mass events were outlawed, her response - "Doe 't! = Do it!" - to a planned tequila party by the youth went viral.

After Antoine Joly, the French ambassador to Suriname, tested positive on 24 March 2020, Veira and some members of her team went into quarantine as they had been in close contact with Joly the previous week. Colonel Jerry Slijngard was appointed as Acting Director in her absence. She returned to resume her duties on 2 April 2020.

On 8 April 2020, the law Exceptional Condition COVID-19 (State of Emergency) was approved by the National Assembly. This law formally authorized the COVID-19 Crisis Management Team, on which Veira served in her capacity as Director of National Security. After the 2020 election, the COVID-19 Crisis Management Team members were replaced on 16 July 2020 by the incoming government.
