= John Percy Leon Lewis =

Guyanese military officer (1943–2020)

John Percy Leon Lewis (February 13, 1943 – April 7, 2020) was a Guyanese military officer who died during the COVID-19 pandemic.

Lewis studied at the University of the West Indies in Jamaica. He started to work at the Demerara Bauxite Company as an engineer. There he met Major Arnold Godette who persuaded Lewis to join the Army. In 1968, Lewis became the only reserve officer to become a full Colonel. Lewis had also been president of the Guyana Rugby Football Union. He is believed to have been Guyana's sixth coronavirus victim, dying 12 days after his wife Juliet Lewis who died on March 27 from pneumonia. The couple had been married for 52 years. The first confirmed case of COVID-19 in Guyana was recorded on March 11, 2020. Lewis was diagnosed COVID-19 positive after his death.

== Accomplishments ==
- Deputy Commandant of The Guyana Peoples Militia
- Longest serving reserve officer in Guyana with over 30 years of service.
- Only reserve officer to become a full Colonel by moving up from a Reserve Subaltern in 1968.
- Only reserve officer to be awarded the Military Service Medal.

== See also ==
- COVID-19 pandemic in Guyana
- COVID-19 pandemic in South America
