= Jerry Slijngard =

Surinamese Army colonel and public official

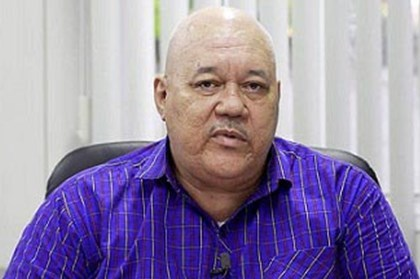

Director of the National Coordination Centre for Emergency Management (NCCR)
- Incumbent
- Assumed office 2003

Director of the Coast Guard
- Incumbent
- Assumed office 2013

Military service
- Allegiance: Suriname
- Branch/service: Surinamese Land Forces
- Rank: Colonel

Jerry Slijngard is a Surinamese Army colonel and public official. In 2003, he was appointed to head the National Coordination Centre for Emergency Management (NCCR). In 2013, he was appointed to head the newly created Coast Guard.

== COVID-19 pandemic ==
At the announcement of the first COVID-19 infection in Suriname, Slijngard was appointed as a member of the National COVID-19 Crisis Management Team, tasked with coordinating the national response to the COVID-19 pandemic in Suriname. After Antoine Joly, the French ambassador to Suriname, tested positive on 24 April 2020, Danielle Veira, the Director of the COVID-19 Crisis Management Team, went into quarantine. Jerry Slijngard was appointed as Acting Director in her absence. Veira returned to resume her duties on 2 April 2020.

On 8 April 2020, the law Exceptional Condition Covid 19 (State of Emergency) was approved by the National Assembly. This law created the COVID-19 Crisis Management Team, on which Slijngard served in his capacity as Director of the National Coordination Centre for Emergency Management (NCCR)

On 11 June 2020, it was announced that Jerry Slijngard, part of the COVID-19 management team, had tested positive for COVID-19. He was released from hospital on 24 June after recovering. After the 2020 election, the COVID-19 Crisis Management Team members were replaced on 16 July 2020 by the incoming government.
