= University of Suriname Library =

The University of Suriname Library is the library of the Anton de Kom University of Suriname (AdeKUS).

The university library was started in 1970 with the thesis collection, two years after the official opening of the university in 1968. Initially, the library was located at 118 Dr. Sophie Redmondstraat, where the law faculty was also located. Later, the library was moved to the AdeKUS campus; this is the Central Library (CB). There is also a Medical Library (MB); it is located at Professor W.J. Kernkampweg 3.
