= Marthelise Eersel =

Surinamese biostatician

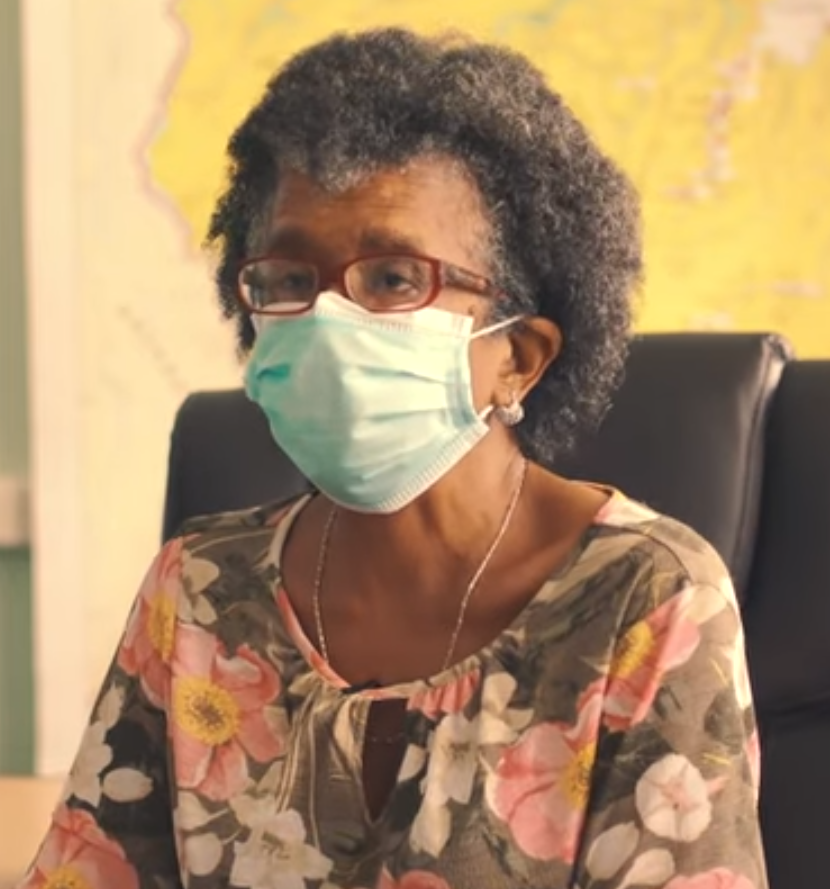
Eersel in 2020

Marthelise Eersel (born 6 April 1957) is a Surinamese civil servant and physician. Previously the director of the Ministry of Health, she was director of the Suriname COVID-19 Crisis Management Team from July 2020 to May 2021.

== Early life ==
Eersel was born in Amsterdam on 6 April 1957. Her father Hein Eersel was studying at the University of Amsterdam. They moved back to Suriname in February 1959, where her younger sister Rachel was born a few months later.

== Education and career ==
Eersel trained as a physician at the University of Suriname. She also completed a Master of Science in Public Health (MSPH) at Tulane University School of Public Health and Tropical Medicine in 1989. She has taught public health and biostatistics at the Institute for Graduate Studies & Research of the Anton de Kom University in Public Health, and was a director at the Ministry of Health. She represented Suriname on the WHO Executive Board.

In July 2020, Eersel succeeded Cleopatra Jessurun as director of the national COVID-19 Crisis Management Team. She served in this position until May 2021.

In 2020, the Marthelise Eersel Center was established in Nickerie. This medical centre, which specialises in treating chronically-ill patients, is a government agency as part of the One Stop Shop (OSS) Foundation.
