= France–Suriname relations =

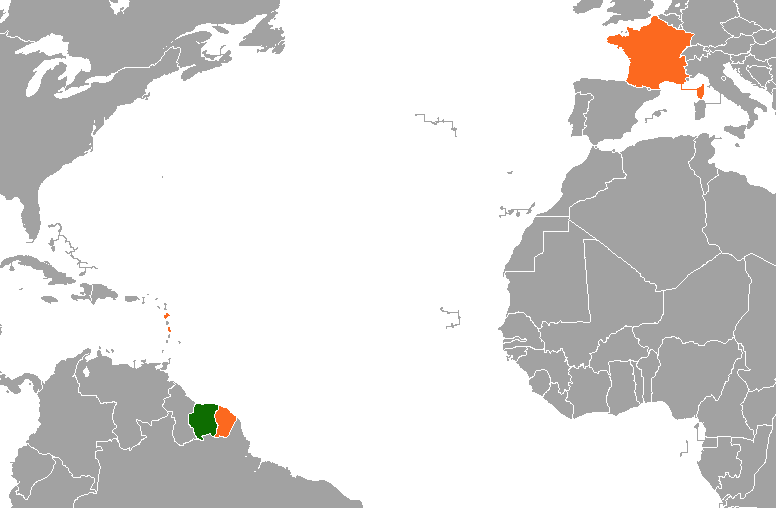
- Suriname: France

Diplomatic relations between France and Suriname were established on 25 August 1976. Suriname and the French overseas department of French Guiana share a common border of 520 kilometres (320 mi). Suriname operates an embassy in Paris, a consulate in Cayenne, and an honorary consulate in Saint-Laurent-du-Maroni. France operates an embassy in Paramaribo, a consulate in Georgetown, Guyana, and an honorary consulate in Albina.

== History ==
Suriname became an independent country on 25 November 1975. The initial relationship between Suriname and France was cautious. An embassy in Paramaribo was opened in 1976, however France wanted to negotiate the border dispute. In June 1979, Suriname was offered US$100 million in aid, if a quick resolution to the dispute was reached. In October 1979, the Arron government announced its willingness to relinquish the claim, however the deal was strongly opposed and not ratified.

On 25 February 1980, Desi Bouterse committed a coup d'état. This resulted in the Surinamese Interior War which started in 1986 in Marowijne District near the border with French Guiana. About 10,000 refugees settled in French Guiana, and were housed in Acarouany, Charvein and other camps. France remained neutral during the conflict, and started negotiations with the Suriname National Army and the Jungle Commando which cumulated in the signing of the Kourou Accords on 21 July 1989. The accords, however, were sabotaged by the army, and the final peace accords were ratified in August 1992.

In December 1991, the borders between the countries officially reopened. In 1975, Suriname and French Guiana were economically comparable, however by 2000, there was a large difference in economic power, which resulted in a continuing migration into French Guiana. In 2009, immigrants from Suriname constituted 9.6% of the population of French Guiana. The border town of Saint-Laurent-du-Maroni has grown from 5,055 in 1974 to 45,576 in 2018, and the main language spoken in Saint-Laurent is Sranan Tongo. In 2011, Suriname opened a large embassy in Paris to signify France's importance to Suriname, however in 2017, the building was put up for sale.

In 2020, the COVID-19 pandemic resulted in close cooperation between Suriname and France. The border is now jointly patrolled by both governments, a joint police post has been established, and there is extensive cooperation.

As of 2021, the territorial dispute remains unsolved.

=== Aluku ===
The Aluku people are maroons who escaped from Dutch plantations in Suriname. In the late 18th century, the Dutch colonists in alliance with the Ndyuka people declared war on the tribe, and chased them into French Guiana. On 25 May 1891, the Aluku chose French citizenship. In 2018, the population was estimated at 9,800 people in French Guiana.

=== Saramaka ===
The Saramaka maroons were originally from Suriname. They first came to French Guiana in the 19th century as freighters to the interior. During the gold rush, their services became important for the economy. In 1883, the Governor of French Guiana and the Granman (paramount chief) of the Saramaka, signed an official accord that Samarakas could stay in French Guiana under the legal authority of the Granman. The accords have never been rescinded and allow the tribe entry to French Guiana without the risk of deportation. In 2013, there were an estimated 25,000 Saramakas living in French Guiana.

== Transportation ==
There is ferry service between Albina and Saint-Laurent-du-Maroni. The ferry provides a direct connection with the East-West Link in Suriname and RN1 in French Guiana. Plans have been developed to build a bridge between Albina and Saint-Laurent-du-Maroni, however as of 2021, no action has been taken.

== Trade ==
France and Suriname have a small presence in each other's economies. In 2019, Suriname exported US$34.5 million worth of goods to France with the main export product being refined petroleum, and bananas. In 2019, France exported US$14.5 million to Suriname with the main export being liquor.

== Ambassadors of France to Suriname ==
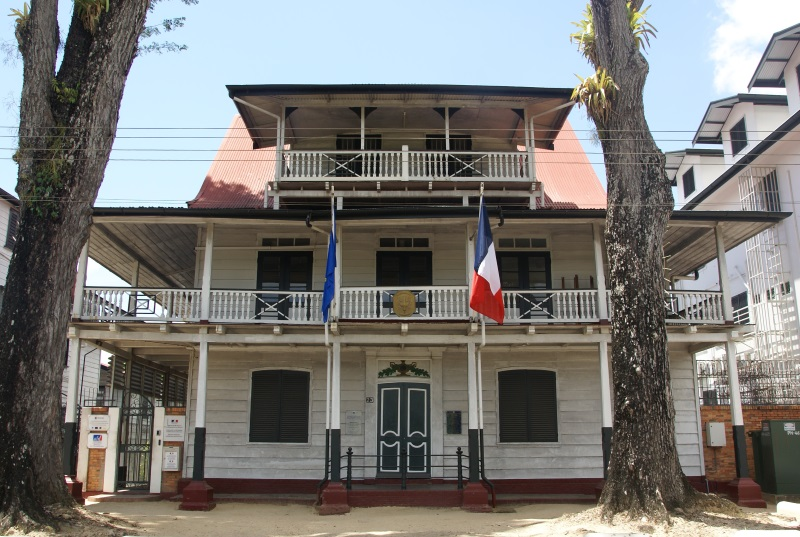
Embassy of France in Paramaribo

Until 1991, only chargé d'affaires were appointed.

- Pierre Boillot (1991–1994)
- Jacques Nizart (1994–1998)
- Olivier Pelen (1998–2004)
- Jean-Marie Bruno (2004–2007)
- Richard Barbeyron (2007–2010)
- Joël Godeau (2010–2013)
- Michel Prom (2013–2017)
- Antoine Joly (2017–2021)
- Pierre Lanapats (2021)

== Ambassadors of Suriname to France ==
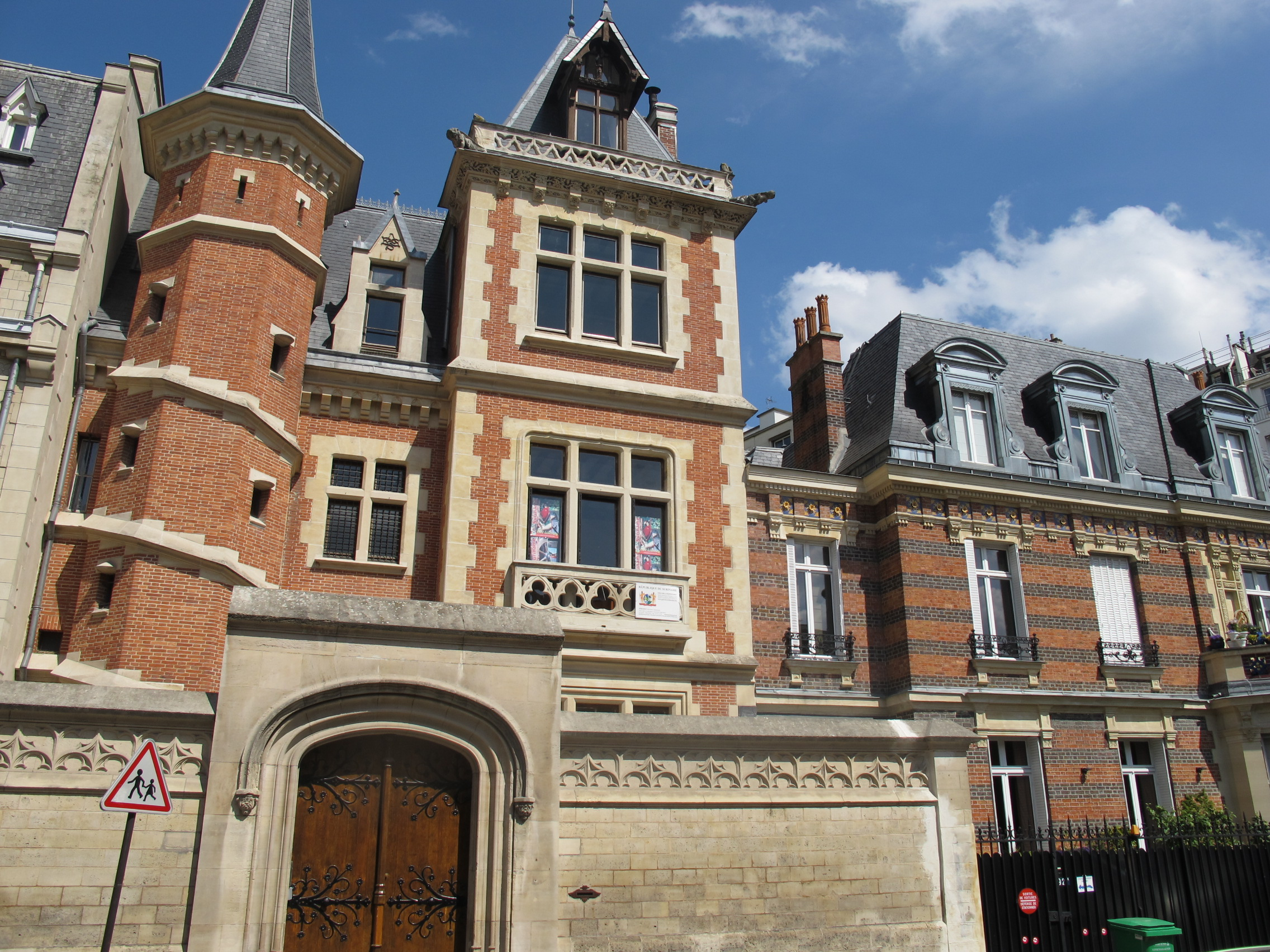
Embassy of Suriname in Paris

Until 2011, only consuls were appointed.

- Harvey Naarendorp (2011–2015)
- Reggy Nelson (2015–2022)
- Henry Ori (2022)

== See also ==
- Foreign relations of France
- Foreign relations of Suriname
