= .sr =

Internet country code top-level domain for Suriname

- Introduced: 3 September 1991
- TLD type: Country code top-level domain
- Status: Active
- Registry: Telesur
- Sponsor: Telesur
- Intended use: Entities connected with Suriname
- Actual use: Used in Suriname. Also used in Republika Srpska
- Registration restrictions: Terms
- Structure: Registrations are made directly at the second level
- Registry website: https://isp.datasur.sr/

.sr is the Internet country code top-level domain (ccTLD) for Suriname. This top-level domain is operated by Telesur, the local telecom company.

It was also used in the Republic of Srpska and former Serbian Krajina to denote "Srpska Republika" under the .rs.sr subdomain.

It is considered to be a generic top-level domain by Google.

== See also ==
- Internet in Suriname
- ISO 3166-2:SR
