= Telecommunications in Suriname =

Telecommunications in Suriname includes radio, television, fixed and mobile telephones, and the Internet.

== Radio ==
- Broadcast stations: 1 state-owned radio station; multiple private radio stations (2007).
- Radios: 300,000 sets (1997).

== Television ==
- Broadcast stations: 2 state-owned TV stations; multiple private TV stations (2007).
- Televisions: 63,000 sets (1997).

== Telephones ==
- Calling code: +597
- International call prefix: 00
- Main lines: 5 lines, 209th in the world (2015).
- Mobile cellular: 0 lines, 208th in the world (2015).
- Domestic: Combined fixed-line and mobile-cellular teledensity is 185 telephones per 100 persons; microwave radio relay network (2010).
- International: Facilities are good (2010).
- Satellite earth stations: Two Intelsat (Atlantic Ocean) (2010).
- Communications cables: Suriname-Guyana Submarine Cable System (SGSCS) linking Trinidad, Guyana, and Suriname and the Americas II fiber optic submarine communications cable linking the United States, Puerto Rico, the U.S. Virgin Islands, Martinique, Curaçao, Trinidad, Venezuela, French Guiana, and Brazil with terrestrial extensions to Suriname and Guyana.

== Internet ==
The Internet was available in Suriname through Telesur from November 1995; subscribers could choose either full access or email only. Internet access is common and widely available in major cities, but less common in remote areas of the interior with limited bandwidth and often no access to electricity.

- Top-level domain: .sr
- Internet users: 194,269 users, 154th in the world; 34.7% of the population, 123rd in the world (2012).
- Fixed broadband: 32,192 subscriptions, 120th in the world; 5.7% of population, 98th in the world (2012).
- Wireless broadband: Unknown (2012).
- Internet hosts: 188 hosts, 201st in the world (2012).
- IPv4: 44,032 addresses allocated, less than 0.05% of the world total, 78.6 addresses per 1000 people (2012).
- Internet service providers: Two ISPs offer dial-up Internet access, two provide wireless access, and a further two provide access using ISDN. One provider offers access using DSL.

=== Internet censorship and surveillance ===
There are no government restrictions on access to the Internet and the government asserts that it does not monitor e-mail or Internet chat rooms without judicial oversight. However, journalists, members of the political opposition and their supporters, and other independent entities report government interference or oversight of email and social media accounts.

The law provides for freedom of speech and press, and the government generally respects these rights in practice. Members of the local and international press corps report threats of violence directly linked to their coverage of the amendment to the amnesty law. The president's official spokesperson publicly criticized and intimidated journalists who reported on negative public reaction to the amendment. Some media members practice self-censorship in response to pressure and intimidation by senior government officials or community leaders on journalists who publish negative stories about the administration. In addition many news outlets are affiliated with particular political parties, which discourages journalists from reporting on some subjects. The law prohibits arbitrary interference with privacy, family, home, or correspondence, and the government generally respects these prohibitions in practice. The law requires search warrants, which are issued by quasi-judicial officers who supervise criminal investigations.

== See also ==
- Telesur, government owned Telecommunications Company of Suriname.
- ICT Association of Suriname
