= Multilingual education in Africa =

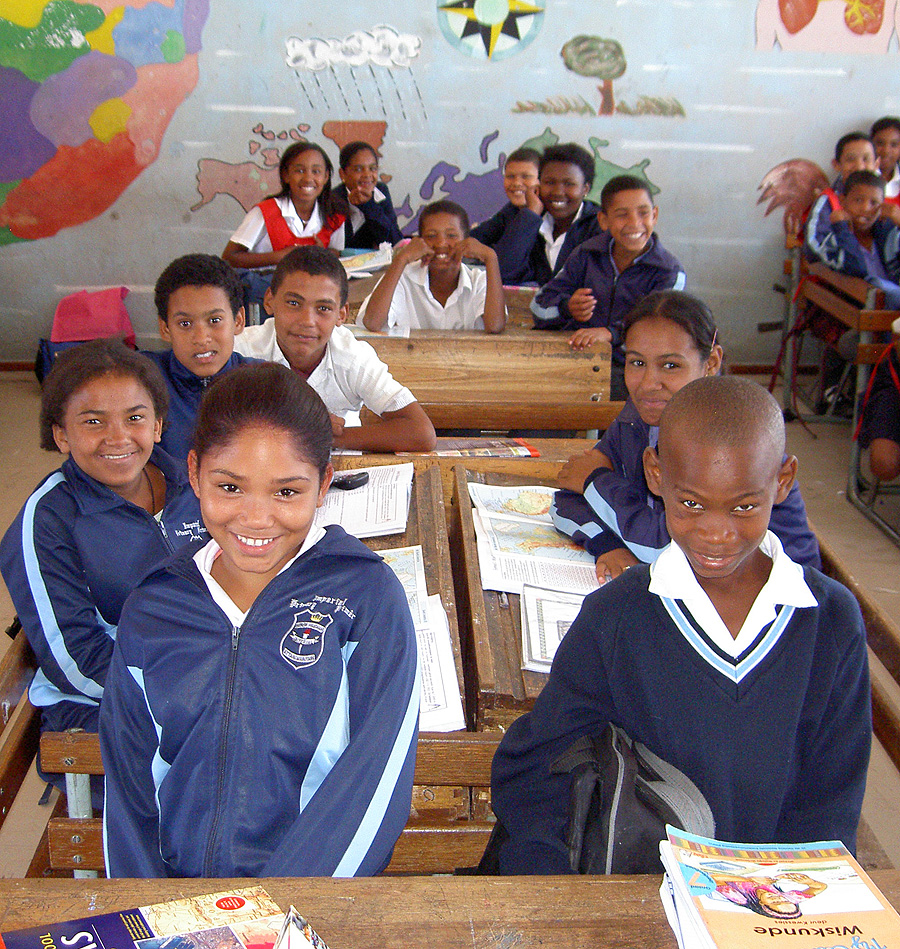
Grade-school students in a classroom in South Africa.

Multilingual education in Africa is an outlook on how to approach teaching students in the different states in Africa considering the different possible languages to use for instruction. The continent experiences an immense diversification of languages spoken in its different states; therefore, like in other diversely populated regions in the world, there are many choices for which languages to use as the medium of instruction, in which specific areas, and to what extent. This is a dilemma that researchers and policy makers have been looking into for years and has left African countries with diverse solutions for teaching language in their schools.

== Introduction ==
The necessity of multilingual education in Africa relies on families, schools, and other related organizations to make complex decisions on which languages should be considered essential and how they should be implemented in education curricula. A common notion is that using international languages as a medium of instruction, commonly corresponding to the state's European colonial power (such as French in Sénégal or English in South Africa), is more advantageous for a child at an early age to begin developing so that they become more employable in the future. However, as formal education is usually in the colonial tongue, it is problematic that the local community and even the instructors often do not communicate in those languages fluently. In most cases, children benefit more from education in their mother tongue or the local language of the place of instruction than they do from instruction in a language received from a former colonial power. Linguistic experts have researched this phenomenon and identified the different routes that African states have taken to address the subject.

=== Colonial influence ===
European colonization has shaped how language developed across many African states and colonial legacies continue to inform how language is used. Most African states' modern government and societal infrastructures were developed by the relevant colonial power during the period between colonization and independence, including its methods of implementing education. Even today, some countries which have had colonial influence on Africa insist on characterizing their language as the most essential language to teach in Africa. Some scholars even argue that English is the most important language to incorporate into African education, despite the prominence of mother-tongue languages that already exist in the local communities. As we can see below, different international actors have diverse ideas on the most effective strategies for implementing multilingual education in African states.

== Language education strategies ==
=== UNESCO's findings ===
The United Nations (UN) serves as one of the significant parties in influencing language choices in the education curricula of not only African nations, but of many other nations in the world. The agency within the UN that works primarily in this role is UNESCO, which differentiated between the weak and strong bilingual models for African students in their study. UNESCO observed that weak bilingual models tend to incorporate an early-exit method of instruction such as teaching the student for one to four years in the local language or the student's mother tongue, before switching to the second language. In contrast, strong bilingual models tend to incorporate a late-exit method which would have a target objective of fluency in both the languages, i.e., language one (L1; the mother tongue) and language two (L2; the secondary language).

One to four years of instruction in the local tongue has not shown to be sufficient because children in developing countries or poor communities generally do not have the capacity to switch from their L1 by the end of grade 3 and be simultaneously proficient in the curriculum. A study of South African grade 6 students who were educated through an L1 medium on average received a national achievement score of 69%, whereas those who were educated with an L2 achieved only 32%.

==== Multilingual strategies ====
UNESCO concludes that there are about four models that yields the best results for multilingual education in Africa:

1. L1 as a medium of instruction in primary and secondary school, with additional languages learned as electives. This is a model used in South Africa, where Afrikaans learners would be taught in Afrikaans and have one English lesson a day.
2. Six to eight years taught in L1 followed by dual-medium instruction. It is a model also used in South Africa.
3. Eight years taught in L1 followed by a complete switch to L2 by the ninth year. This is a model that has been used in Ethiopia where its students achieved an 83.7% pass rate when it was initially implemented versus a significant decrease to 44% when it was removed.

=== Bargaining theory ===
A common strategy that organizations and individuals use to influence multilingual education is sensitization. This is used as a means for elites to substantiate language choices in education. The strategy was incorporated through the research of Ericka Albaugh when she researched the process choosing language mediums in sub-Saharan Africa. In 2007, Albaugh introduced her bargaining theory method in her article entitled "Language Choice in Education: A Politics of Persuasion" which explains five key players who influence the decision of which language to use as the medium of instruction in Africa: nationalist leaders, bureaucrats, the ministry of education, parents and the regional elites.

- Nationalist leaders (mixture of both L1 and L2) face different recommendations in language reform based on the constituents that they represent.
- Bureaucrats (L2 preference) mostly consider using the mother tongue ineffective as a medium of instruction. Even in Ghana, for instance, some schools have ignored policies that instruct them to use L1 to an extent.
- The Ministry of Education (L1 preference) generally complies with the decision made by regional elites, as Albaugh claims lawmakers tend to face potential social sanctions if they try to introduce language reform.
- Parents (mixed preference of both L1 and L2) are divided on the preference of language used, primarily by age; younger parents are almost twice as resistant to using L1 instruction in schools than older ones for common reasons such as the economic advantages of learning European languages being more applicable.
- Regional elites (L1 preference) tend to advocate the benefits of using L1s based on observations made in their own regions.

=== International actors ===
Just like the UN, there are numerous NGOs and other IGOs which attempt to improve education in underdeveloped nations, including those in Africa, such as the Peace Corps, a United States volunteer agency that states their mission of education in Africa is to work with students to improve their learning capabilities and with teachers to improve their teaching ability in the English language. A prominent international NGO that has been working on multilingual education development on the ground in Africa for over fifty years is SIL, which introduced a mother tongue program called PROPELCA alongside prominent education leaders in Africa. The program was designed to facilitate teaching English and French through instruction in the mother tongue. Advocacy for this instructional design started in the Cameroon General Conference in 1995 by Maurice Tadadjeu, a professional linguist who worked with SIL. After receiving positive feedback, the design was tested in schools in Senegal and determined to be a success. Today, it is used as a template for teaching even more international languages through mother-tongue instruction due to further implementation and success in the West African countries of Cameroon, Ghana, and Senegal.
