= Anton de Kom University of Suriname =

University in Suriname

Coordinates: 5°48′50″N 55°12′59″W

Anton de Kom University
- Anton de Kom Universiteit
- Motto: Kennis maken en kennis delen in duurzaam partnerschap
- Motto in English: Creating and sharing knowledge in sustainable partnership
- Established: 1 November 1968; 57 years ago
- Chancellor: Prof. Dr. Shanti Venetiaan
- Students: 3737 (2022)
- Location: Paramaribo, Suriname
- Website: https://www.uvs.edu

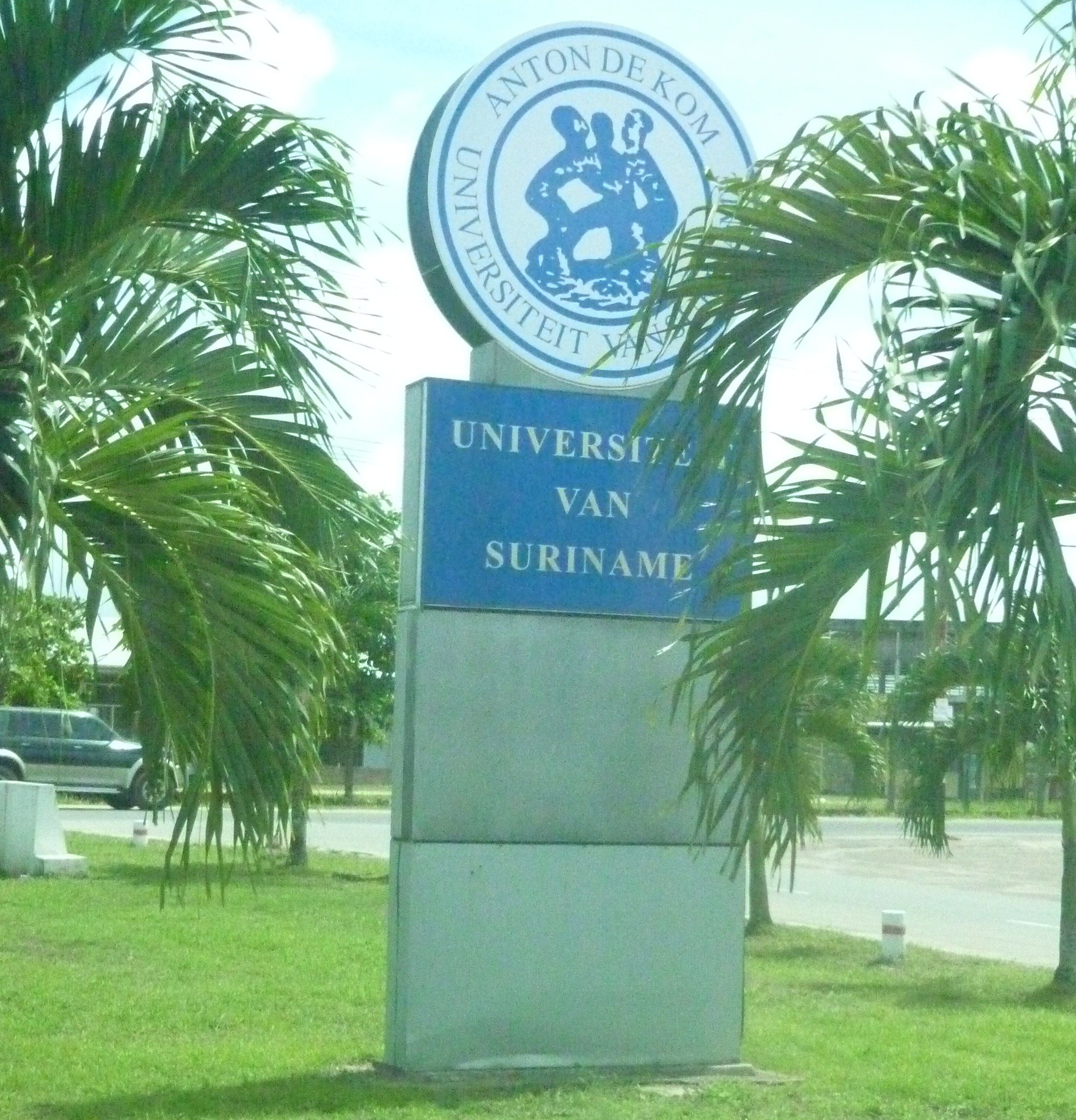
Sign outside Anton de Kom University of Suriname

Anton de Kom University (Dutch: Anton de Kom Universiteit van Suriname) is the only university in Suriname. It is located in the capital, Paramaribo, and named for Anton de Kom, an anti-colonialist activist who was killed by the Nazis while in exile in the Netherlands.

== History ==
=== Founding ===
Tertiary education in Suriname dates back to the 19th century. In 1882 there was already tertiary education provided at the Geneeskundige School and there also existed an organized juridical education (The Law-school), which was founded in the late forties. Furthermore, there were other para-university courses, namely the discipline to become a surveyor, dentist and pharmacist.

At the centenary of the Estates of Suriname in 1966, this organization took the important decision to cooperate with the government of Suriname to found a university. The proclamation was made on 1 November 1968, in the then still existing Theatre Star. Since then, the first of November is celebrated as Founders' Day.

Linguist Hein Eersel was appointed as the first chancellor of the University of Suriname. The Faculty of Law opened first, and other faculties followed:

- The Faculty der Medische Wetenschappen on 26 September 1969
- The Faculty der Sociaal – Economische Wetenschappen on 1 November 1975
- The Faculty der Natuurtechnische Wetenschappen on 1 December 1976
- The Faculty der Technische Wetenschappen on 1 December 1977

=== Renaming ===
The university was closed from December 1982 until 17 October 1983, when it was renamed after Anton de Kom.

== Faculties ==
The Anton de Kom University of Suriname has the following faculties:

- The Faculty of Medical Sciences
  - Medicine, Physiotherapy and Public Health
- The Faculty of Social Sciences
  - Law
  - Economics, main subjects General Economics and Business Economics
  - Management of Education and the Study of Social Changes within Society
  - Public Administration
  - Sociology
  - Business Management
  - Psychology
- The Faculty of Technological Sciences
  - Agricultural Production, main subjects Soil Sciences, Forestry, Agriculture, Animal Husbandry
  - Mineral Production, main subjects Geology, Mining
  - Electrical Engineering, main subjects Energy Technique, Information Technology
  - Infrastructure, main subjects Building and Construction, Civil Engineering, Geoinformatics, Land and Water Management
  - Environmental Sciences, main subjects Management of Aquatic Resources, Management of Environmental and Natural Resources
  - Mechanical Engineering, main subjects Production Technology, Engineering Mechanics and Materials, Process and Energy
- The Faculty of Humanities
  - Dutch
  - History
- The Faculty of Mathematical and Physical Sciences
  - Chemistry
  - Mathematics
  - Biology
  - Physics

== Board ==
The University Board is the highest governing body of the University and has the entire responsibility of the organization. Prof. Dr. Jack Menke is the current president.

== Research institutes ==
There are five research centers doing research within their specific fields, and also rendering services to the community. The following are research centers:

- Centre for Agricultural Research in Suriname (CELOS)

Objective: promoting agricultural scientific education and research at the Faculty of Technological Sciences

- Institute for Applied Technology (INTEC)

Objective: executing research projects in the field of technology

- Bio-Medical Research Institute Prof. dr. Paul Flu (MWI)

Objective: promoting scientific education and research at the Faculty of Medical Sciences

- Institute for Development Planning and Management (IDPM)

Objective: supporting the development policy of the Surinamese government

- Institute for Social Science Research (IMWO)

Objective: executing social scientific research and rendering service

=== Other institutes ===
- Institute of International Relations (IIR/Adekus)
- Library Anton de Kom, University of Suriname

== Regulations for registration ==
Foreign students who meet the relevant minimum requirements must master the Dutch language to be able to follow the classes. They may submit a petition to the Ministry of Education via the University Board.

== Notable alumni ==
- Alice Amafo Surinamese Minister of Agriculture and Housing
- Niermala Badrising Surinamese ambassador to the United States
- Marinus Bee Chairman of the National Assembly of Suriname
- Marthelise Eersel Surinamese physician and former Director of the Ministry of Health
- Winston Lackin former Surinamese Minister of Foreign Affairs
- Irene Lalji former Surinamese lawyer and television presenter
- Yldiz Pollack-Beighle former Surinamese Minister of Foreign Affairs
- Gregory Rusland Leader of the National Party of Suriname
- Dew Sharman Vice Chairperson of the National Assembly of Suriname
- Jennifer Simons former Chairperson of the National Assembly of Suriname

== See also ==
- Communications in Suriname
