= Centre for Agricultural Research in Suriname =

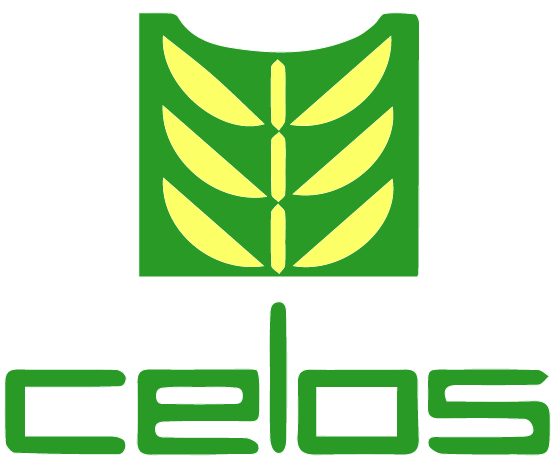
CELOS Logo

The Centre for Agricultural Research in Suriname or CELOS is an agricultural and forestry research institute established in Suriname in 1967. It was originally part of Wageningen University and Research. It is affiliated with the Anton de Kom University of Suriname (ADEK) and its Department of Agriculture of the Faculty of Technology.

The research institute conducts research into Agriculture and Animal Science, Forestry, Wood Technology, Tissue culture, Soil Science, Biodiversity, Agronomy, Agro forestry, GIS and Remote Sensing (NARENA), Aquaculture and Fish Ecology. It is known for the CELOS Management System (CMS) and its research into sustainable forest management.
