= Irene Lalji =

Surinamese lawyer and television presenter (died 2021)

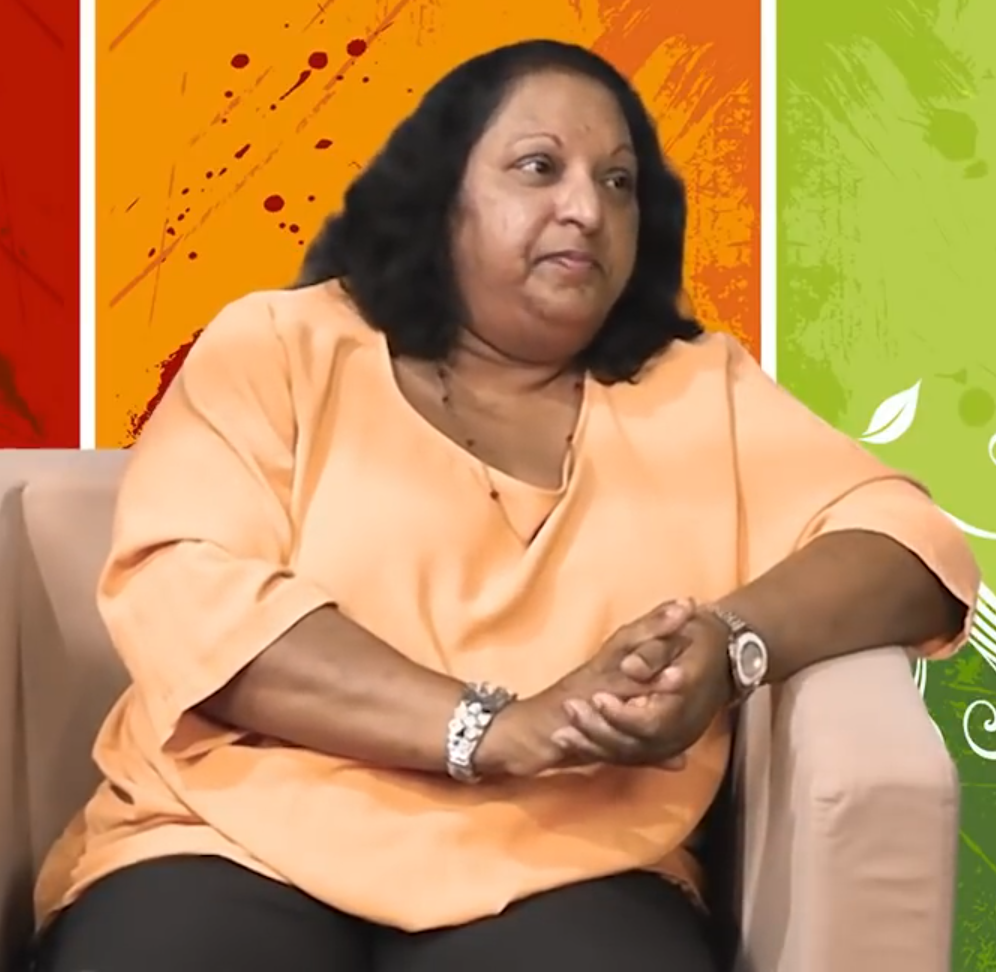
- Interviewed on Artiesten Club
- Died: 2 November 2021; Suriname
- Other name: Irene Asarfi-Lalji
- Education: Anton de Kom University of Suriname
- Occupation: Lawyer

Irene Lalji (died 2 November 2021) was a Surinamese lawyer and television presenter.

She was involved with several publicized legal cases, in the last of which she defended former finance minister Gillmore Hoefdraad.

== Biography ==
Lalji's father was a goldsmith. Her mother was a housewife at first, but became a school cleaner during a national economic downturn. Lalji began her career at the Legislation Bureau of the Ministry of Finance. Later on, she moved to the registry of the district court system, intending to become a court clerk. She graduated in law from the Anton de Kom University of Suriname. Soon after, she moved to private practice due to issues with the management at work. In the internship years that followed, she received no wages and was supported by her then-husband. They had one son.

Her criminal law mentor during these years was Oscar Koulen. She sometimes worked with Irwin Kanhai, who was associated with the same law firm as Koulen. She had two other mentors in the field of private law. In 1998, Lalji was admitted as a lawyer, and started her own law firm. In addition to her work as a lawyer, she championed better working conditions in the courthouse. On the television channel RBN, Lalji hosted the program DeJure, where she would discuss common legal issues citizens can encounter.

Lalji took on numerous cases in areas such as drug trafficking, murder, domestic violence, sex crimes, and embezzlement. She also served in cases that attracted publicity: she defended the son of minister Roline Samsoedien in a 2019 assault case, and in the 2020 corruption case regarding the Surinamese Postal Savings Bank (SPSB), she represented the Trinidadian suspect. She also defended former minister Gillmore Hoefdraad in the corruption scandal surrounding De Surinaamsche Bank. At the start of the COVID-19 pandemic in Suriname, she represented the interests of a group of 150 stranded Surinam Airways passengers.

In October 2021, Lalji publicly criticised the government for mandating COVID-19 tests of unvaccinated public service employees, as the employees were required to pay for the tests themselves. She herself did not receive the vaccine despite having underlying conditions. By mid-October, she was hospitalized after contracting COVID-19. She died from the effects of the virus on 2 November 2021.
