= Multilingual education =

Multilingual teaching

Multilingual education (MLE) typically refers to "first-language-first" education, that is, schooling which begins in the mother tongue, or first language, and transitions to additional languages. Typically, MLE programs are situated in developing countries where speakers of minority languages, i.e. non-dominant languages, tend to be disadvantaged in the mainstream education system. There are increasing calls to provide first-language-first education to immigrant children from immigrant parents who have moved to the developed world. When students move to a new country, language and cultural barriers can affect their academic progress and well-being. Some suggest that providing instruction in their first language initially, as part of multilingual education (MLE) programs, could help ease their transition. By recognizing and respecting their linguistic and cultural backgrounds, these programs aim to create a supportive learning environment where students feel more comfortable and confident. While this approach may contribute to the preservation of heritage languages, implementing MLE programs present other potential benefits and challenges.

In addition to the first-language-first approach, another model that supports language development in multilingual contexts is plurilingual education. Plurilingual education works by having students develop multiple languages at once; instead of using one language, it uses the language skills of two (or more) languages to bridge the gap in learning.

== Components of multilingual education (MLE) ==
- "Strong Foundation" – Research shows that children whose early education is in the language of their home tend to do better in the later years of their education. Being fluent in their first language can be an advantage for students learning a second language. When learning an additional language, they can use skill and knowledge in their dominant language to support their learning. However, students with limited proficiency in their first language may find the transition more difficult, since they cannot rely on a strong linguistic base. For more information about the effect of "language of instruction", see Bilingual education.
- "Strong Bridge" – An essential difference between MLE programs and first language programs is the inclusion of a guided transition from learning through the first language to learning through another language. While the strong bridge approach aims to facilitate a smooth transition between languages, some students may still have difficulties adjusting to learning in a new language. Adequate support and instructional strategies are necessary to ensure that students can effectively transfer their skills and knowledge from one language to another.

Related to the emphasis on children's first languages, is the implicit validation of their cultural or ethnic identities by taking languages that were previously considered "non-standard" and making active use of them in the classroom. Multilingual education in that regard underscores the importance of children's worldviews in shaping their learning.

== Stages of multilingual education programs ==
A widespread understanding of MLE programs (UNESCO, 2003, 2005) suggests that instruction take place in the following stages:

1. Stage I – learning takes place entirely in the child's home language
2. Stage II – building fluency in the first language. Introduction of oral language two.
3. Stage III – building oral fluency in language two. Introduction of literacy in language two.
4. Stage IV – using both language one and language two for lifelong learning.

MLE proponents stress that the second language acquisition component is seen as a "two-way" bridge, such that learners gain the ability to move back and forth between their first language and the other language(s), rather than simply a transitional literacy program where reading through the first language is abandoned at some stage in the education.

== Examples of multilingual education around the world ==
=== Multilingual education in Andhra Pradesh/Orissa (India) ===
In Andhra Pradesh and Orissa, multilingual education (MLE) programs have been implemented using a thematic approach. These programs focus on helping tribal children rediscover their culture and language by using a seasonal calendar that reflects their cultural context. The MLE programs prioritize teaching children in their first language first, before introducing a second language. This approach recognizes the importance of cultural identity and language in learning. It allows students to build a strong foundation in their first language, which then helps them transition to learning a second language. The programs draw on various educational theories, including critical pedagogy, the idea that education should empower individuals, and theories that focus on how children learn and develop. What makes these programs unique is that they actively involve the community in creating the curriculum. By doing so, they aim to make education more relevant to the community's needs and values. By combining cultural relevance, language development, and community involvement, these MLE programs in Andhra Pradesh and Orissa aim to create an inclusive education system that respects and values local cultures and languages.

=== Multilingual education in Odisha (India) ===
In Odisha, a multilingual state in India, the government recognized the linguistic diversity of the region, with over 40 ethnic languages spoken among the 62 tribes, as well as widely spoken Modern Indian Languages like Hindi, Bengali, and Telugu. To address the educational needs of ethnic minority children in schools, the Odisha government implemented a multilingual education (MLE) program. Under the leadership of Dr. Mahendra Kumar Mishra as the Director of Multilingual Education, and with guidance from renowned multilingual experts Prof. D.P. Pattanayak and Prof. Khageswar Mahapatra, the MLE program was launched in 547 schools. The focus was on ten tribal languages: Santali, Saora, Kui, Kuvi, Koya, Kishan, Oroam, Juang, Bonda, and Ho.

To provide culturally responsive education, the program developed curriculum and textbooks for classes I to V, emphasizing a first language-based multilingual education approach for tribal children. Teachers from the respective language communities were appointed to teach in the schools, ensuring a stronger connection between the students and their teachers. The MLE program also received support from the Summer Institute of Linguistics, led by Mr. Steve Simpson, Vicky Simpson, and Pamela Mackenzie. Tribal teachers, guided by MLE resource groups, actively contributed to the development of the curriculum and textbooks. Since its initiation in 2005, the program has expanded to 2250 schools, primarily serving tribal children. The MLE program in Odisha has gained recognition as a sustained initiative in Asian countries, with representatives from seven Asian countries visiting the MLE schools to learn from their experiences and best practices. It stands as an example of successful multilingual education implementation in a region with significant linguistic diversity.

=== Multilingual education in developed countries ===
Scholars and educators have argued that embracing the diverse linguistic knowledge that immigrant students bring to developed countries and using students' first-languages to help them learn English may be an inexpensive and effective way to integrate and socialize immigrant youth. Allowing code-switching in schools with high English learner (EL) populations can increase the potential for enhanced English-learning and academic performance. Code-switching between multi-lingual children can create an informal peer-mentorship structure that embraces immigrant children's linguistic capabilities to drive learning, create a strong peer-network, and enhance the development of English-as-a-second-language skills for immigrant students in multi-ethnic schools.

Private and public schools in countries like the United States offer Mandarin Chinese and other global languages. These programs aim to provide a strong language education from elementary school all the way to university. One purpose is to help students become highly skilled in these languages to boost business and other interests that could benefit the country. This could also have an impact on promoting different kinds of multilingualism and building relationships between foreign countries in the future.

The Socrates Schools in Montreal provide an example of multilingual education, with students taught in French, Greek and English.

==== Multilingual education in Oslo (Norway) ====
A Norwegian study by Sandra Elen Jacoby found that some teachers think multilingualism is valuable when students are proficient in their first languages and can use that knowledge in other languages. The study defined multilingualism as speaking more than two languages and having a different first language than most people in their country. The author determined that one problem teachers faced was when students were weak in both the first language and the language of learning, leading teachers to feel less confident in teaching them. The study suggests that how helpful multilingualism is depends on how well the students can speak the languages.

Additionally, the research showed that many teachers have not received enough training on how to teach students who speak multiple languages, and they could benefit from learning more about multilingualism and how to help students with different language backgrounds. In the study, teachers often used vocabulary learning to help students with language development. Overall, these findings suggest that teacher education programs should offer better training on language skills and effective strategies for teaching multilingual students. This way, teachers will have the right knowledge and tools to handle the challenges that come up in classrooms with students who speak different languages.

== Challenges of implementing a multilingual education program ==
As with any educational program or initiative, there are potential downfalls and challenges with providing a multilingual education.

Limited Resources: Implementing multilingual education (MLE) programs can be challenging due to the need for extensive resources, including trained teachers, instructional materials, and support staff/services. Some schools or educational systems may struggle to acquire sufficient resources to effectively establish and sustain these programs. To ensure that students reap the benefits of multilingual education, it is crucial to have qualified teachers proficient in multiple languages and access to instructional materials in different languages. However, meeting this requirement can be difficult, resulting in a slower progress of multilingual education unless teachers receive additional training in multilingual education.

Competing Demands: In MLE programs, teaching multiple languages can create competing demands on the curriculum and meeting both language objectives and academic standards can be challenging. Finding a balance between teaching different languages and other subjects can be challenging and time constraints may cause teaching multiple languages to impact the quality of instruction in other areas. Educators must, therefore, strike a balance between subject content and language proficiency when teaching.

Language Gaps: In MLE programs, language proficiency gaps can emerge when students' proficiency in their first language is significantly lower than the language of instruction used in the larger group. This can make it difficult for them to catch up and achieve academic proficiency in both languages. Assessing and evaluating the effectiveness of these programs is crucial, but accurately measuring language proficiency and content knowledge presents a challenging task.

Segregation: MLE programs can sometimes cause separation based on language, which divides the school community. This can prevent students from interacting with different cultures and creating a diverse learning environment. Some MLE programs focus only on a few languages, leaving out others spoken in the community, which reduces diversity. Limited community support for multilingual initiatives is often due to different language preferences and attitudes towards multilingualism. These varying opinions can directly or indirectly affect the success of multilingual education programs.

== See also ==
- Language education
- Linguistic diversity
- Multilingualism
- Multilingual education in Africa
- Plurilingualism
- Bilingual education
