= Telesur (Suriname) =

Logo

The Telecommunications Company Suriname (Telesur) is the government-owned full telecommunications service provider for Suriname. The services provided by Telesur include telephone, internet and Wireless CDMA, GSM, UMTS, HSPA+ and LTE. Telesur is currently running a 900/1800 Mhz GSM, a 2100 MHz HSDPA, and a 450Mhz CDMA EVDO network.

Telesur manages and operates the .sr country code top-level domain.

== History ==
Telesur was founded on May 1, 1945, under the name ’s Lands Telegraaf Telefoondienst (“National Telegraph Telephone Service”), LTT, and was formed from the merger of the ’s Lands Radiodienst (“National Radio Service”), (established in 1925) and the ’s Lands Telefoonwezen, (“National Telephone Entity”), (founded in 1907). Twenty-eight years later, the company's name was changed to ’s Lands Telegraaf Telefoonbedrijf (National Telegraph and Telephone Company). In 1981, the name was officially changed to Telesur. Twenty-six years later, Telesur lost its monopoly position by the introduction of the Telecommunications Services Law in Suriname. In 2008, Telesur expanded its operations to the Netherlands.

TeleG Logo

== TeleG ==
TeleG is the mobile telecommunication service of the Telecommunications Company Suriname, Telesur. It was released in 2002, to provide in Global System for Mobile Communications (GSM) technology.

=== 3G launch ===
TeleG 3G logo

In October 2011, TeleG launched their 3G network. However, in 2012, some of its users faced a bad internet connection or were not able to make or receive a phone call. Later that year they re-launched their 3G network and a better service was acquired. The service was only available in the capital, Paramaribo, and several parts of Nickerie (district), Commewijne (district), Wanica (district), Para (district) and Marowijne (district).

=== 4G launch ===
TeleG 4G logo

On November 15, 2013, TeleG released their 4G network. Telesur was already working on the transition from 3G to 4G. The investment had cost a total of 10 million U$. The 4G coverage would only be available for 56 locations in Paramaribo and Commewijne that year. In the beginning of 2014, Telesur expanded their 4G coverage. At the end of 2014 Telesur reached their set goal; to have total coverage of 4G in all parts of Suriname. The average user of TeleG would experience a download speed of 10MBPS. Next to Telesur, the European-Based network Digicel, has launched their 4G network. The launch took place in July 2014.

== Internet ==
To deliver internet services Telesur used to do that under the trademark name Tele.i. The "i" in Tele.i. stands for Internet, therefore Tele.i. means Telesur internet. Currently Telesur no longer delivers internet services under that name, but just under the Telesur internet trademark name. The internet services that are provided by Telesur are broadband internet, dedicated internet, streaming, web hosting, internet calling, domainname registration.

== See also ==
- Telecommunications in Suriname
- List of mobile network operators of the Americas
- List of telecommunications regulatory bodies
