= COVID-19 pandemic in South America =

Aspect of viral disease pandemic

- Disease: COVID-19
- Pathogen: SARS-CoV-2
- Location: South America
- First outbreak: Wuhan, Hubei, China
- Index case: São Paulo, Brazil
- Arrival date: 26 February 2020 (6 years, 7 months and 2 days ago)
- Confirmed cases: 67,331,547
- Recovered: 65,102,593
- Deaths: 1,344,031
- Territories: 14

The COVID-19 pandemic was confirmed to have reached South America on 26 February 2020 when Brazil confirmed a case in São Paulo. By 3 April, all countries and territories in South America had recorded at least one case.

On 13 May 2020, it was reported that Latin America and the Caribbean had reported over 400,000 cases of COVID-19 infection with, 23,091 deaths. On 22 May 2020, citing the rapid increase of infections in Brazil, the World Health Organization declared South America the epicentre of the pandemic.

As of 12 January 2023, South America had recorded 67,331,547 confirmed cases and 1,344,031 deaths from COVID-19. Due to a shortage of testing and medical facilities, it is believed that the outbreak is far larger than the official numbers show.

== Statistics by country and territory ==
Summary table of confirmed cases in South America (as of 15 December 2023)
Country/Territory	Cases	Active cases	Deaths	Recoveries	Ref
Brazil	37,449,418	123,266	701,494	36,241,001	
Argentina	10,073,633	no data	130,680	no data	
Colombia	6,384,224	no data	142,747	no data	
Chile	5,326,918	311	62,158	5,264,449	
Peru	4,520,102	no data	221,564	no data	
Bolivia	1,209,626	no data	22,407	no data	
Ecuador	1,066,409	no data	36,036	no data	
Uruguay	1,040,596	no data	7,656	no data	
Paraguay	736,133	no data	19,933	no data	
Venezuela	543,811	1,868	5,809	536,134	
French Guiana	98,041	no data	413	no data	
Suriname	82,588	31,407	1,408	49,773	
Guyana	73,499	166	1,281	69,746	
Falkland Islands	1,923	no data	0	no data	
Total	34,359,631	1,947,427	1,047,229	32,102,586	

=== South America and Latin America ===
Summary table of confirmed cases in Latin America (selected regions as of 12 January 2023)
Countries and territories	Cases	Deaths	Recoveries (Note: Reported recoveries. May not correspond to actual current figures and not all recoveries may be reported. Total recoveries may not necessarily add up due to the frequency of values updating for each location.)	Population (in millions)	Ref
South America	67,331,547	1,344,031	65,102,593	430	
Mexico	7,284,502	331,333	6,519,926	128	
Panama	1,027,247	8,584	1,016,577	4	
Dominican Republic	650,990	4,384	644,785	11	
Costa Rica	1,171,802	9,104	860,711	5	
Guatemala	1,214,861	20,033	1,182,221	17	
Honduras	468,048	11,088	95,000	10	
Total	67,619,768	1,346,290	65,632,715	605	

== Timeline by country and territory ==
=== Argentina ===
COVID-19 pandemic cases in Argentina

The COVID-19 pandemic in Argentina is part of the worldwide pandemic of coronavirus disease 2019 (COVID-19) caused by severe acute respiratory syndrome coronavirus 2 (SARS-CoV-2). As of 18 September 2026, a total of 10,119,840 people were confirmed to have been infected, and 130,859 people were known to have died because of the virus.

On 3 March 2020, the virus was confirmed to have spread to Argentina. On 7 March 2020, the Ministry of Health confirmed the country's first documented death, a 64-year-old man who had travelled to Paris, France, who also had other health conditions; the case was only confirmed as positive after the patient's demise.

On 19 March 2020, a nationwide lockdown was established in Argentina. The lockdown was lifted throughout all the country, excepting the Greater Buenos Aires urban area (where 31.9% of the country's population live), on 10 May, with Greater Buenos Aires locked down until 17 July, where the lockdown was due to be gradually loosened in several stages to lead to the return to normality; restrictions were extended several times until 8 November 2020. During the second wave, another nationwide lockdown took place from 22 to 31 May 2021.

Responses to the outbreak have included restrictions on commerce and movement, closure of borders, and the closure of schools and educational institutions. Clusters of infections and deaths have occurred in nursing homes, prisons and other detention centers, and urban areas. The number of tests increased over time, although there were some concerns as there was less testing than in other countries of the region such as Chile and Peru. Even so, the government's responses to the pandemic were among the best received by the population in the region during the early stages of the pandemic.

=== Bolivia ===
The COVID-19 pandemic in Bolivia was a part of the worldwide pandemic of coronavirus disease 2019 (COVID-19) caused by severe acute respiratory syndrome coronavirus 2 (SARS-CoV-2). The virus was confirmed to have spread to Bolivia on 10 March 2020, when its first two cases were confirmed in the departments of Oruro and Santa Cruz.

On 12 March, Bolivia suspended all public school sessions until 31 March, as well as all commercial flights to and from Europe indefinitely. They also prohibited large-scale public gatherings of more than 1,000 people.

=== Brazil ===
The COVID-19 pandemic in Brazil has resulted in 38,050,567 confirmed cases of COVID-19 and 704,066 deaths. The virus was confirmed to have spread to Brazil on 25 February 2020, when a man from São Paulo who had traveled to Italy tested positive for the virus. The disease had spread to every federative unit of Brazil by 21 March. On 19 June 2020, the country reported its one millionth case and nearly 49,000 reported deaths. One estimate of under-reporting was 22.62% of total reported COVID-19 mortality in 2020.

The COVID-19 pandemic triggered a variety of responses from federal, state and local governments, having an impact on politics, education, the environment, and the economy. On 27 March 2020 Brazil announced a temporary ban on foreign air travelers and most state governors have imposed quarantines to prevent the spread of the virus. President Jair Bolsonaro perpetuated conspiracy theories surrounding COVID-19 treatments and its origins, and was accused of downplaying effective mitigations and pursuing a strategy of herd immunity. In October 2021, a congressional panel recommended criminal charges against the president for his handling of the pandemic, including crimes against humanity.

As of 18 September 2026, Brazil, with 38,050,567 confirmed cases and 704,066 deaths, has the third-highest number of confirmed cases and second-highest death toll from COVID-19 in the world, behind only those of the United States and of India.

=== Chile ===
The worldwide pandemic of coronavirus disease 2019 (COVID-19) caused by severe acute respiratory syndrome coronavirus 2 (SARS-CoV-2) severely affected Chile. The virus was confirmed to have reached Chile on 3 March 2020. Initial cases had been imported from Southeast Asia and Europe, and expanded into a large number of untraceable infections, placing the country within phase 4 of the pandemic as defined by the World Health Organization, with over 1,000 confirmed cases by 25 March 2020.

The cases were concentrated in the Santiago metropolitan area, with outbreaks in other regions in the country. No national lockdown was established in Chile, unlike in neighboring Argentina and Peru, although a night curfew was implemented throughout the country. Quarantines were established locally in different cities and neighborhoods. However, in May 2020 the whole city of Santiago was put under mandatory quarantine due to an increase of cases, and similar situations were extended to most of the largest cities in Chile.

Considering its population, by June 2020 Chile had one of the worst outbreaks in the world. Initially, the number of fatalities reported was lower than in other countries in South America, even those with fewer cases. However, in May 2020, the number of cases and deaths increased rapidly, while several sources reported excess deaths not officially attributed to COVID-19, which were not counted. By June 2020, the government confirmed thousands of additional deaths due to COVID-19, including suspected cases where PCR tests were not available. The pandemic reached a peak on 13 June with 195 daily confirmed deaths and nearly 7,000 positive cases. By July 2020, 10,000 people had died, and Chile had the sixth largest number of cases in the world. In the following weeks, the number of daily cases and deaths started to decrease slowly, although some local outbreaks appeared. The number of cases increased later in the year, and by March 2021 the number of daily cases had exceeded those in the initial wave.

Chile became one of the first countries to start a nationwide program to vaccinate against COVID-19. On 24 December 2020, the first batch of vaccines arrived in the country to inoculate mainly health workers. With larger batches of vaccines (mainly Sinovac's CoronaVac) arriving from February 2021, Chile became one of the fastest countries in the world to inoculate their population: by March 2021 a quarter of the population had received at least one dose. This fast response was due to signing contracts with multiple providers, a strong public immunization program, and little anti-vaccine sentiment. Despite the success of the vaccination program the number of cases increased, which has been attributed to early relaxation of restrictions and a false sense of security.

With more than 92,000 cases and 2,500 deaths per million inhabitants, the impact of the pandemic has been great in the South American country. In March 2020, when the first cases of COVID-19 were reported, the country was still facing protests and riots (Note: As a result of the COVID-19 pandemic, many of those who suffered eye injuries during the 2019–2020 protests have not been able to continue their treatments. In the cases where injured have gone to hospital for treatment and supervision some have had to share rooms with COVID-19 patients.) that had begun in October 2019, and the pandemic affected the scheduled 2020 Chilean constitutional referendum, which was rescheduled and held later in the year. Partial lockdowns and quarantines were established in the first months, hitting the economy of the country. By April 2020, unemployment had reached 9%, a ten-year high. A wave of protests sparked in late May, mainly in Santiago, due to food shortages in certain sectors of the population. The Chilean GDP shrank by a 5.8% in 2020, the largest recession in 40 years in the country. Chile is the only country in the world with entry procedures such as requiring homologation of vaccines to travel to.

=== Colombia ===
The COVID-19 pandemic in Colombia was a part of the pandemic of coronavirus disease 2019 (COVID-19) caused by severe acute respiratory syndrome coronavirus 2 (SARS-CoV-2). The virus was confirmed to have reached Colombia on 6 March 2020.

Up to January 2022, four waves affected Colombia: Infections and deaths peaked in August 2020, again in January 2021 following the Christmas holidays, reached new highs between April and June 2021, and a fourth wave was confirmed in late December 2021 following the arrival of the Omicron variant of SARS-CoV-2.

"Confirmed COVID-19" was the primary cause of death in Colombia in 2020, where the virus caused over 50,000 fatalities by the end of the calendar year. An additional 13,000 deaths in Colombia that year were suspected to be caused by COVID-19, making "suspected COVID-19" the third most common cause of death. The "confirmed COVID-19" death toll doubled during the first half of 2021, reaching 100,000 before the end of June (including all deaths from the beginning of the pandemic).

=== Ecuador ===
Confirmed COVID-19 cases in Ecuador

On 29 February 2020, the Minister of Health in Ecuador, Catalina Andramuño, confirmed the first case of the virus in the country. The person, an elderly woman, was an Ecuadorian citizen residing in Spain who had arrived to Guayaquil on 14 February without showing symptoms. She fell ill and was hospitalized, where she was diagnosed with COVID.

On 1 March 2020, Andramuño announced that five new cases of coronavirus have been confirmed in Ecuador.

As of 31 March 2020, there have been 2240 confirmed cases, plus 75 deaths linked to COVID-19. The Health Ministry also reported 61 deaths probably related to COVID-19.

Ecuador was described in April 2020 as emerging as the "epicentre" of the pandemic in Latin America. The Guayas Province was particularly strongly affected, with thousand of excess deaths reported compared to the figure for a normal period. It was reported on 17 April 2020 that 10,939 people had died in six weeks since the start of March in the Guayas Province, compared to a normal figure of 3,000 for the province.

=== Falkland Islands ===
On 3 April 2020, the British Overseas Territory of the Falkland Islands confirmed its first case on 3 April 2020. Furthermore, as a precaution, the islands' government has closed all schools and nurseries until 4 May. As of 30 April, all 13 cases have recovered.

=== French Guiana ===
On 4 March 2020, the first 5 cases were found the French overseas department and region of French Guiana, and the first death was announced on 20 April 2020.

=== Guyana ===
The COVID-19 pandemic in Guyana was a part of the worldwide pandemic of coronavirus disease 2019 (COVID-19) caused by severe acute respiratory syndrome coronavirus 2 (SARS-CoV-2). The virus was confirmed to have reached Guyana on 11 March 2020. The first case was a woman who travelled from New York, a 52-year-old woman with underlying health conditions, including diabetes and hypertension. The woman died at the Georgetown Public Hospital.

=== Paraguay ===
On 7 March the first confirmed case in Paraguay was announced, a 32-year-old Paraguayan who arrived from Ecuador.

On 10 March, Paraguay suspended public school sessions and large-scale public events for 15 days due to the coronavirus.

On 13 March, Paraguay suspended flights coming from Europe.

=== Peru ===
In Peru, the COVID-19 pandemic has resulted in 4,533,862 confirmed cases of COVID-19 and 221,072 deaths. The virus spread to Peru on 6 March 2020, when a 25-year-old man who had travelled to Spain, France, and the Czech Republic tested positive. On 15 March 2020, President Martín Vizcarra announced a country-wide lockdown, closing borders, restricting domestic flights, and forbidding nonessential business operations, excluding health facilities, grocery stores, pharmacies, and banks. As of May 2023, Peru has the highest COVID-19 death rate in the world, with over 6,400 deaths per one million citizens.

=== Suriname ===
On 13 March 2020, Vice President Ashwin Adhin announced the first confirmed case in the country.

On 3 April, the first death was announced.

On 3 May, all remaining COVID-19 cases recovered.

On 18 May, an eleventh case was identified.

On 11 August, President Santokhi announced a series of measures requiring the use of face masks, reducing operating practices of restaurants, and prohibiting groups of 5 or people from gathering except for work, education, religious gatherings and funerals. A national curfew would be in place from 21:00 to 5:00 everyday until 23 August.

=== Uruguay ===
The COVID-19 pandemic in Uruguay has resulted in 1,043,295 confirmed cases of COVID-19 and 7,697 deaths.

The first cases in Uruguay were reported on 13 March 2020 by the Ministry of Public Health. The early cases were imported from Italy and Spain, with some local transmissions. The majority of early cases were traced to a wedding with 500 people in attendance in Montevideo, attended by a Uruguayan fashion designer who returned from Spain and later tested positive. Various containment measures were introduced in mid-March, and major restrictions on movement followed in late March. Uruguay is one of the few countries in Latin America to have been able to avoid large outbreaks for a considerable amount of time due to their closing of borders with neighboring countries. The country had one of the lowest numbers of active cases per population in South America up until December when the public health authorities announced that large outbreaks had led to community transmission in Montevideo. On 23 January 2021, President Luis Lacalle Pou announced during a press conference that the government purchased doses of COVID-19 vaccines from Pfizer and Sinovac Biotech, while negotiating with a third manufacturer.

=== Venezuela ===
On 13 March, Vice President Delcy Rodríguez announced the first two confirmed cases in the country.

On 14 March, Communication Minister Jorge Rodríguez informed that eight new cases were detected in the country.

On 26 March, the first death was reported.

Diosdado Cabello, vice-president of the United Socialist Party of Venezuela and president of the pro-government Constituent National Assembly announced he tested positive for COVID-19 on 9 July.

Tareck El Aissami, the Minister of Petroleum and Omar Prieto, the Governor of Zulia also tested positive on 10 July.

A member of the 2017 National Constituent Assembly and the Governor of the Capital District, Darío Vivas tested positive for COVID-19 on 19 July.

Venezuela Minister of Communication and Information Jorge Rodríguez tested positive for COVID-19 on 13 August. On the same day, Darío Vivas died of COVID-19 at the age of 70.

Venezuela is particularly vulnerable to the wider effects of the pandemic because of its ongoing socioeconomic and political crisis causing massive shortages of food staples and basic necessities, including medical supplies. The mass emigration of Venezuelan doctors has also caused chronic staff shortages in hospitals.

== Prevention in other countries and territories ==
=== South Georgia and the South Sandwich Islands ===
This remote territory is uninhabited, save for small communities of scientists; the territory is also occasionally visited by small groups of tourists. On 17 March tourist facilities in Grytviken were closed as a precaution, with various other measures being implemented to protect workers on the islands. South Georgia is open for visitors with a permit and is still virus free as of 22 April.
