= ICT Association of Suriname =

- ICT Associatie van Suriname
- Abbreviation: ICT-AS
- Formation: 20 January 2011
- Purpose: Trade association for ICT companies
- Location: Paramaribo, Suriname
- Members: 60 (2021)
- Website: https://ict-as.sr/

The ICT Association of Suriname (Dutch: ICT Associatie van Suriname) is a Surinamese trade association for companies whose core business is related to Information technology and computing. Members are required to be registered with the Suriname Chamber of Commerce and Factories.

The association was founded on 20 January 2011 by five companies. It grew to 49 members by 2016, and to 60 members by 2021.

In addition to representing its members, the ICT-AS also organizes public events to promote computer science education. In cooperation with the ITU and the Telecommunications Authority of Suriname, it has held an annual Girls in ICT Day in Paramaribo and similar events in other parts of Suriname.

In June 2013, together with the Suriname Association of IT Professionals (SVI), the ICT-AS organized the first international IT Summit in Paramaribo. The IT Summit, with participants from the Netherlands, the United States and the Caribbean, was repeated in 2014, 2015 and 2016. The conferences addressed industry developments, trends, and opportunities. Datasur launched the first cloud hosting service based in Suriname at the 2014 summit.

In January 2020, a new board of directors was elected, with Anuskha Sonai as the chair. The new board plans to work toward a digital economy for the country to increase opportunities for technology entrepreneurship.
