= COVID-19 pandemic in Guyana =

- Disease: COVID-19
- Pathogen: SARS-CoV-2
- Location: Guyana
- First outbreak: New York City
- Index case: Georgetown
- Arrival date: 11 March 2020 (6 years, 7 months, 2 weeks and 3 days)
- Confirmed cases: 23,675 (2021-08-17)
- Recovered: 22,050
- Deaths: 582

Government website
- https://www.health.gov.gy

The COVID-19 pandemic in Guyana was a part of the worldwide pandemic of coronavirus disease 2019 (COVID-19) caused by severe acute respiratory syndrome coronavirus 2 (SARS-CoV-2). The virus was confirmed to have reached Guyana on 11 March 2020. The first case was a woman who travelled from New York, a 52-year-old woman with underlying health conditions, including diabetes and hypertension. The woman died at the Georgetown Public Hospital.

== Background ==
On 12 January 2020, the World Health Organization (WHO) confirmed that a novel coronavirus was the cause of a respiratory illness in a cluster of people in Wuhan City, Hubei Province, China, which was reported to the WHO on 31 December 2019.

The case fatality ratio for COVID-19 has been much lower than SARS of 2003, but the transmission has been significantly greater, with a significant total death toll.

== Timeline ==
Cases

Deaths

=== March ===
On 11 March 2020, the first case of coronavirus was recorded in Guyana from a 52-year-old woman with underlying health conditions, including diabetes and hypertension. The woman died at the Georgetown Public Hospital.

On 18 March, the Guyana Civil Aviation Authority closed the country's airports to incoming international passenger flights for 14 days. All schools were closed.

On 19 March, the Guyana Civil Aviation Authority (GCAA) closed Guyanese airspace to all international arrivals.

On 23 March, the Courts of Guyana announced limited or suspended operations.

On 25 March, Karen Gordon-Boyle, Deputy Chief Medical Officer, announced that only people exhibiting signs of COVID-19 infection or who have traveled abroad will be tested. The Pan American Health Organization had supplied Guyana with 700 testing kits and 400 screening kits.

On 31 March, Ubraj Narine, the Mayor of Georgetown, said that he would not be implementing lockdowns or curfews in contrast to neighboring cities.

=== April ===
On 1 April 2020, a second death was announced. The deceased was a 38-year-old former Emergency Medical Technician. The total number of cases is 12: 10 cases in Region 4, 1 in Region 3 and 1 in Region 6. 52 people have been tested thus far.

On 2 April, President David Granger announced the closure of bars, restaurants and other places of entertainment between 18:00 and 06:00.

On 3 April, Guyana had reported 19 cases and 4 deaths, giving the country the world's highest COVID-19 case fatality rate at 21.05%.
The Minister of Health announced that all residents of Guyana would be restricted to their homes/yards. A national curfew would come into effect from 6 PM until 6 AM. The curfew had already been declared on 30 March in Region 10. A limited number of essential services would be operating daily with reduced hours of service.
The Civil Defence Commission (CDC) started a relief program consisting of food and cleaning essentials to the most vulnerable communities.

On 6 April, Guyana had reported 29 cases.

On 8 April, it was announced that Colonel John Lewis, who had died on 7 April, had contracted COVID-19. He had not been tested until after he died. His wife had died from pneumonia 12 days earlier.
All post offices would be closed from that 9 April onward. Arrangements were being made for pensioners to collect pensions.

On 9 April, the European Union announced a grant of €8 million (US$8.6 million), which would be implemented by the Caribbean Public Health Agency, for the fight against the coronavirus. Guyana is one of the 24 members of the CARPHA.
A 6-year-old girl was rushed to the Linden Hospital Complex with serious medical conditions and had been scheduled to be transferred to Georgetown; however, she died within 90 minutes. She would be tested for COVID-19 because she had a fever and trouble breathing, symptoms of the virus. The result of the test was negative.
Volda Lawrence, Public Health Minister, announced that there had been no new cases on 9 April and that a total of 152 people had been tested.

On 11 April, the Civil Defence Commission announced that there were four quarantine facilities with a total capacity of 254.

On 12 April, the Ministry of Health has allowed private hospitals to test for COVID-19.
At least 34 Guyanese had died of COVID-19 in New York City by early April according to the Consulate General of Guyana in New York. Prime Minister Moses Nagamootoo said that 10,000 to 12,000 people were stranded in New York alone, but that at the time no repatriation flights would take place. 200 American citizens were repatriated on 14 April by Eastern Airlines.
Guyana was set to receive 30,000 masks and ventilators from China.

On 15 April, the Ministry of Health announced that of the infected cases, 14 were from the East Coast of Demerara, five from the East Bank of Demerara and 17 within central Georgetown which meant that Region 4 had 86% of all COVID-19 cases.

On 18 April, indigenous villages throughout the regions were concerned about food shortages due to significant increases costs, especially of freight, caused by the pandemic. Up to that time the CDC had not delivered any aid packages due to a reconstruction of their long-term care program.
A seventh death was recorded at the ICU of Georgetown Public Hospital.

On 19 April, PAHO announced 7,000 additional COVID-19 test kits would be sent, adding to the initial 2,000 test kits the country had.

On 21 April, Marvin Pearce, a Guyanese political activist and supporter of APNU+AFC, died on in the United States from COVID-19 at the age of 44.
Suriname and Guyana have agreed to allow legitimate trade over the Courantyne River. The river which forms the border between the countries had been closed, which had resulted in food and fuel shortage in the Amerindian villages, Orealla and Siparuta. The border would remain closed for people.

On 23 April, Guyana dispatched mobile COVID-19 testing units across the country, because there were suspicions that there were more cases due to the limited amount of testing. Guyana had now 9,000 test kits.

On 24 April, Moses Nagamootoo, Chairman of the COVID-19 task force, said that foreign aid had been halted by the irregularities surrounding the 2020 Guyanese general election. Guyana was excluded by the World Bank from the first batch of aid packages. The lack of a budget for 2020 made matters worse.

On 27 April, the Public Health Ministry announced that 464 tests had been performed, an increase of nine tests compared to the day before.

The ninth death to COVID-19 was a 67-year-old man who died at approximately 20:20 on 29 April.

On 30 April, ExxonMobil and its partners donated GY$60 million (~US$290,000) for the fight against COVID-19. Forty million Guyanese dollars would go to the CDC, the Salvation Army, and Rotary Guyana would receive GY$10 million each.

=== May ===
On 6 May 2020, it was disclosed that the tenth death to COVID-19 was tested after the individual died due to complications from the virus. The victim was a 64-year-old man in the Palms Geriatric Home. Twelve staff members and 24 other bedridden persons were quarantined. The number of tests began improving, and up to that time, 714 persons had been tested.
Ten Guyanese were arrested for trying to cross into Brazil illegally and were placed in quarantine. The situation in Brazil with regards to COVID-19 did not deter crossings.

On 10 May, another resident of Palms Geriatric Home tested positive for the virus.

On 11 May, it was reported that an 11-year-old girl, who was one of the first cases, still tested positive after 56 days and had to remain in quarantine.

On 12 May, the virus was now present in seven regions. Region 7 (Cuyuni-Mazaruni) was the newest region. The other regions had been 1 (Barima-Waini), 3 (Essequibo Islands-West Demerara), 4 (Demerara-Mahaica), 6 (East Berbice-Corentyne), 9 (Upper Takutu-Upper Essequibo) and 10 (Upper Demerara-Berbice).
A man who was quarantined with COVID-19 in Lethem escaped and was captured after crossing the closed border Brazil that same day, raising concerns about legalities and his contacts during the escape.

On 20 May, random testing was performed among the Presidential Guard resulted in eight members testing positive for COVID-19.

=== August ===
On 18 August 2020, seventeen were arrested for violating COVID-19 restrictions put in place by police at Montrose bar.

It was announced on 19 August, that President Irfaan Ali would address the nation on the government's response to the COVID-19 pandemic that night, amid a sharp rise of cases. The Ministry of Health (MOH) reported that one other person who tested positive for the novel coronavirus (COVID-19) has died at the Georgetown Public Hospital Corporation (GPHC). The deceased was a 43-year-old woman and a patient of the transitional ward at the GPHC. Upon admission to the GPHC, a swab test was done and following her death, the results came back as positive. Another two other persons who tested positive for the novel coronavirus (COVID-19) have died at the Bartica Hospital (Cuyuni-Mazaruni), Region 7. The patients who died at the hospital were a male and a female, age 55 and 41 respectively. To date, the country has recorded 776 confirmed cases of COVID-19 of which 381 has recovered. There were 29 COVID-19 related deaths.

== Preventive measures ==
- All borders, airports, and ports are closed for passengers
- All schools have been closed
- A curfew has been instituted between 18:00 and 06:00
- All non-essential businesses must close
- All post offices are closed
- Everybody should stay at home except for essential journeys
- Public transport may only carry half the number of passengers they are licensed to carry

== Disputed territory with Venezuela ==
The International Court of Justice planned to discuss Guyana and Venezuela border dispute in March 2020. The hearing was postponed due to the pandemic.

The first hearing was finally carried out on 30 June 2020, but Venezuela did not participate saying that the ICJ lacked jurisdiction. The hearing was held by video conference due to pandemic.

== Notable deaths ==
- John Percy Leon Lewis (13 February 1943 – 7 April 2020), Guyanese military officer and president of the Guyana Rugby Football Union
- Samuel Wilson (c.1942 – 9 September 2020), former toshao (indigenous village chief) of Batavia, Cuyuni-Mazaruni

== Statistics ==
=== New cases per day ===
View source data.

=== Deaths per day ===
View source data.

=== Active cases per day ===
Chronology of the number of active cases

Gaps in data completed using Consulytic Caribbean

== See also ==
- Caribbean Public Health Agency
- COVID-19 pandemic by country
- COVID-19 pandemic in South America
