= Amar Ramadhin =

Surinamese government minister

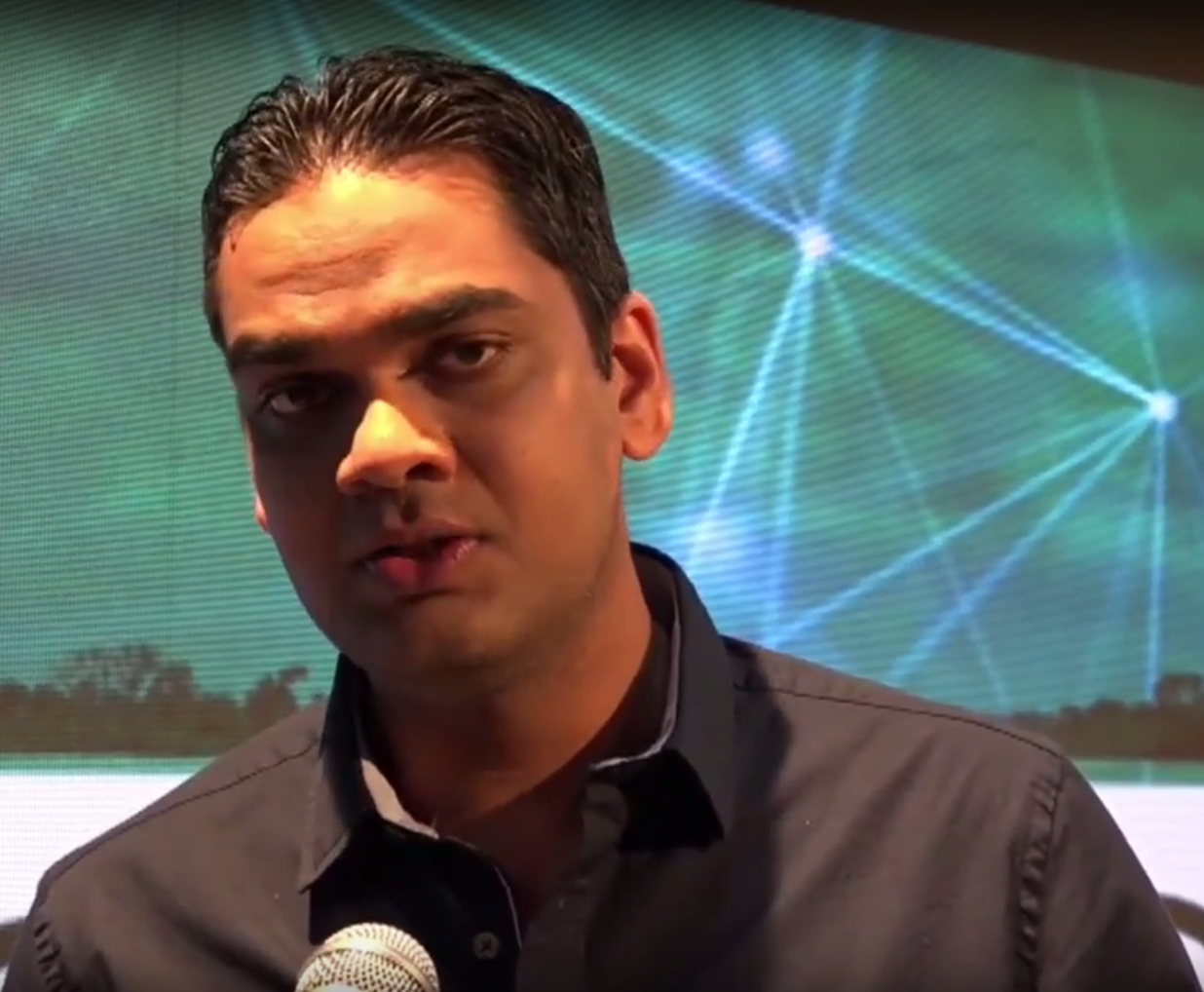
- Ramadhin in 2020

Minister of Public Health
- Incumbent
- Assumed office 16 July 2020
- Preceded by: Antoine Elias

Personal details
- Born: Amar N. Ramadhin Suriname
- Party: Progressive Reform Party (VHP)
- Occupation: physician, politician

Amar N. Ramadhin is a Surinamese physician and as of 2020 Minister of Public Health.

Amar Ramadhin is a general practitioner by profession, and holds a docterandus title. He started teaching at the IBW University in Paramaribo. In 2012, he started at the Medisch Centrum Macdonald in Paramaribo, and until 2020 worked at the General Practitioner Clinic CuraMed in Zorg en Hoop, Paramaribo. He is a member of the medical staff of the Surinamese Football Association, and since 2019, a staff member of the Vereniging van Medici in Suriname (Association of Medical Professionals).

In 1999, Ramadhin became an executive in the Progressive Reform Party (VHP). On 16 July 2020, Ramadhin was appointed Minister of Public Health in the cabinet of Santokhi. On 19 July 2020, Ramadhin was temporarily appointed to head the COVID-19 management team.
