= Hein Eersel =

Surinamese linguist (1922–2022)

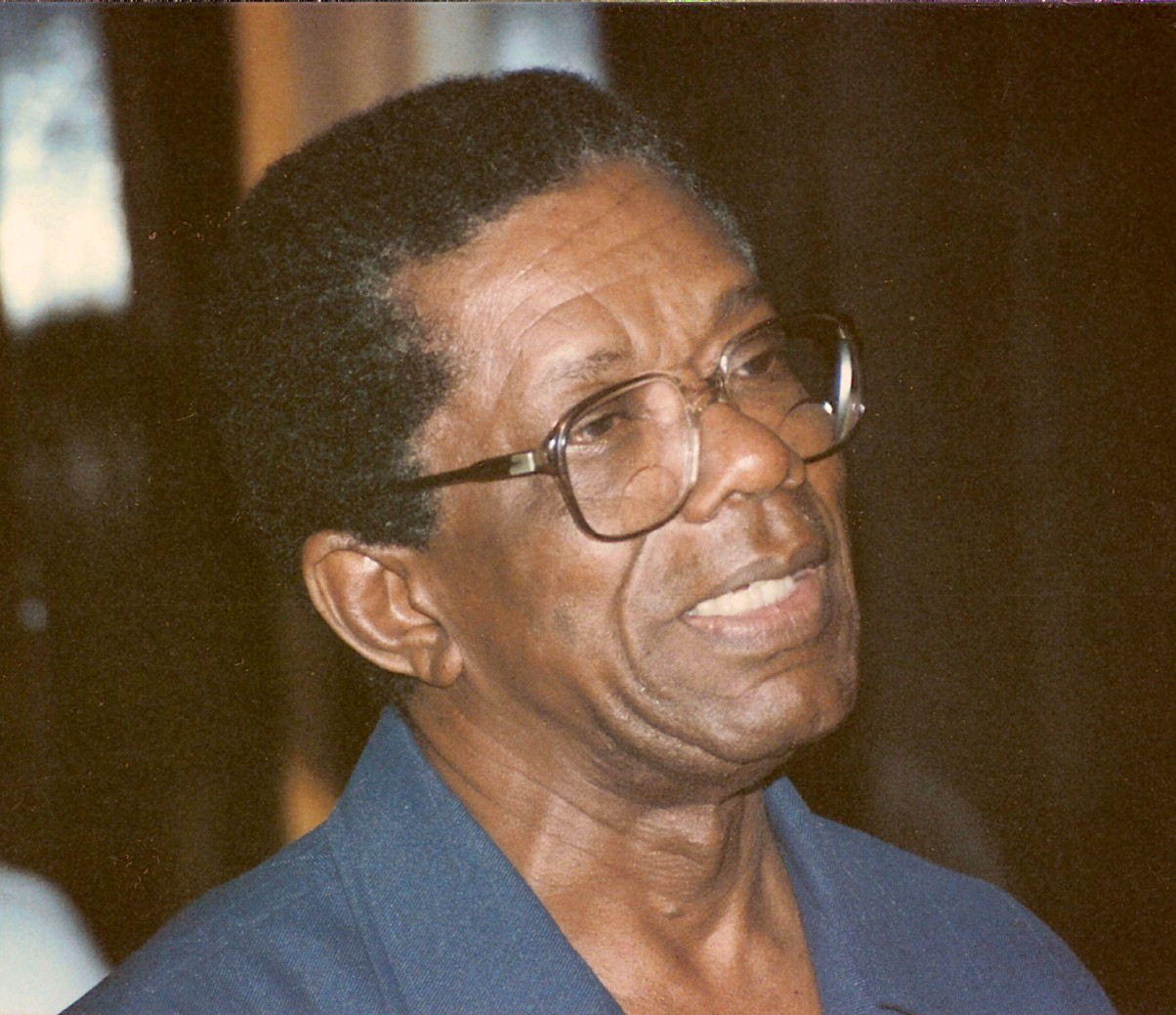
- Eersel in 1986

Minister of Education and Population Development
- In office 5 March 1969 – 20 November 1969
- Prime Minister: Arthur Johan May
- Preceded by: Ewald Meyer
- Succeeded by: Krish Nanan Pandey

Chancellor of the University of Suriname
- In office 1968–1988

Personal details
- Born: Christiaan Hendrik Eersel; 9 June 1922 Paramaribo, Colony of Suriname
- Died: 11 June 2022 (aged 100) Paramaribo, Suriname
- Occupation: Linguist

Christiaan Hendrik "Hein" Eersel (9 June 1922 – 11 June 2022) was a Surinamese linguist and cultural researcher.

He served as Minister of Education and Population Development in the cabinet of acting Prime Minister Arthur Johan May. He was also the first chancellor of the University of Suriname.

== Early life ==
Eersel was born in Paramaribo on 9 June 1922. He passed the assistant teacher certification exam in 1942, and the head teacher certification exam in 1949. In 1950, he traveled to the Netherlands, where he studied Dutch language and literature at the University of Amsterdam. He completed his candidate diploma in 1956, then a doctorandus. While in Amsterdam, he joined the organisation Wie Eegie Sanie (our own things), founded by Surinamese students to promote the Sranan Tongo language and Surinamese culture.

== Career ==
Eersel returned to Suriname in 1959, and began teaching at the Suriname Kweekschool (teacher training college). He later helped to establish the Institute for Teacher Training in Paramaribo. He was director of the Taalbureau (language bureau) and the Bureau Volkslectuur (public literacy bureau) from 1960 to 1969.

In 1968, he became the first chancellor of the University of Suriname, and was also a lecturer in linguistics until his retirement in 1988. He worked with Max Sordam to publish a full dictionary of Sranan Tongo in 1985. After his retirement, he would visit the Netherlands to teach Sranan Tongo classes.

Eersel remained active with the Surinamese creole cultural association NAKS as of 2020, leading the Sranan Grammar Group.

== Personal life ==
Eersel married Florence Louise "Floor" Beck, and they had five children

Eersel died on 11 June 2022, two days after his 100th birthday, in Paramaribo.

== Writing ==
Eersel edited Johanna Schouten-Elsenhout's first published poetry book, Tide ete (1963).

Eersel wrote a stage adaptation of Beaumarchais' The Barber of Seville, which opened at the Thalia Theatre in Paramaribo in 1960. While Noni Lichtveld's costumes and staging kept the original setting in 18th-century Spain, Eersel adapted some of the jokes and figures of speech for the local audience. A newspaper review noted that Eersel "put a few genuine Surinamese expressions in the mouth of our barber".

The Nijmegen Institute for Missiology published a festschrift for Eersel's 80th birthday. Eersel was an active member of the Catholic Church in Suriname and in the Netherlands, and he had previously researched the history of Bible translations into Sranan Tongo.

== Honours ==
Eersel received an honorary doctorate from the Faculty of Social Sciences at the University of Suriname in 2003. He also received the Gazon Matodya Award, conferred by the Maroon-focused Sabanapenti Foundation, in 2009. In 2013, he was made a Grand Officer of the Honorary Order of the Palm.

At the suggestion of the Henri Frans de Ziel Foundation, the Gemenelandsweg street in Paramaribo was renamed in Eersel's honour after a 2019 extension.

On his 100th birthday, minister Marie Levens of Education, Science and Culture announced the foundation of the Hein Eersel Institute. The Institute's focus will be developing professional approaches to multilingual education in Suriname.

== Partial bibliography ==
=== Books ===
- Sordam, Max; Eersel, Ch.H. (1985). Sranantongo = Surinaamse taal : een korte inleiding tot het Sranantong[o], met uitgebreide woordenlijst (1st ed.). Baarn: Bosch & Keuning. ISBN 90-246-4495-X. OCLC 781709778.

=== Articles ===
- Eersel, Christian (1971). "Varieties of Creole in Suriname: Prestige in Choice of Language and Linguistic Form". In Hymes, Dell (ed.). Pidginization and Creolization of Languages. Cambridge University Press. pp. 317–322.
- Eersel, Ch.H. (1991). "Bijbelvertalingen in het Sranan". OSO. 10: 48–56.
- Libi naga bribi : enkele aanzetten tot Surinaamse theologie : feestbundel ter ere van Hein Eersel, Nijmegen, Nijmeegs Instituut voor Missiologie, 2002.

=== Pamphlets ===
- Eersel, Hein (1964). Wie is Surinamer? (in Dutch). Paramaribo: Drukkerij Lionarons. OCLC 10116838.
