= École Socrates-Démosthène =

Socrates-Demosthenes School
- École Socrates-Démosthène; Σχολείο Σωκράτης-Δημοσθένης
- Greater Montreal, Quebec; Canada

Information
- School type: private
- Motto: French: Découvrez Votre Héritage...Préparez Votre Avenir (Discover Your Heritage...Prepare Your Future)
- Founded: 1909
- Principal: Chris Adamopoulos
- Grades: Pre-Kindergarten to Grade 6
- Enrollment: 1 300
- Language: French, English, Greek
- Campuses: Socrates II : Montreal, Socrates III: Roxboro; Socrates IV : South-Shore; Socrates V : Laval; Demosthenes : Laval
- Colours: Navy; Blue; White
- Website: www.socdem.org

Socrates-Demosthenes School (École Socrates-Démosthene) (Σχολείο Σωκράτης-Δημοσθένης) is a private elementary school locarted in Greater Montreal, Quebec, Canada. Founded in 1909, the school offers a trilingual program (French, Greek, and English), and mainly serves the Hellenic Community of Greater Montreal.

== Campuses ==
=== Socrates II, Montreal ===
In 1982, the community bought a new lot of land to build a new community center. This community center was also planned to have a school. This would later on be established as the 2nd campus of the Socrates schools. This building has a cathedral, a library, a reception hall, a gym, 27 classrooms (including a daycare center "Ta Paidakia"), and many administrative offices. Today, 250 students attend the school.

=== Socrates III, Roxboro ===
In 1982, a new building is built in Roxboro to attend to its Greek student population. This building consists of 29 classrooms (including a daycare center), a library, a gym, and many administrative offices. Today, more than 200 students attend this school.

=== Socrates IV, St-Hubert ===
In 1985, the H.C.M. agreed to build not only an elementary school (which would be the 4th campus built by the community) but also a community center that would be able to serve the full population of the South-Shore region. The building has a church, 18 classrooms (including a daycare center), a multimedia room, a library, a cafeteria, a gym, and many administrative offices. Today, the school consists of about 100 students.

=== Socrates V, Laval ===
In 1990, the H.C.M. bought a new building to serve to the students of the Laval community. This building consists of 23 classrooms, a gym, a library, and some administrative offices. Even though it is the smallest building in all the H.C.G.M (besides its annex bought in 2002 to attend a daycare and the kindergarten groups of the 5th campus) it has the largest number of students, consisting of about 500 students.

=== Demosthenes, Laval ===
In 2011, the H.C.M. bought the Hellenic community of Laval along with all its organizations. One of the biggest interests of the H.C.M. was their elementary school, Demosthenes. Today, this school has more than 200 students. It is the newest addition to the community's schools.
