= Antoine Joly =

French politician

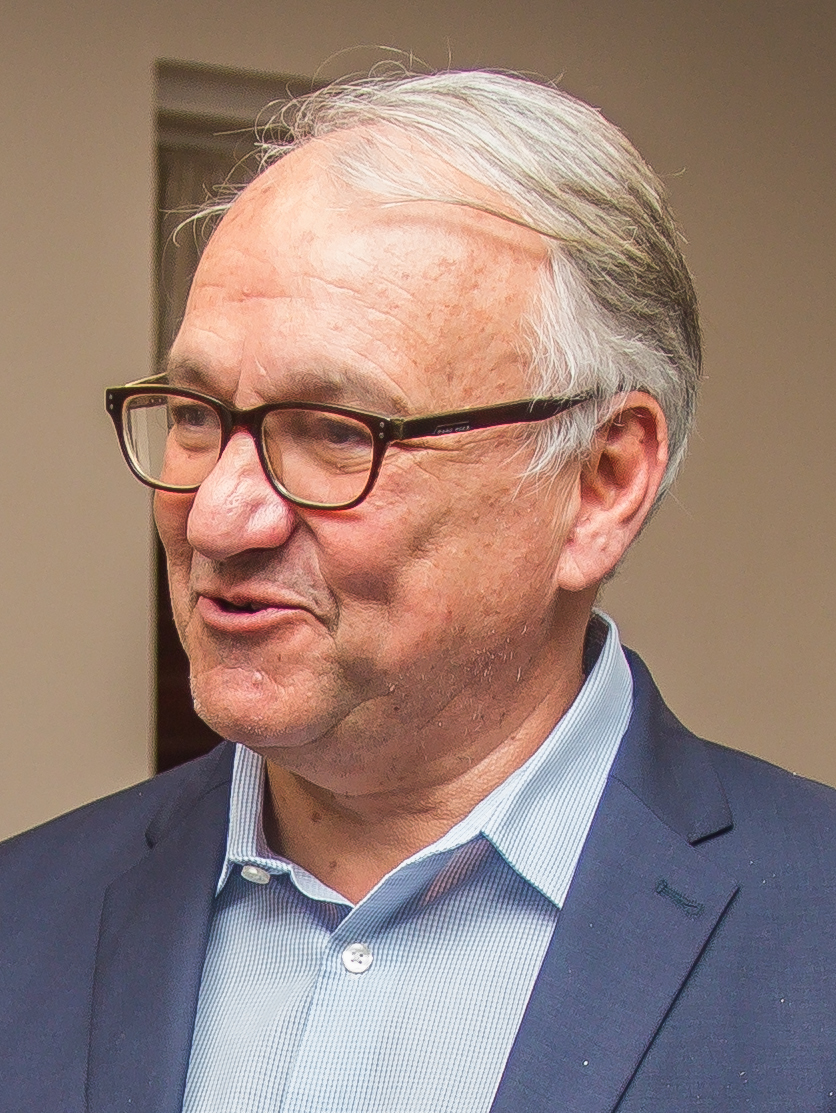

French Ambassador to Suriname
- In office 17 January 2017 – 8 September 2021
- Preceded by: Michel Prom
- Succeeded by: Pierre Lanapats

French Ambassador to Nicaragua
- In office 15 July 2011 – August 2015

Personal details
- Born: 16 July 1955 (age 70) Le Mans, France
- Party: RPR

Antoine Joly (16 July 1955) is a French politician who served as ambassador to Suriname, CARICOM and Guyana from 2017 until 2021.

== Biography ==
Joly was born in Le Mans, and graduated from Sciences Po. He started his career for the City of Paris and in 1981 became the head of the Tax and Economic Office. From 28 March 1993 until 21 April 1997, Joly was the deputy for Sarthe's 3rd constituency in the National Assembly. His party affiliation is RPR. From 15 July 2011 until August 2015 he served as French ambassador to Nicaragua.

On 17 January 2017 Joly was appointed as the French ambassador to Suriname as well the ambassador for French Guiana to the CARICOM, and non-resident ambassador to Guyana.

On 24 March 2020, Joly became the eighth case of COVID-19 in Suriname. Joly got infected when he was in a small waiting room of Zorg en Hoop Airport together with a Dutch person who was later diagnosed positive in the Netherlands. Joly was first treated at the Wanica Hospital in Lelydorp. Joly only had mild symptoms, therefore he was transported to Cayenne in French Guiana on 29 March 2020, where he was quarantined. On 7 April 2020 Joly recovered from COVID-19. On 8 April 2020, Joly returned to Suriname to resume his duties.

On 8 September 2021, Joly retired and was succeeded by Pierre Lanapats. During his tenure, he established the first joint police post, judicial cooperation, and helped pass a border protocol. Joly expressed his regrets that he was not able to resolve the 1891 border dispute. On 6 October 2021, he was awarded the Grand Cordon of the Honorary Order of the Palm by President Santokhi.
