= 2005 Surinamese general election =

- 25 May 2005
- 51 seats in the National Assembly; 26 seats needed for a majority
- Turnout: 65.93% (▼6.10pp)
Party	Leader	Vote %	Seats	+/–
NFDO	Ronald Venetiaan	41.08	23	−10
NDP	Desire Bouterse	23.16	15	+8
VVV	Jules Wijdenbosch	14.38	5	New
AC	Ronnie Brunswijk	7.52	5	New
A1	Winston Jessurun	6.11	3	New
This lists parties that won seats. See the complete results below.
Results by district
Chairman of the National Assembly before	Chairman of the National Assembly after
Ram Sardjoe; VHP	Paul Somohardjo; Pertjajah Luhur

General elections were held in Suriname on 25 May 2005. The governing New Front for Democracy and Development of president Ronald Venetiaan lost seats, remaining the largest party but failing to get a majority in the National Assembly of Suriname. Despite this Venetiaan was re-elected as president after obtaining sufficient support to win a majority in the election for president.

== Background ==
Suriname became independent from the Netherlands in 1975 and in 1980 a coup brought the military to power. By 1982 Desi Bouterse had become head of state and remained in effective control of Suriname until international pressure led to a return to democracy in 1991. The 1991 elections saw the opposition New Front for Democracy and Development win the election and Ronald Venetiaan became president for the first time.

In the 1996 elections Venetiaan and the New Front were defeated by National Democratic Party (NDP) led by a former aide to Bouterse, Jules Wijdenbosch. However soaring inflation meant a new election was called one year early in 2000. The New Front won a big victory in the 2000 elections winning 33 of the 51 seats, compared to 7 for the NDP, and 5 for the People's Alliance for Progress of Jules Wijdenbosch who had broken away from the NDP. As a result, Venetiaan became president for a second time.

== Campaign ==
383 candidates spread over ten parties and alliances contested the election, with opinion polls and political analysts in the run up to the election showing that approximately 30% of voters were unsure of whom to vote for. The governing New Front was expected to lose seats in the election despite incumbent Ronald Venetiaan being seen as the most popular candidate for president. The New Front campaigned on their economic record for the previous five years in power.

Both the Netherlands, the former colonial ruler of Suriname, and the United States said that relations with Suriname would suffer if the main opposition party, the National Democratic Party, led by Desi Bouterse came back to power. Bouterse had been convicted in the Netherlands for drug smuggling and was accused of involvement in the killing of 15 people in 1982 when he was the military ruler of Suriname. Bouterse, however denied the charges and accused the United States of interfering in the election. Bouterse was popular among many poorer and young voters who had not benefited from the economic changes made by Ronald Venetiaan's government. His campaign slogan was "Des for Pres".

Two parties of international election monitors from the Organization of American States (OAS) and the Caribbean Community (CARICOM) were sent to observe the election. The observers from CARICOM congratulated Suriname on the conduct of the election and described the behaviour of the people of Suriname as an example for the Caribbean. The OAS observers also described the election as having been peaceful and having taken place in a friendly atmosphere.

== Results ==
No party or alliance won a majority of the seats in the election and none came close to getting the two-thirds of seats required to elect a new president. The New Front for Democracy and Development won 23 seats, a drop of 10 from the previous parliament, while the opposition National Democratic Party more than doubled their number of seats to 15. There was surprise at the performance of the new A-Combination alliance which won 5 seats, the same number as the People's Alliance for Progress of former president Jules Wijdenbosch. Two political parties made allegations of fraud in the election but the Independent Election Authority did not find them to be justified.

Party	Votes	%	Seats
New Front for Democracy and Development	86,690	41.08	23
National Democratic Party	48,879	23.16	15
People's Alliance for Progress	30,352	14.38	5
A-Combination	15,867	7.52	5
A1 (DA'91–D21E–PVFAL–T2000)	12,901	6.11	3
UPS–DOE	10,293	4.88	0
New Suriname	3,460	1.64	0
Progressive Workers' and Farmers' Union	1,958	0.93	0
Progressive Political Party	370	0.18	0
National Union	272	0.13	0
Total	211,042	100.00	51
Valid votes	211,042	95.85	
Invalid/blank votes	9,139	4.15	
Total votes	220,181	100.00	
Registered voters/turnout	333,985	65.93	
Source: Caribbean Elections, Centraal HoofdStembureau, PDBA

== Aftermath ==
Following the election the National Assembly had two months to elect a president who would then appoint a government. The New Front party reached an agreement at the beginning of June to bring the A Combination alliance into government giving them a majority in parliament but still short of the two-thirds required to elect a president. The leader of the National Democratic Party, Bouterse, did not stand in the presidential election after reaching an agreement with the People's Alliance for Progress to back Rabin Parmessar.

In the first two rounds of the presidential election 27 members of the parliament voted for the New Front candidate, incumbent president Ronald Venetiaan, while 20 voted for Rabin Parmessar. As neither candidate received a two-thirds majority, the election was taken to the People’s Assembly. In the People’s Assembly, which was composed of members of parliament, provincial and district councils, a simple majority was required to be elected president. In the election on 3 August 2005 Venetiaan won 560 votes as against 315 for Parmessar and so was re-elected as president of Suriname.
