= 1996 Surinamese general election =

- 23 May 1996
- 51 seats in the National Assembly; 26 seats needed for a majority
- Turnout: 66.66% (▼2.64pp)
Party	Leader	Vote %	Seats	+/–
NFDO	Ronald Venetiaan	41.78	24	−6
NDP	Jules Wijdenbosch	26.21	16	+4
DA'91	Winston Jessurun	13.00	4	−3
PL	Paul Somohardjo	9.25	4	+2
HPP–PVF–PSV		8.40	3	+3
This lists parties that won seats. See the complete results below.
Results by district
Chairman of the National Assembly before	Chairman of the National Assembly after
Jagernath Lachmon; VHP	Marijke Djwalapersad; BVD

General elections were held in Suriname on 23 May 1996. The result was a victory for the New Front for Democracy and Development (an alliance of the National Party of Suriname, the Progressive Reform Party, the Party for National Unity and Solidarity and the Surinamese Labour Party), which won 24 of the 51 seats. Voter turnout was 67%.

== Results ==
Party	Votes	%	Seats	+/–
New Front for Democracy and Development	72,480	41.78	24	–6
National Democratic Party	45,466	26.21	16	+4
Democratic Alternative '91	22,548	13.00	4	–3
Pendawa Lima	16,040	9.25	4	+2
Progressive Development Alliance (HPP–PVF–PSV)	14,578	8.40	3	+3
General Liberation and Development Party	2,360	1.36	0	0
Total	173,472	100.00	51	0
Valid votes	173,472	96.69		
Invalid/blank votes	5,944	3.31		
Total votes	179,416	100.00		
Registered voters/turnout	269,165	66.66		
Source: Nohlen, Centraal HoofdStembureau
