= Caprino Alendy =

Surinamese politician (1952–2020)

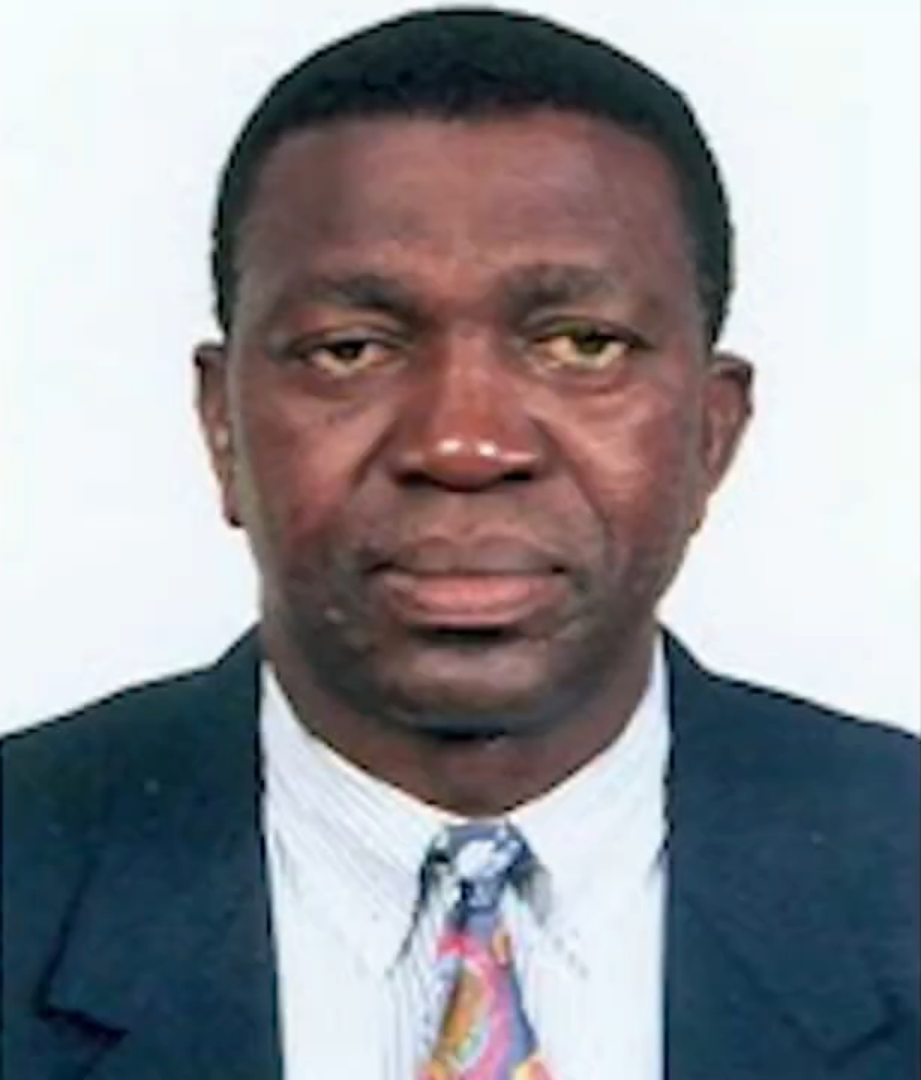

Chairperson of Brotherhood and Unity in Politics
- In office 1987–2012
- Preceded by: Eugene Pryor
- Succeeded by: Celsius Waterberg

Vice Chairperson of the National Assembly
- In office 2005–2010
- Preceded by: Ruth Wijdenbosch
- Succeeded by: Ruth Wijdenbosch

Personal details
- Born: 24 October 1952 Benanoe, Sipaliwini, Surinam
- Died: 6 November 2020 (aged 68) Suriname
- Party: Brotherhood and Unity in Politics (BEP)
- Occupation: Teacher, politician

Caprino Alendy (24 October 1952 – 6 November 2020) was a Surinamese politician and chairperson of Brotherhood and Unity in Politics (BEP) from 1987 until 2012. Alendy was vice chairperson of the National Assembly between 2005 and 2010.

== Biography ==
Alendy was born on 24 October 1952 in Benanoe, Sipaliwini. He was a teacher by profession and was the president of the Mulo (junior high school) in Latour, Paramaribo.

In 1977, Alendy joined the Brotherhood and Unity in Politics, and was elected chairperson in 1987. That year, the party did not participate in the elections, because the Surinamese Interior War made it difficult to access their members in the interior. In 1991, BEP participated in the elections as part of the Democratic Alternative '91, and Alendy was elected to the National Assembly. In 2005, he was elected vice chairperson of the National Assembly, and served until 2010.

In 2012, there was an internal struggle within the party. It was part of the A-Combination, a union of all Maroon parties, but wanted to leave the alliance. Deputies Diana Pokie and Waldie Adjaiso opposed the suggestion, causing a split within the party. In April 2012, BEP refused to support the Amnesty Law which would grant immunity to the suspects in the December Murders, including Dési Bouterse. In May 2012, the two ministers of the BEP were dismissed by Bouterse. On 29 September 2012, Alendy stepped down as chairperson, and Celsius Waterberg was elected as his replacement. Alendy was later awarded the honorary presidency of the BEP.

On 6 November 2020, Alendy died from COVID-19 at the age of 68.
