= Surinamese Labour Party =

Political party in Suriname

Surinamese Labour Party Surinaamse Partij van de Arbeid
- Abbreviation: SPA
- Leader: Guno Castelen
- Founder: Fred Derby
- Founded: 1 July 1987
- Preceded by: Nationalist Republican Party
- Ideology: Social democracy Labourism
- Political position: Centre-left
- National affiliation: V7 (2015); New Front for Democracy and Development (formerly)
- Seats in the National Assembly: 0 / 51

The Surinamese Labour Party (Dutch: Surinaamse Partij van de Arbeid, SPA) is a political party in Suriname.

In the 2010 legislative elections, the party was part of the New Front for Democracy and Development that won 31.65% of the popular vote and 14 out of 51 seats in the National Assembly. The SPA got one seat out of these 14.

In the 2020 elections, the SPA again won no seats. It contested in only 9 of the districts, and decided against running in Coronie.

| 2020 | Votes | % |
|---|---|---|
| Paramaribo | 363 | 0,31 |
| Wanica | 198 | 0,28 |
| Sipaliwini | 152 | 1,43 |
| Para | 85 | 0,67 |
| Brokopondo | 32 | 0,60 |
| Commewijne | 31 | 0,16 |
| Nickerie | 30 | 0,15 |
| Saramacca | 17 | 0,16 |
| Marowijne | 14 | 0,16 |
| Total | 922 | 0,34 |

== Electoral results ==
| Election | Leader | Seats | Votes | % | +/– | Government |
|---|---|---|---|---|---|---|
| 1987 | Fred Derby | 0 / 51 | 2,704 | 1.57 | New | Extra-parliamentary |
| 1991 | Fred Derby | 3 / 51 | | | ▲3 | Coalition |
| 1996 | Fred Derby | 1 / 51 | | | ▼2 | Opposition |
| 2000 | Fred Derby | 4 / 51 | | | ▲3 | Coalition |
| 2005 | Siegfried Gilds | 2 / 51 | | | ▼2 | Coalition |
| 2010 | Guno Castelen | 1 / 51 | | | ▼1 | Opposition |
| 2015 | Guno Castelen | 0 / 51 | 719 | | ▼1 | Extra-parliamentary |
| 2020 | Guno Castelen | 0 / 51 | 922 | 0.34 | 0 | Extra-parliamentary |

== Representation ==
=== Members of the First Venetiaan Cabinet (1991–1996) ===
| Ministers | Party | Ministry |
|---|---|---|
| Reynold Simons | SPA | Labour |
| Jack Kross | SPA | Labour |
| Siegfried Gilds | SPA | Defense |
| John Defares | SPA | Transport, Communication and Tourism |

=== Members of the Second Venetiaan Cabinet (2000–2005) ===
| Ministers | Party | Ministry |
|---|---|---|
| Clifford Marica | SPA | Labour |
| Siegfried Gilds | SPA | Justice and Police |
| Guno Castelen | SPA | Transport, Communication and Tourism |

=== Members of the Third Venetiaan Cabinet (2005–2010) ===
| Ministers | Party | Ministry |
|---|---|---|
| Clifford Marica | SPA | Labour |
| Siegfried Gilds | SPA | Trade and Industry |
| Clifford Marica | SPA | Trade and Industry |

== Chairmen ==
- Fred Derby: 1987–2001
- Siegfried Gilds: 2001–2009
- Guno Castelen: 2009–incumbent
