= Ingrid Karta-Bink =

Surinamese politician

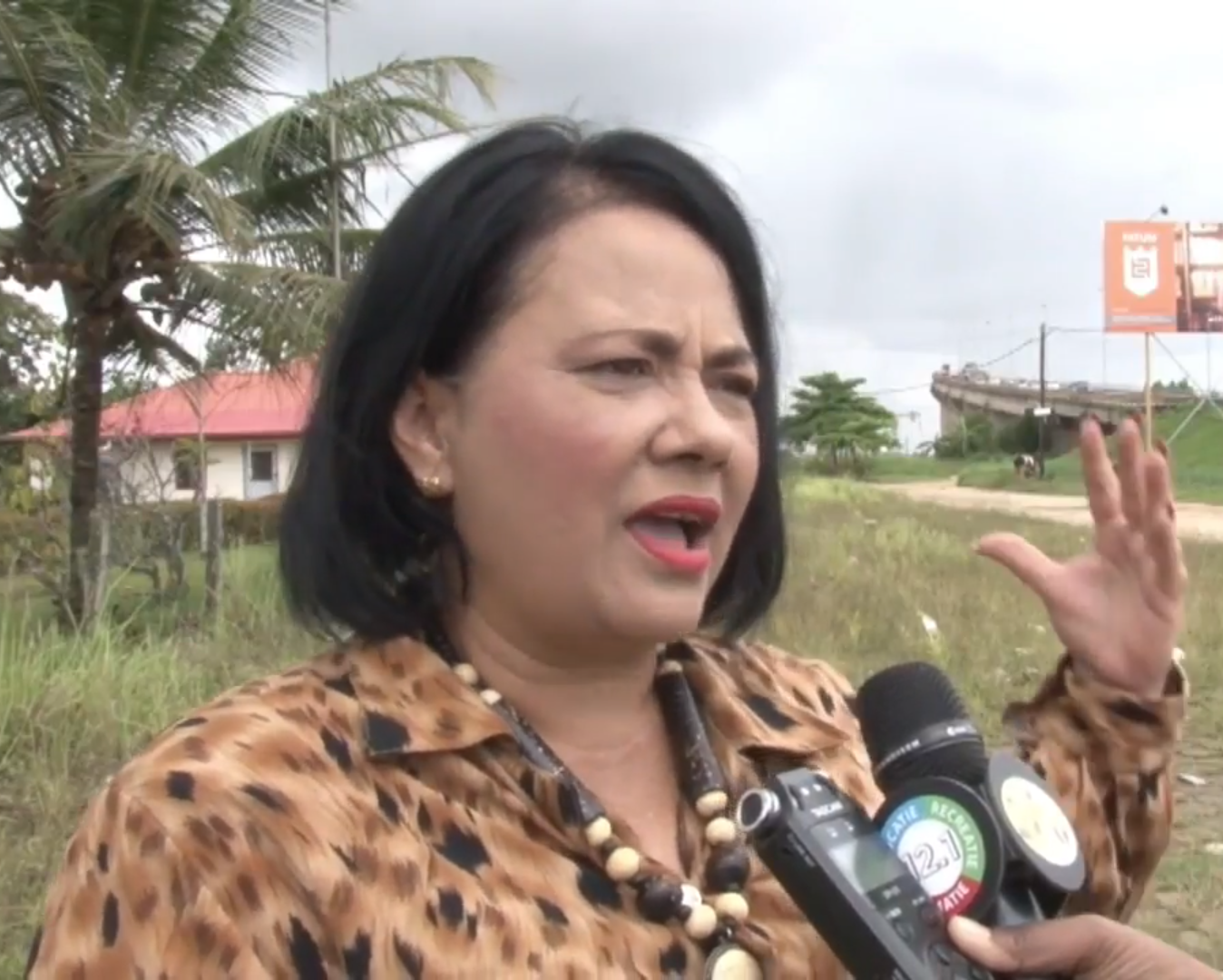
- in 2018

Member of the National Assembly
- In office 2005–2020
- Constituency: Commewijne District

Personal details
- Born: c. 1972 Commewijne District
- Party: Pertjajah Luhur (until 2020)
- Occupation: school principal, politician

Ingrid Karta-Bink or Ingrid Bink (born 1972) is a Surinamese school principal who became a politician. She was a member of the National Assembly of Suriname.

== Life ==
Karta-Bink was born in Commewijne District in about 1972. She had a good childhood and she was the fourth of five children. She took advantage of other cultures and learned some Hindustani.

She served as school principal at OS Mariënburg for a decade after teaching for five years.

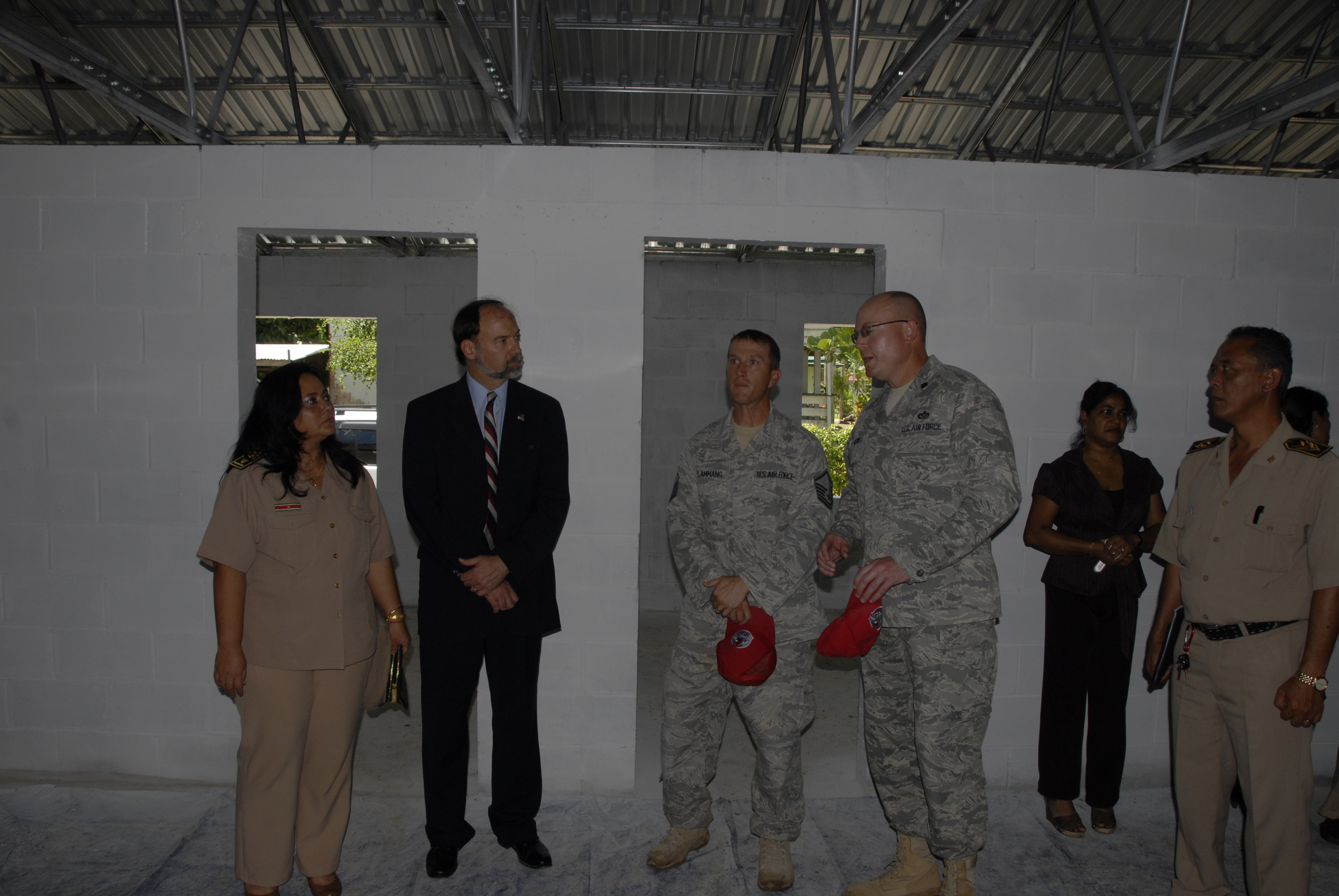
Karta-Bink as District Commissioner in 2011 with the US Ambassador John Nay

She began her interest in the Pertjajah Luhur party and this was not an easy route. The party had some male chauvinism and it was only by combining with other strong women that she was able to oppose this discrimination. The party now has a strong leader and the chauvinists have left the party.

On 18 June 2011 she was given the political appointment of District Commissioner as part of the decentralisation. She was happy with her team, but surprised to find that their educational attainment was low. Only one member of her team had a graduate degree and some had not completed primary education.

In 2015 she was elected to the National Assembly. In 2020 she stood again emphasising that the country should tighten up on the conditions it set people who wanted to be Suriname nationals. She wanted to test candidates in their knowledge of the Dutch language, and required knowledge of the national anthem. She believed that the country would vote a coalition of parties into power and they did not want a single party to hold power. There were four people elected from Commewijne District and she was not one of the two elected from her party.

Karta-Bink resigned from the Pertjajah Luhur party in September 2020 after consulting her family. She had been serving as a chairperson of her part of the party.
