= Democratic National Platform 2000 =

Political party in Suriname

The Democratic National Platform 2000 (Dutch: Democratisch Nationaal Platform 2000) was a political party in Suriname, that was founded and led by Jules Wijdenbosch, formerly of the NDP. At the legislative elections (25 May 2005), the DNP 2000 was part of the People's Alliance for Progress that won over 14.5% of the popular vote and five out of 51 seats in the National Assembly. The party was dissolved in 2009, with most of its members returning to the NDP.

| Election | Seats | +/– | Votes | % | Government |
|---|---|---|---|---|---|
| 2000 | 2 / 51 | ▲3 | 18,154 | 9.93 | Opposition |
| 2005 | 3 / 51 | ▲1 | 30,352 | 14.38 | Opposition |
