= Harry Kisoensingh =

Harry Kisoensingh (22 September 1954 in Nickerie District, Suriname – 27 April 2008), was chairman of the Union of Progressive Surinamese and was a Surinamese educator.

In 1973, Kisoensingh was one of the found members of the Renewed Progressive Party (HPP). In 1991, he was first elected to the National Assembly of Suriname. He served as vice Chairman of the National Assembly of Suriname from 1996 to 2000, while being in the opposition.

On 30 May 1999, he was re-elected to the chairmanship of the HPP. The HPP became part of the Union of Progressive Surinamese in 2004.

== Uncovered scandals ==
He uncovered several political scandals:

- Illegal sand and clay digging activities at plantation Waterloo
- Illegal transactions at Staatsolie
