= Democrats of the 21st Century =

- Leader: Soewarto Moestadja
- Founded: 12 March 2000
- Dissolved: 16 March 2010
- Headquarters: Paramaribo

Democrats of the 21st Century (Dutch: Democraten van de 21ste eeuw) was a political party in Suriname from 2000 to 2010. The party originally broke away from the Party for National Unity and Solidarity, and eventually merged into the Pertjajah Luhur. Its leader was Soewarto Moestadja.

== History ==
The party was founded at the end of the presidency of Jules Wijdenbosch (1996–2000). Due to disagreements between Wijdenbosch and fellow National Democratic Party leader Desi Bouterse, the NDP withdrew its support for Wijdenbosch's government and decided to contest 2000 elections separately.

The Party for National Unity and Solidarity, which held five ministries as part of the ruling coalition, decided to follow the NDP. However, three of its ministers (including Soewarto Moestadja) decided to support Wijdenbosch; they broke from the party and founded Democrats of the 21st Century (D21). The new party did not win any seats in the 2000 election.

Five years later, D21 joined the A1-Combination, a coalition that also included Democratic Alternative '91, the Political Wing of the FAL and Meeting Point 2000. This coalition won three seats in total, with none from D21. D21 left the coalition in 2008.

D21 formally merged with the Pertjajah Luhur on 16 March 2010.
