= Dew Sharman =

Surinamese doctor and politician

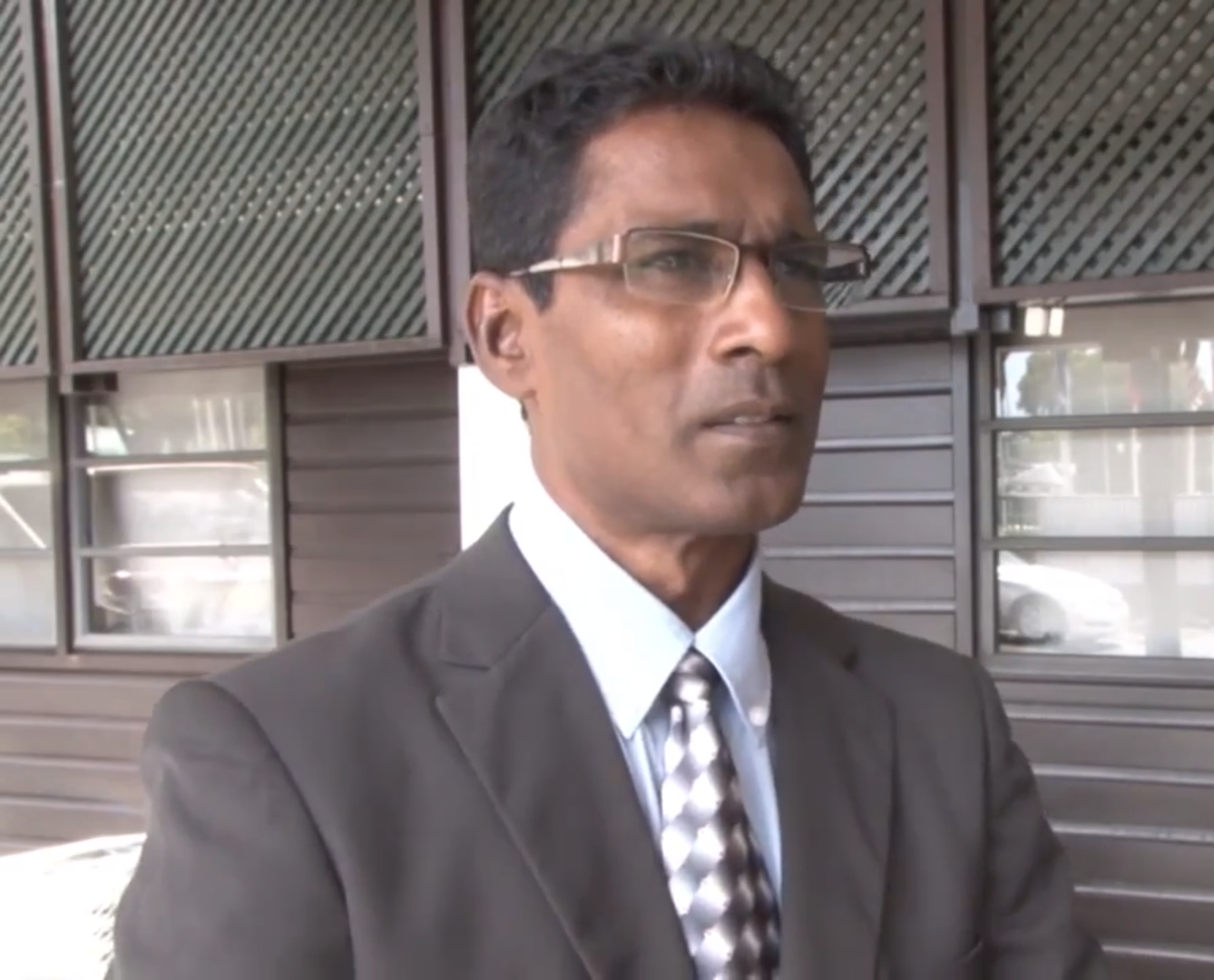
- Dew Sharman (2017)

Vice Chairperson of the National Assembly of Suriname
- In office 29 June 2020 – 28 June 2025
- Preceded by: Ruth Wijdenbosch
- Succeeded by: Ronnie Brunswijk

Member of the National Assembly
- Incumbent
- Assumed office 2015
- Constituency: Paramaribo District

Personal details
- Born: Dewanchandrebhose Sharman; 20 February 1965 (age 61) Paradise, Nickerie, Suriname
- Party: Progressive Reform Party (VHP)

Dewanchandrebhose Sharman (20 February 1965) is a Surinamese doctor and politician. He is a member of the National Assembly for the Progressive Reform Party (VHP). In 2015, he was first elected to the National Assembly by preferential votes. In 2020, Sharman was elected Vice Chairman of the National Assembly in an uncontested election.

== Biography ==
Sharman was born on 20 February 1965 in the rural village of Paradise, Suriname. After graduating from high school, he went to the boarding school Zaailand Internaat in Paramaribo, and graduated from the Anton de Kom University as a medical doctor at the primary health level. Sharman started to work at the Regional Health Service (RGD).

Sharman first tried to run for National Assembly for the VHP in the 2010 elections, however the VHP campaign was based on a vote for the main candidate, and he did not receive enough votes. Sharman tried again in the 2015 elections, and campaigned for direct votes. He was elected with 12,217 votes, the second highest number of votes for a single candidate in Paramaribo after Desi Bouterse.

== 2020 Elections ==
During the 2020 elections Sharman was re-elected. On 29 June 2020, Sharman was nominated for Vice Chairman of the National Assembly, and was elected in an uncontested election. Ronnie Brunswijk was elected Chairman. On 6 July, Gregory Rusland was elected as first replacement. Harriët Ramdien and Soerjani Mingoen-Karijomenawi will be second and third replacements respectively. On 14 July 2020, Marinus Bee succeeded Ronnie Brunswijk as Chairman.
