= Doekhi =

Doekhi is a surname. Notable people with the surname include:

- Danilho Doekhi (born 1998), Dutch footballer
- Rashied Doekhi (born 1955), Surinamese politician
