= Union of Progressive Surinamese =

Political party in Suriname

The Union of Progressive Surinamese (Dutch: Unie van Progressieve Surinamers) was a political party in Suriname. It was founded in 2003 by Henry Ori, who was the party's chairman during its whole existence. At the 2005 Surinamese general election, in an alliance with the Party for Democracy and Development through Unity, the party won 4.9% of the popular vote and no seats in the National Assembly. During the 2010 elections, the union was one of the four parties in the People's Alliance (VolksAlliantie) before the elections), in which Paul Somohardjo's Pertjajah Luhur (PL) participated as the largest party, where it again failed to secure a seat. In 2013, the party under Ori merged into the Progressive Reform Party (VHP).
