= Guno =

Guno may refer to:

== People ==
- Guno Berenstein (born 1967), Dutch judoka
- Guno Castelen, Surinamese politician
- Guno Hoen (1922–2010), Surinamese football player and sports journalist
- Guno Kwasie (born 1985), Surinamese football player
- Larry Guno (1940–2005), Canadian celebrity

== Places ==
- Guno, Indonesia
