= 2000 Surinamese general election =

- 25 May 2000
- 51 seats in the National Assembly; 26 seats needed for a majority
- Turnout: 72.03% (▲5.37pp)
Party	Leader	Vote %	Seats	+/–
NFDO	Ronald Venetiaan	47.49	33	+14
DA–KTPI–NDP	Desi Bouterse	15.04	10	−11
DNP 2000	Jules Wijdenbosch	9.93	3	New
DA'91	Winston Jessurun	6.12	2	−2
PV FAL	Jiwan Sital	4.47	2	+1
PALU	Iwan Krolis	0.71	1	New
This lists parties that won seats. See the complete results below.
Results by district
Chairman of the National Assembly before	Chairman of the National Assembly after
Marijke Djwalapersad; BVD	Jagernath Lachmon; VHP

General elections were held in Suriname on 25 May 2000. The result was a victory for the New Front for Democracy and Development, which won 33 of the 51 seats. Voter turnout was 72%.

== Results ==
Party	Votes	%	Seats	+/–
New Front for Democracy and Development	86,803	47.49	33	+14
Millennium Combination (DA–KTPI–NDP)	27,481	15.04	10	–11
Democratic National Platform 2000	18,154	9.93	3	New
Democratic Alternative '91	11,183	6.12	2	–2
Political Wing of the FAL	8,173	4.47	2	+1
Basic Party for Renewal and Democracy	5,865	3.21	0	New
Democracy and Development through Unity	4,561	2.50	0	New
Renewed Progressive Party	4,510	2.47	0	–
New Choice	4,361	2.39	0	New
General Liberation and Development Party	3,160	1.73	0	0
Democrats of the 21st Century	2,323	1.27	0	New
National Party for Leadership and Development	1,893	1.04	0	New
Pendawa Lima	1,432	0.78	0	–4
Progressive Workers' and Farmers' Union	1,290	0.71	1	New
National Reformation Party	790	0.43	0	New
Amazon Party Suriname	608	0.33	0	New
Progressive Surinamese People's Party	186	0.10	0	–
Total	182,773	100.00	51	0
Valid votes	182,773	95.77		
Invalid/blank votes	8,068	4.23		
Total votes	190,841	100.00		
Registered voters/turnout	264,942	72.03		
Source: Nohlen, Centraal HoofdStembureau
