= Congress Hall (disambiguation) =

Congress Hall may refer to:

- Congress Hall, a former United States capitol building
- Congress Hall (Cape May hotel), a historic hotel in Cape May, Cape May County, New Jersey, United States
- Congress Hall (Paramaribo), a convention and exhibition centre in Paramaribo, Suriname
- Congress Hall, Ufa, a Government House in Ufa, Bashkortostan, Russia
- Congress Hall (Warsaw), a theatre at the Palace of Culture and Science in Warsaw, Poland
- April 25 House of Culture, a theatre located in Pyongyang, North Korea, sometimes referred to as Congress Hall
- Congress Hall (San Diego, California), Pony Express Station from 1860 to 1861
- Riga Congress Hall (Riga Congress Center), a convention and music venue in Riga, Latvia
