= Winston Jessurun =

Surinamese politician

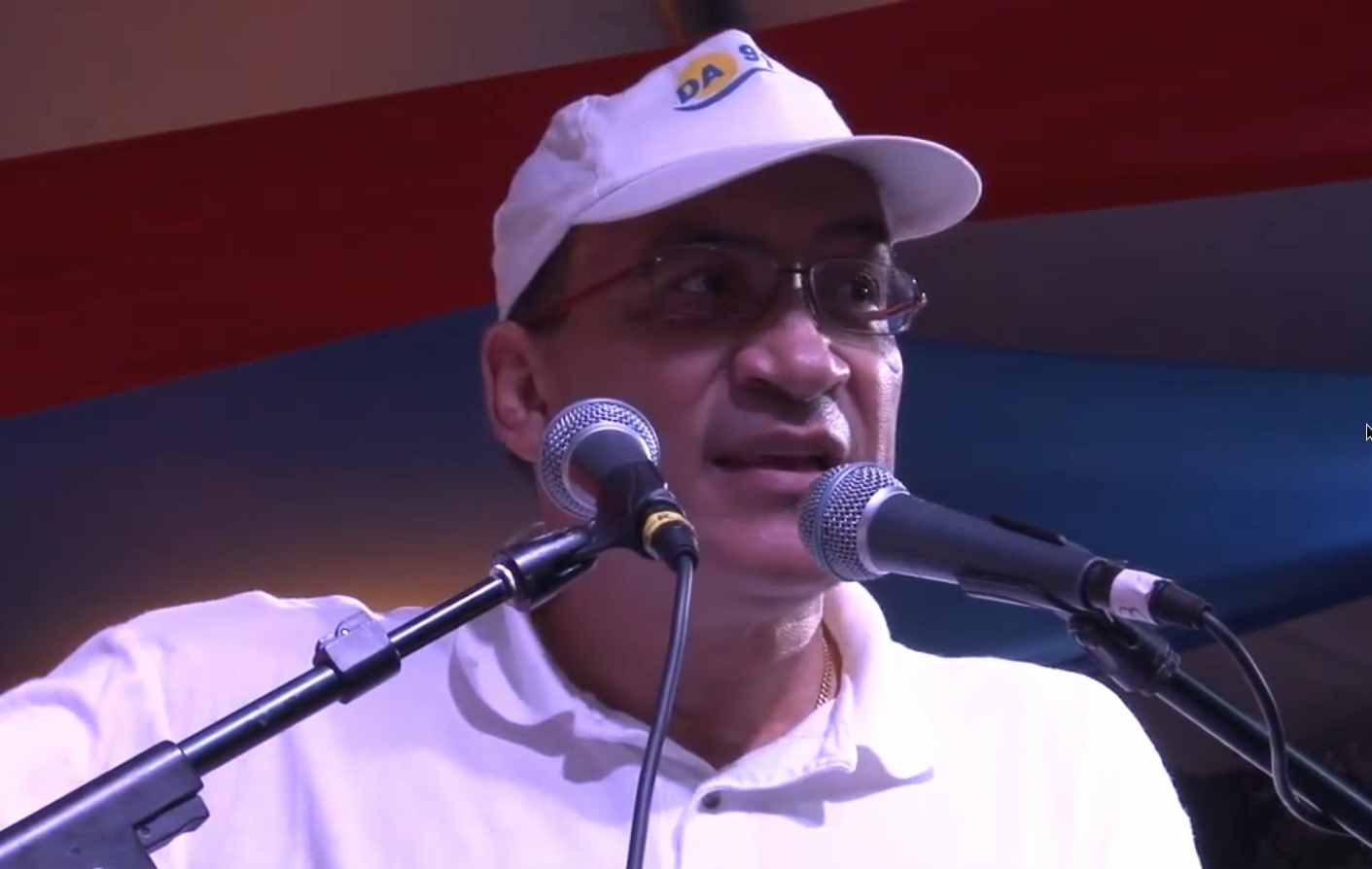

Member of the National Assembly
- In office 1991–2015
- Constituency: Paramaribo District

Personal details
- Born: 5 April 1952 (age 73) Coronie District, Suriname
- Party: Democratic Alternative '91

Winston Jessurun (born 5 April 1952) is a Surinamese politician and plastic surgeon. He was member of the National Assembly for the Democratic Alternative '91 between 1991 and 2015 for Paramaribo District.

== Career ==
Jessurun was born on 5 April 1952 in Coronie District. The party Democratic Alternative '91 (DA'91) was founded in 1991 when it split off from the National Party of Suriname. Jessurun was one of the founders, together with Gerard Brunings. Jessurun contested the 1991 Surinamese general election for the DA'91 and won a seat. He served five more terms.

For the 2010 elections Jessurun and the DA'91 joined the political alliance New Front for Democracy and Development. For the 2015 elections Jessurun was named the top candidate on the party list. He and the DA'91 entered the elections as part of the political alliance V7. He was not re-elected. On 30 September 2015 he was succeeded as chairperson of Democratic Alternative '91 by Angelic del Castilho. Jessurun became honorary chairperson.
