= Alice Amafo =

Surinamese Government minister

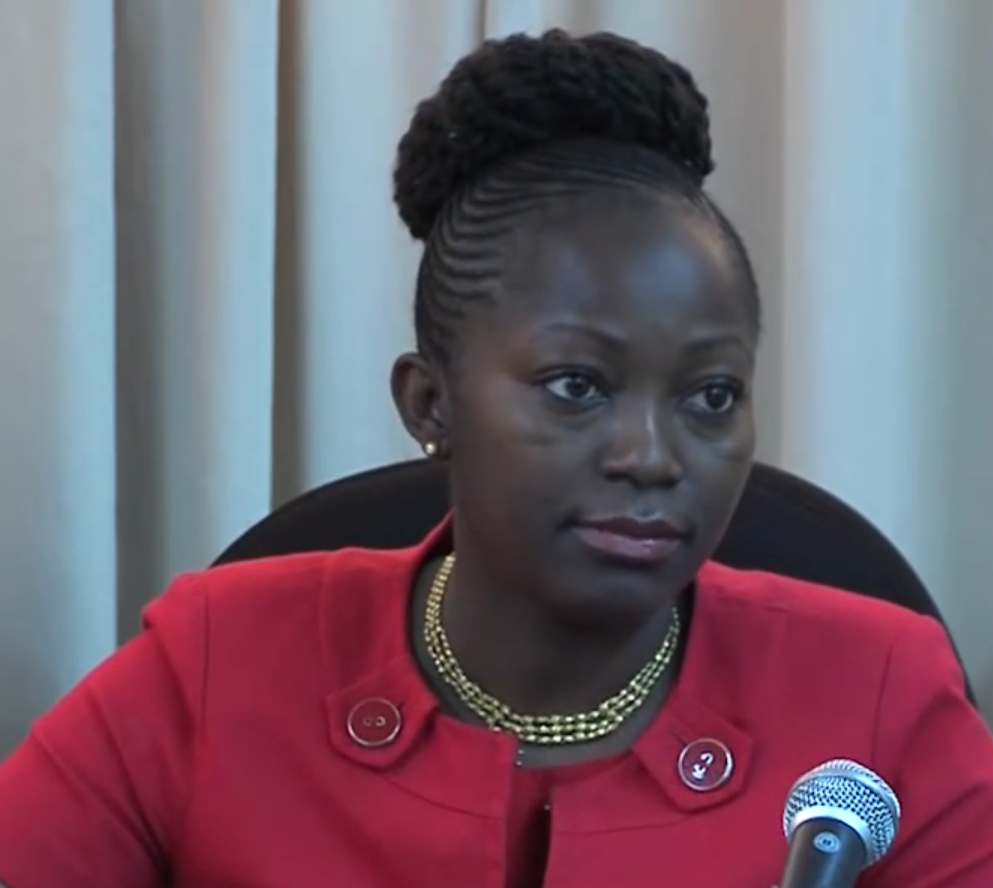
- Amafo in 2015
- Born: 4 February 1977 (age 49); Paramaribo

Alice Amafo (born 4 February 1977) is a Surinamese politician and former government minister. She was the youngest Surinamese minister when first appointed at age 28 and the first Maroon woman. She became a minister again in 2010.

== Biography ==
Alice Hortencia Amafo was born in Paramaribo in Suriname. She first qualified in Scientific Studies before taking Business Administration at Anton de Kom University where she graduated in 2003. Amafo was a follower of Ronnie Brunswijk and the ABOP party (General Liberation and Development Party).

Her first job was looking after Aeronautical statistics. She became interested in politics because of the poor access to education by women outside the cities of Suriname. Amafo had only had an education herself because her father had moved to get his children educated. She was the youngest Suriname minister at 28 when appointed in September 2005 and the first Maroon woman. She was the Minister for Transport and succeeded Guno Castelen.

She resigned in 2007 but was appointed to office again in 2010 by President Dési Bouterse as Minister of Agriculture and Housing succeeding Hendrik Setrowidjojo.
