= Angelic del Castilho =

Surinamese politician

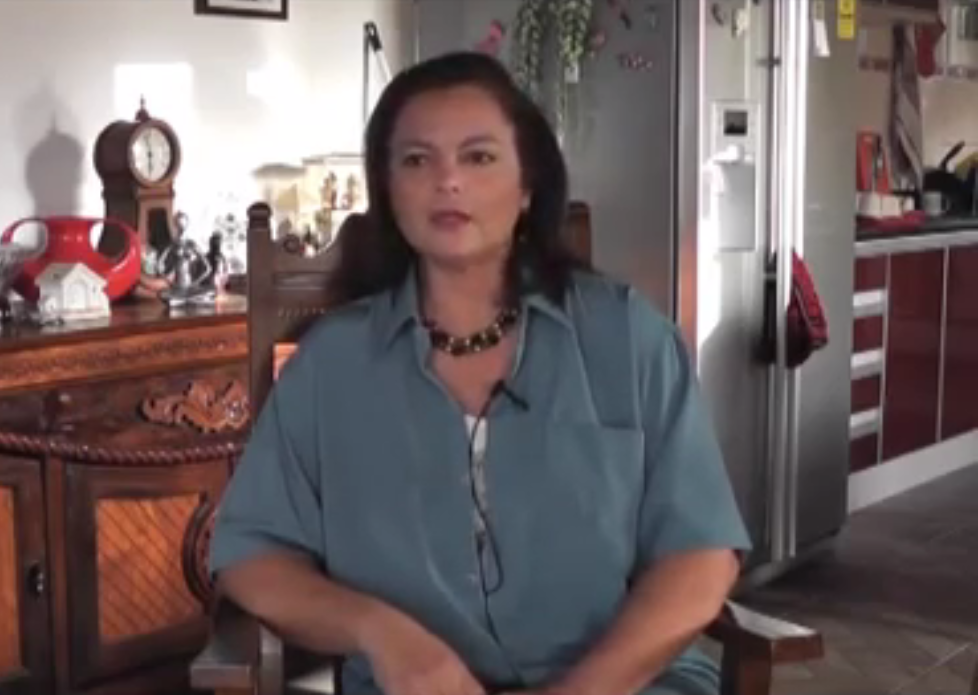
- Del Castilho in 2014

Chair of Democratic Alternative '91
- Incumbent
- Assumed office 2015

Ambassador of Suriname to Indonesia
- In office 2007–2011

Personal details
- Born: 4 April 1967 (age 59) Paramaribo, Suriname
- Party: Democratic Alternative '91 (DA'91)
- Spouse: Rudie Alihusain
- Occupation: diplomat, politician

Angelic del Castilho (born 4 April 1967), also known as Angelic Alihusain-del Castilho, is a Surinamese politician of Democratic Alternative '91, and a former ambassador.

== Early life ==
Angelic del Castilho was born on 4 April 1967 in Paramaribo, Suriname. She grew up as the eldest in a family of seven children. Her father is a retired salesman for different businesses and her mother is a retired teacher.

Del Castilho attended secondary school at the Christus Koning School in Paramaribo and junior college at the Algemene Middelbare School in Paramaribo. She participated as a member in Leo Clubs and for a short while in the Rotaract.

== Education and work experience ==
After Del Castilho obtained her diploma from the Algemene Middelbare School, she chose to study agriculture at the Anton de Kom University in Paramaribo. During her studies she did research on alternative processes for the baking of bread, making use of locally available products for flour production. Her final thesis was on the cost-effective rearing of small ruminants on small and medium-sized farms. She did additional research in the Caribbean, namely on the island of Barbados. Del Castilho obtained her Bachelor of Science degree in December 1997. In 2010 Del Castilho obtained her Master of Arts degree in Contemporary Diplomacy, summa cum laude, from the University of Malta.

During her studies Del Castilho held many part-time jobs. After she graduated she had her first job at Kersten Bakery in Paramaribo. She was hired in the position of Human Resource Manager and set-up the HR department. After this first job, Del Castilho also worked for NGO's as a trainer/consultant charged with capacity building of grassroots organisations. Del Castilho worked for the Peace Corps in Suriname as the Associate Peace Corps Director Programming and successfully selected, trained, placed and supported over 150 volunteers in a 4-year period in the position of APCD-Programming. During this period she also successfully grew the program in Suriname with 50%.

In 2006, Del Castilho was nominated as Ambassador Extraordinary and Plenipotentiary with posting Jakarta, Indonesia. In January 2011 Del Castilho returned to Suriname.

On 30 September 2015 she became chairperson of Democratic Alternative '91, succeeding Winston Jessurun. For the 2020 Surinamese general election Del Castilho was the party list leader for Paramaribo.

== Personal life ==
She is married to Rudie Alihusain.
