= Buiten-Sociëteit Het Park =

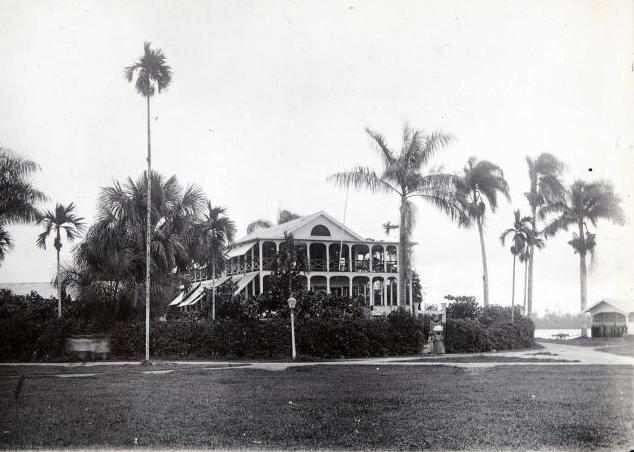
- Park House (1900s)

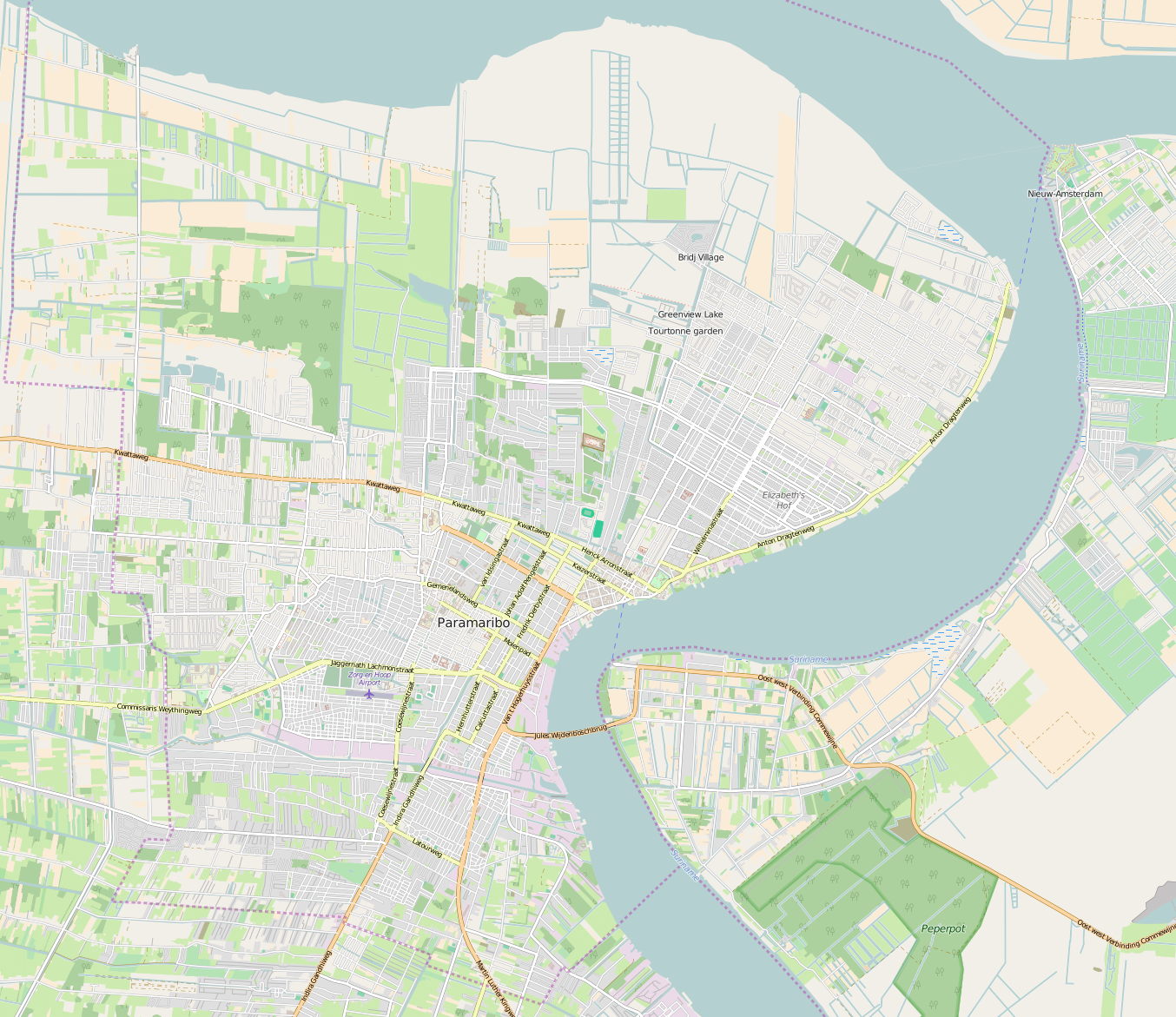
- Location within Paramaribo

General information
- Location: Paramaribo, Suriname
- Coordinates: 5.82524°N 55.15068°W
- Construction started: 1877 (original); 1968 (current)

Buiten-Sociëteit Het Park is a park and former club located on Onafhankelijkheidsplein in Paramaribo, Suriname. On 1 August 1996, the building which housed the National Assembly of Suriname burned down, and the National Assembly moved to the former park house.

== History ==
The square which is nowadays called Onafhankelijkheidsplein (Independence Square) used to be a training ground for soldiers stationed at Fort Zeelandia. In 1872, Captain van Landsberge had a meeting with governor van Sypesteyn, and it was decided to turn the grounds into a military park. The park would be maintained by the army, but it was accessible to the public. The army constructed a buffet, a bandstand, and a bowling alley on the park.

In 1877, the park became the property of the Buiten-Sociëteit ‘Het Park’, a private club. The club used to gather at the plantation house of plantation Dordrecht. The plantation house was disassembled, and rebuilt on the square as the club house. There were popular protests against removing access to the bandstand. On 17 May 1885, the bandstand was moved to the square. Until the beginning of the 20th century, there was a musical performance every Sunday afternoon.

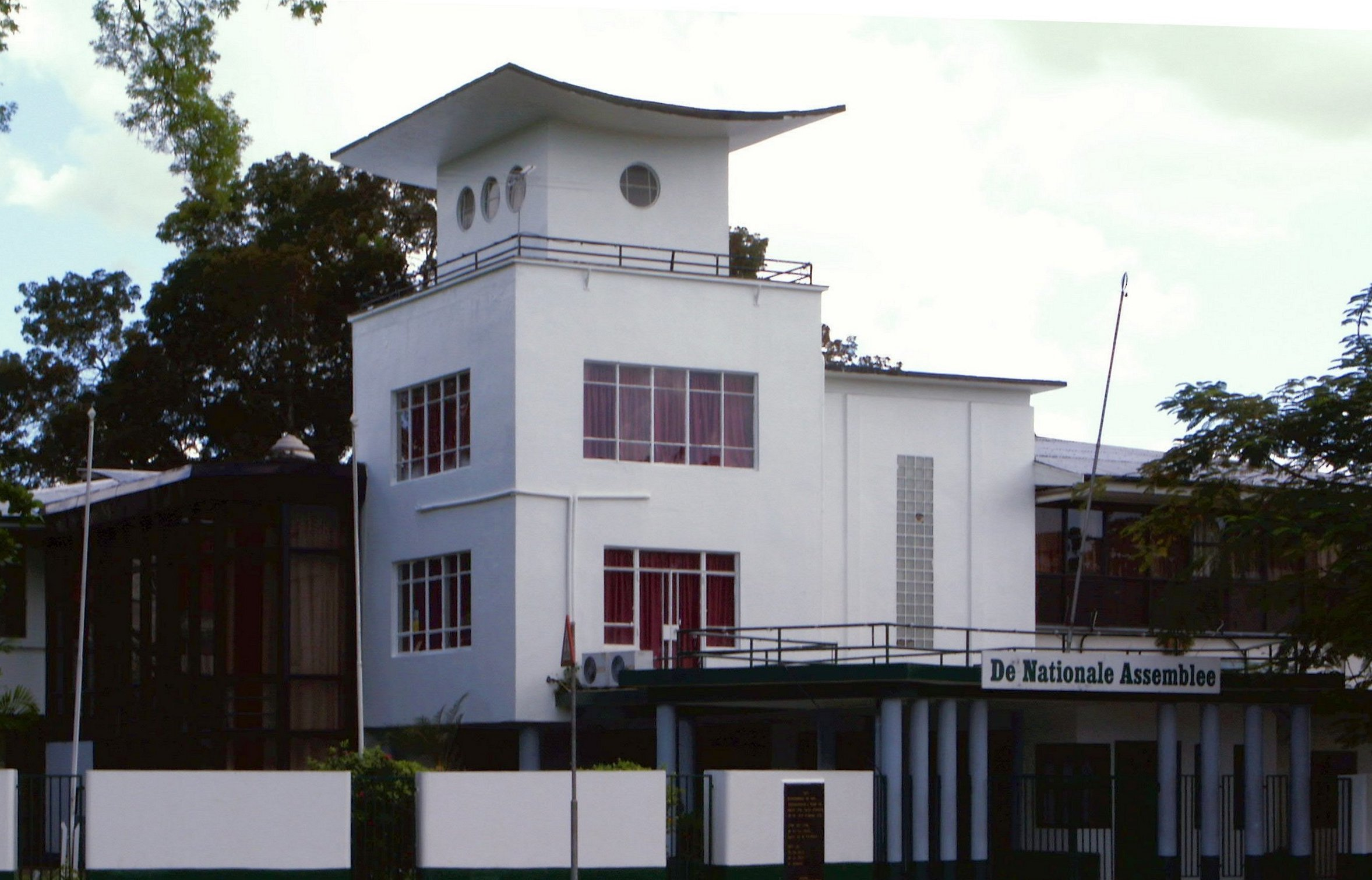
1968 building housing the National Assembly

The park house was extended in 1960. In 1968, a new building was constructed at the site. After the 1980 Surinamese coup d'état, the park house was confiscated by the military regime. The club moved to Combé.

On 1 August 1996, the building which housed the National Assembly of Suriname burned down, and the National Assembly moved to the former park house. In 2015, a commission was established to construct a new building for the parliament, however as of 2021, the National Assembly remains in the park house.
