= V7 (political alliance) =

V7 was a political alliance in Suriname formed for the 2015 elections.

== History ==
V7 was formed in January 2015 to contest the 2015 elections, and was established as an alliance of seven parties; the Progressive Reform Party, the National Party of Suriname, the Surinamese Labour Party, the Democratic Alternative '91 (all of which had been members of the New Front for Democracy and Development alliance for the 2010 elections), Pertjajah Luhur, the Party for National Unity and Solidarity and the Brotherhood and Unity in Politics. However, shortly before the elections, the Party for National Unity and Solidarity left to join the A-Combination.

The alliance nominated Chan Santokhi as its presidential candidate. In the elections it received 37% of the vote, winning 18 of the 51 seats in the National Assembly. However, the National Democratic Party won a majority of the seats.

On 25 June 2015, V7 collapsed after several politicians split off from the Pertjajah Luhur, and the Brotherhood and Unity in Politics left the alliance.
