= Rashied Doekhi =

Surinamese politician

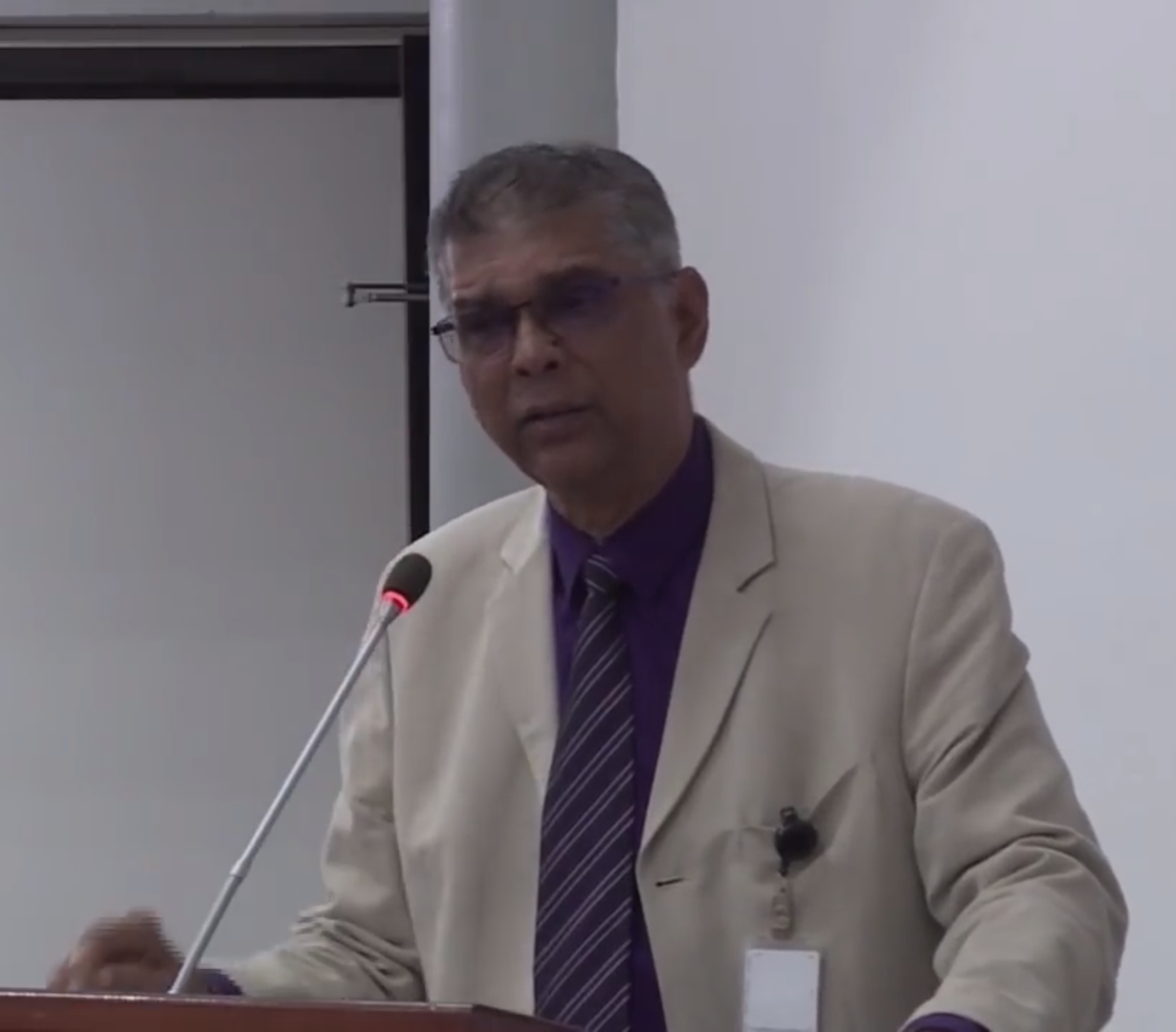
- Doekhi in 2019

Member of the National Assembly
- In office 2000–2020

Personal details
- Born: Mohamed Rashied Doekhi; 16 January 1955 (age 71) Suriname
- Party: National Democratic Party
- Occupation: Politician

Mohamed Rashied Doekhi (born 16 January 1955) is a Surinamese politician and a former district commissioner of Nickerie. Because of his popularity in the western rice district, he is nicknamed the president of Nickerie. He was a member of the National Assembly of Suriname, between 2000 and 2020 on behalf of the National Democratic Party of Dési Bouterse.

== Career ==
=== Presidential elections 2000 ===
In 2000, the Millennium Combination of Desi Bouterse unexpectedly nominated Doekhi as a candidate for the presidential elections of July 2000. Doekhie's opponent in the elections was Ronald Venetiaan. Doekhi lost the elections and Venetiaan was, for the second time, chosen as president of Suriname.

=== Fight in the parliament ===
On 13 December 2007, there was a fight in the Surinamese parliament in which Doekhi was involved. It all started after the suspension of a heated discussion about alleged corruption at the ministry of Ground and Forestry. According to Doekhi then chairman of the parliament Paul Somohardjo was also involved and Doekhi accused him of repeatedly enriching himself and his affiliated foundations with pieces of land from the government. "I know of no Somohardjo who has ever been in prison, but you, Doekhie, go inquire how many Doekhis there are in prison," replied Somohardjo shortly before he suspended the debate and walked away from his chair. Glaringly Doekhi rushed towards Somohardjo and an altercation followed between the two. What was said could not be heard, because after suspension the sound in the parliament gets turned off. MP Ronnie Brunswijk, who noticed the altercation, interfered between the two and shortly after this Doekhi pushed Somohardjo. Brunswijk vigorously pushed Doekhi who subsequently ended up with his back on a table. Brunswijk grabbed Doekhi by the ankles and pulled him to the floor. Thereafter both Brunswijk and Somohardjo gave Doekhi some firm kicks. Through intervention of police and other parliamentarians, the fight ended. The fight was aired live on the television and caused international disgrace for the Surinamese parliament and Suriname as country. Doekhi filed a complaint against Somohardjo and Brunswijk.

On several occasions, Doekhi was allotted large areas of land by the government. Altogether, over one thousand acres of state land was allocated to him.

=== Elections 2010 ===
At the Surinamese parliamentary elections of May 2010, Doekhi had the number one place on the MegaCombinatie (a political alliance chaired by Desi Bouterse) voting's list in Nickerie. At the elections Doekhi was re-elected as member of National Assembly of Suriname.
