= New Front for Democracy and Development =

Political alliance in Suriname

New Front for Democracy and Development Nieuw Front voor Democratie en Ontwikkeling
- Preceded by: Front for Democracy and Development
- Succeeded by: V7
- Ideology: Social democracy
- Political position: Centre-left

The New Front for Democracy and Development (Dutch: Nieuw Front voor Democratie en Ontwikkeling) was a social-democratic political alliance in Suriname.

== History ==
In the May 2005 general elections the alliance received 39% of the vote and won 23 of the 51 seats in the National Assembly. And at the elections of 2010 the party won 14 out of the 51 seats. The alliance is formed by:

- National Party of Suriname (Nationale Partij Suriname)
- Progressive Reform Party (Vooruitstrevende Hervormings Partij)
- Democratic Alternative '91 (Democratisch Alternatief '91)
- Surinamese Labour Party (Surinaamse Partij van de Arbeid)
- Pertjajah Luhur

1991		
1996		
2000	New Front alliance: 33 / 51 NPS: 16 / 51 VHP: 7 / 51 PL: 6 / 51 SPA: 4 / 51	▲9
2005	New Front alliance: 23 / 51 NPS: 8 / 51 VHP: 7 / 51 PL: 6 / 51 SPA: 2 / 51	▼10
2020	New Front alliance: 14 / 51 VHP: 8 / 51 NPS: 4 / 51 SPA: 1 / 51 DA'91 1 / 51	▼9
