= Onafhankelijkheidsplein =

Square in Paramaribo, Suriname

Coordinates: 5°49′34.43″N 55°9′5.47″W

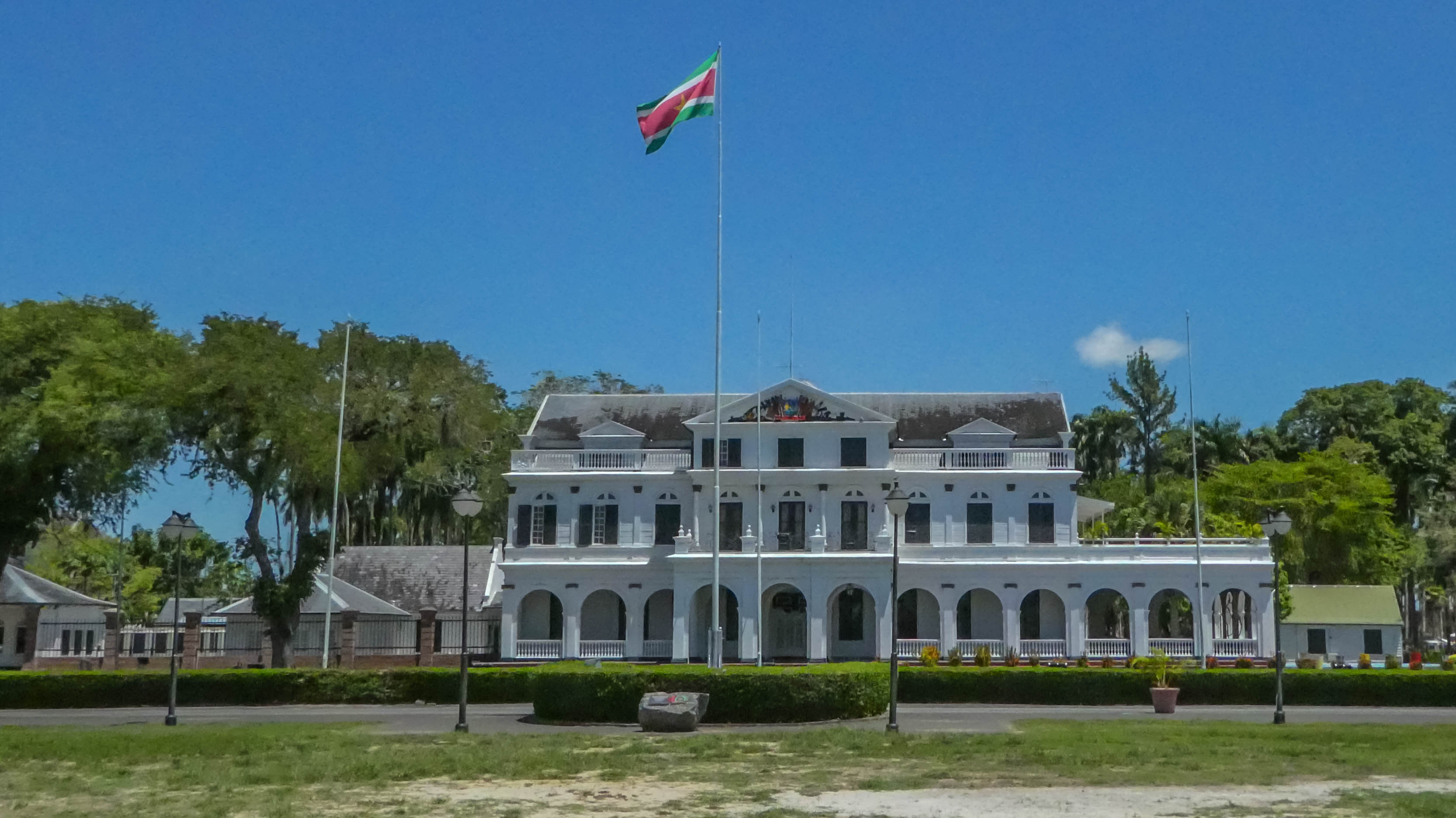
The square with the Presidential Palace of Suriname

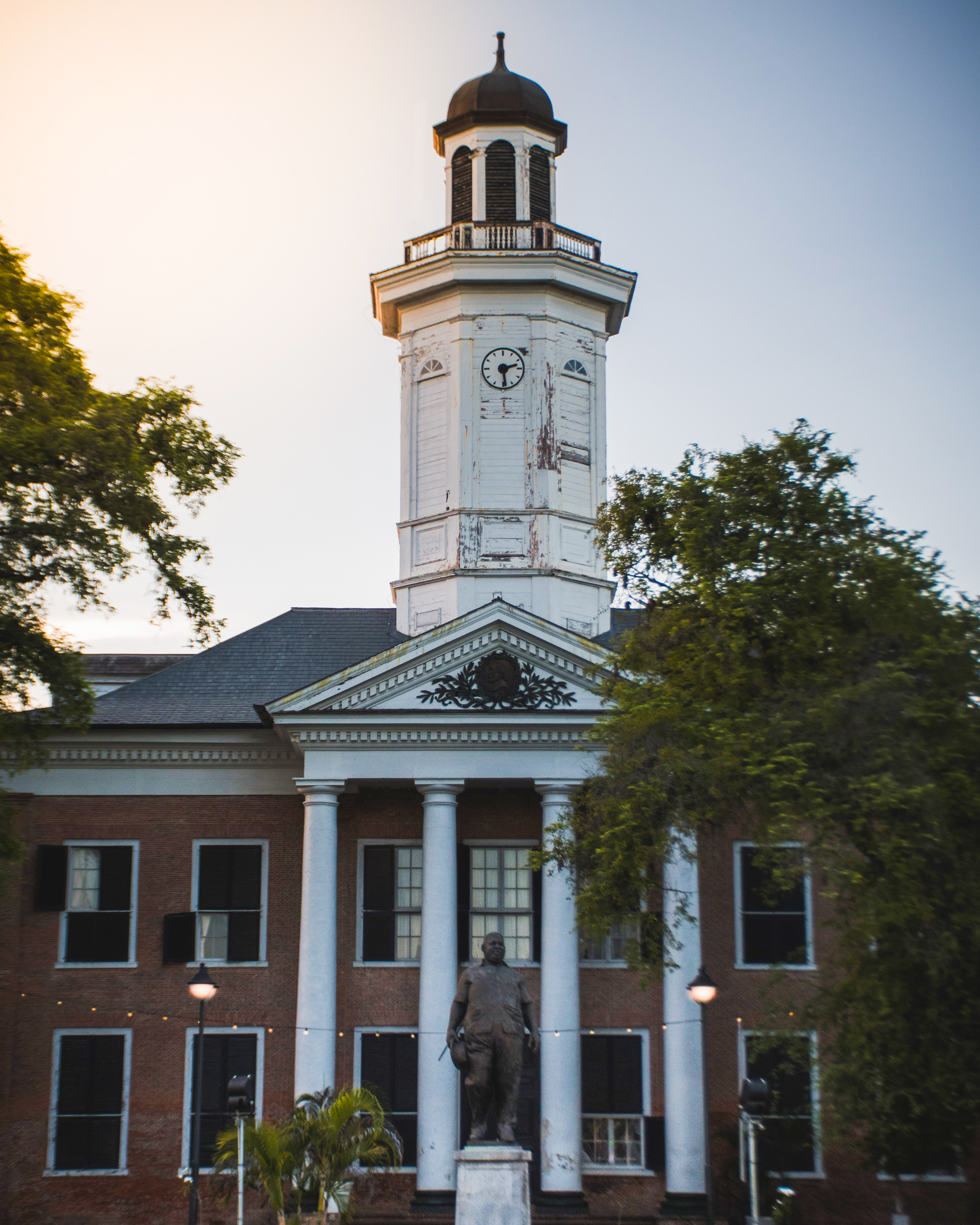
Ministry of Finance

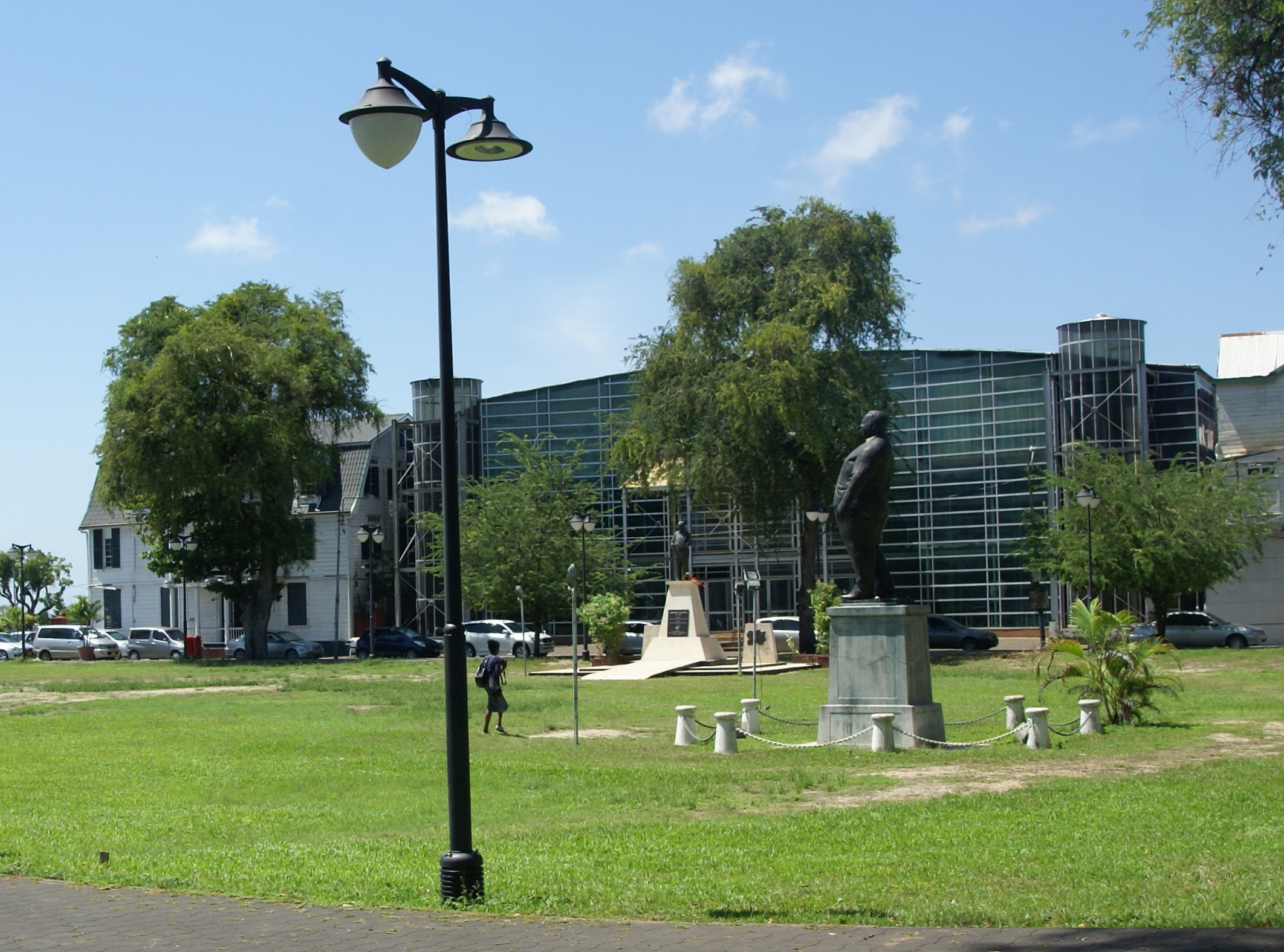
Congress Hall

The Onafhankelijkheidsplein (Dutch pronunciation: [ɔnɑfˈɦɑŋkələkɦɛitsˌplɛin]; Independence Square) is a town square in Paramaribo, the capital of Suriname. The square is situated in the historical inner city, near the Suriname River and the Presidential Palace of Suriname.

Before the independence of Suriname from the Netherlands in 1975, it was also called the Oranjeplein (Orange Square) and the Gouvernementsplein (Government Square).

Buiten-Sociëteit Het Park is located on the square. On 1 August 1996, the building which housed the National Assembly of Suriname burnt down. The National Assembly moved to the former park house.

Other buildings on the square include the Ministry of Finance and the Congress Hall.
