= Paradise, Suriname =

Paradise
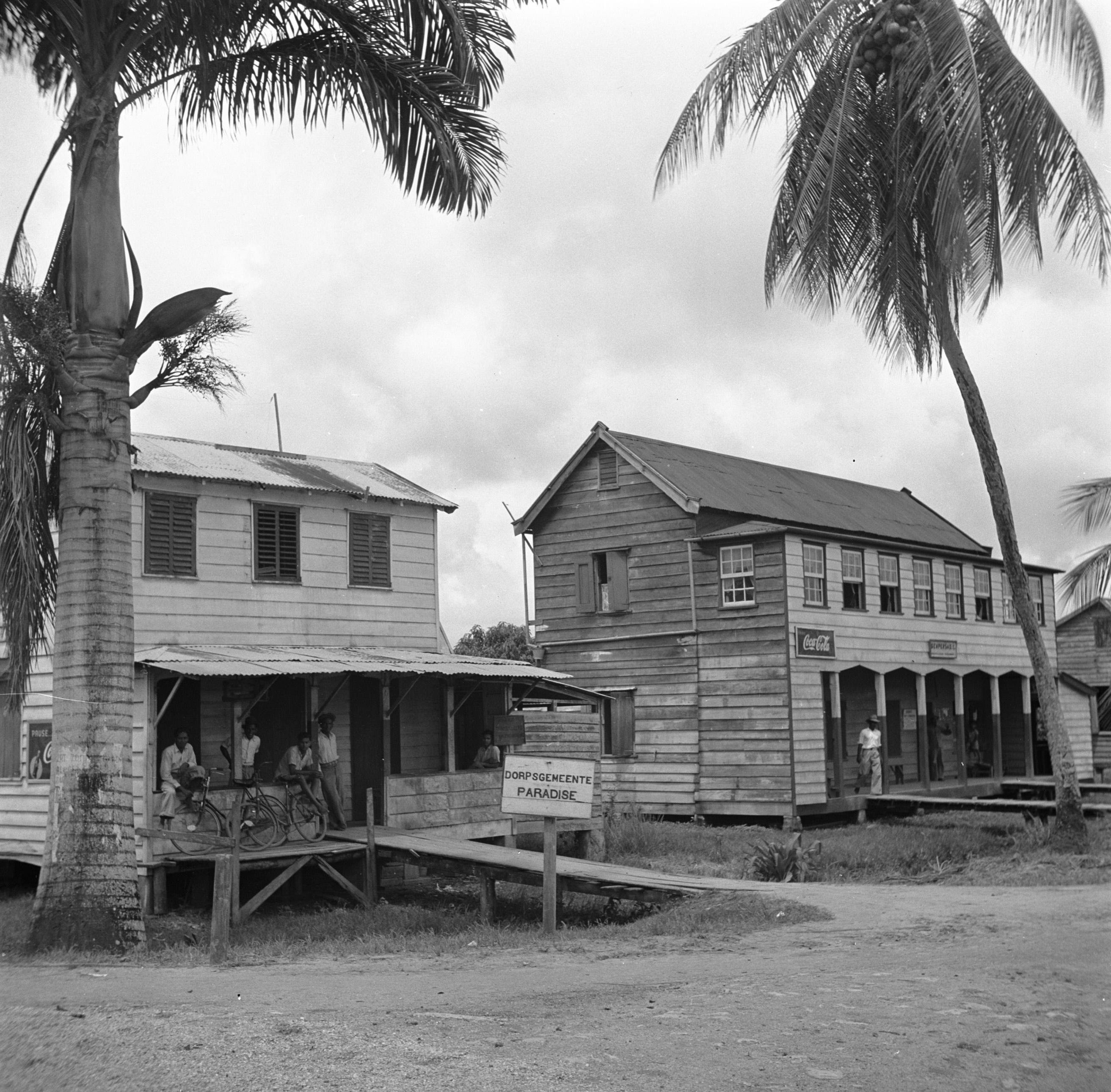
- Paradise (1947)

- Location in Suriname
- Coordinates: 5°54′38″N 56°55′40″W
- Country: Suriname
- District: Nickerie District
- Resort (municipality): Oostelijke Polders

Paradise is a village in the Nickerie District of Suriname. It has a population of about 966 residents. The village is located about two kilometers from the town of Nieuw Nickerie.

The village is named after the sugar and cotton plantation Paradise The plantation was founded in 1797. Paradise and Plaisance were the first two concessions for plantations in Nickerie. On 31 December 1913, the plantation was disbanded and turned into 335 plots for small scale agriculture. The plantation was also home to several dozen free slaves. A railway station was planned in Paradise, however the plan was never completed.

== See also ==
- Nieuw Nickerie
