= Congress Hall (Paramaribo) =

Convention and exhibition centre in Paramaribo, Suriname

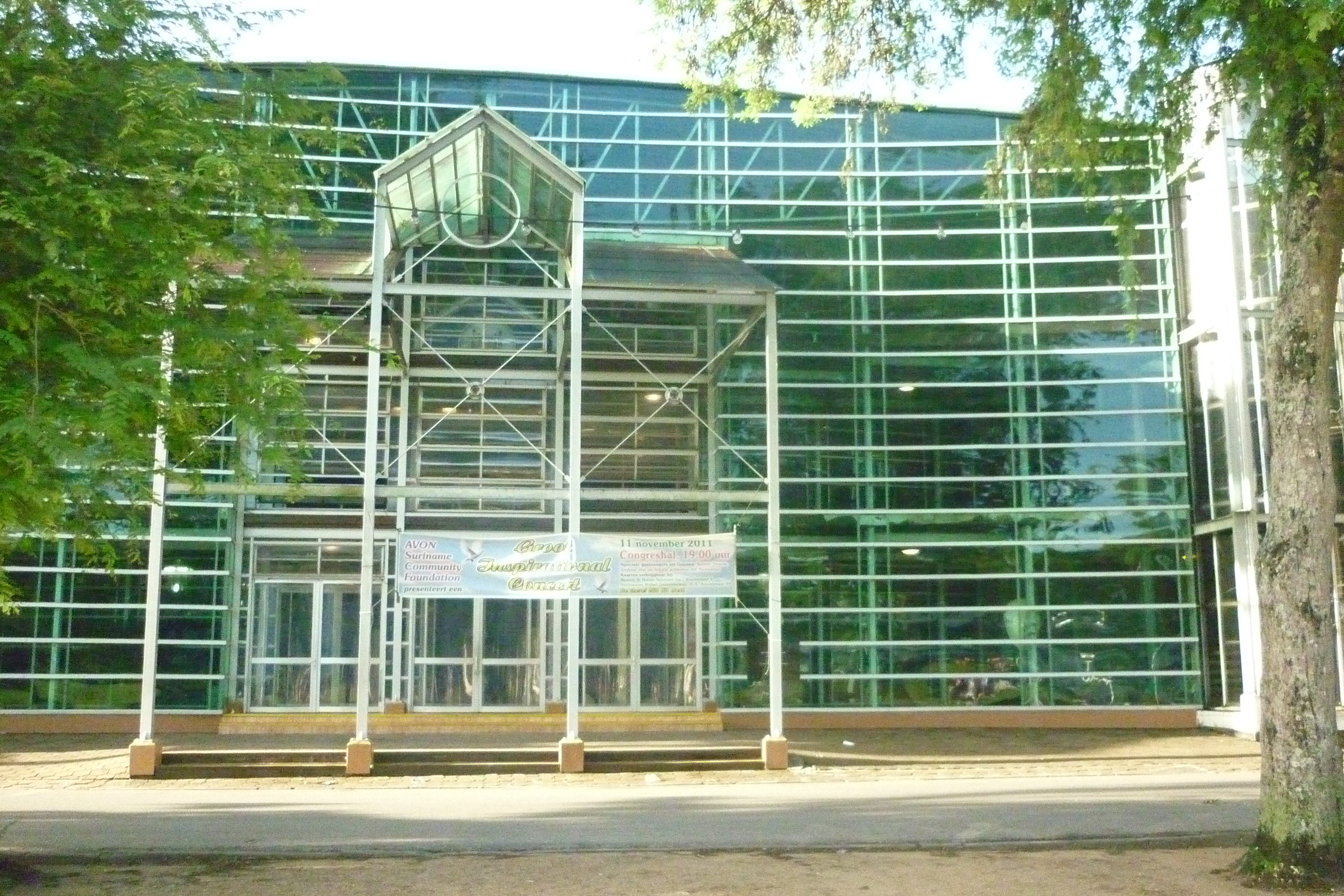

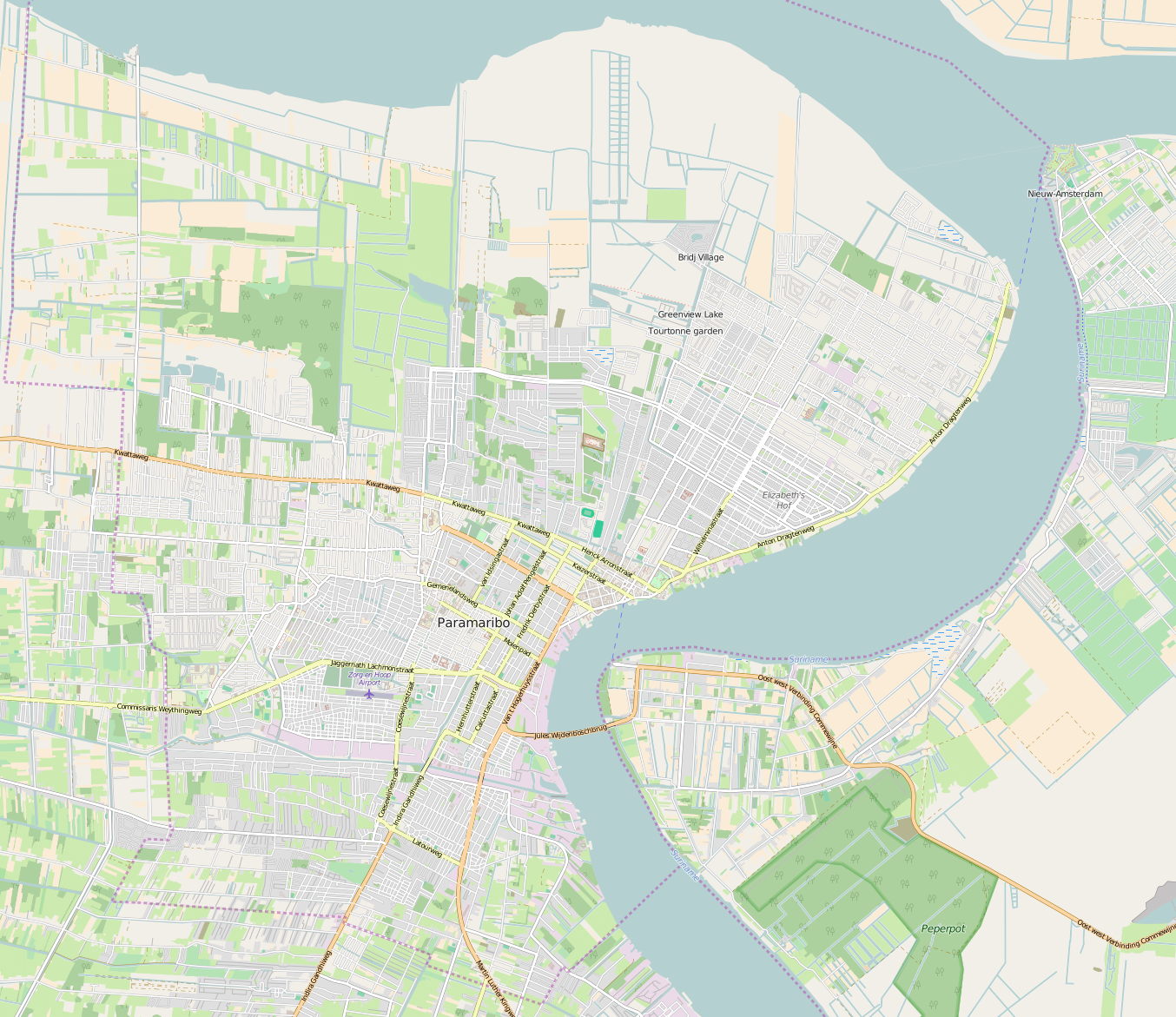
- Location within Paramaribo

General information
- Location: Paramaribo, Suriname
- Coordinates: 5.82577°N 55.15222°W
- Completed: 1999
- Cost: ƒ 2 million.

Design and construction
- Architect: Arie Verkuijl

The Congress Hall (Dutch: Congreshal) is a convention and exhibition centre in Paramaribo, Suriname. It is located on Onafhankelijkheidsplein, and was completed in 1999.

== Overview ==
In 1998, the Wijdenbosch government decided to build a convention centre for the 1999 CARICOM meeting. The Congress Hall was to be built on the location of the Palace Hotel. Arie Verkuijl was chosen to design the building. Verkuijl wanted a completely transparent building. Aluminium was not an option, therefore, the building was constructed using steel and acrylite, commonly known as plexiglass. The Congresshall was built in six months, but initially suffered from a leakage problem which required the replacement of the stage and flooring.

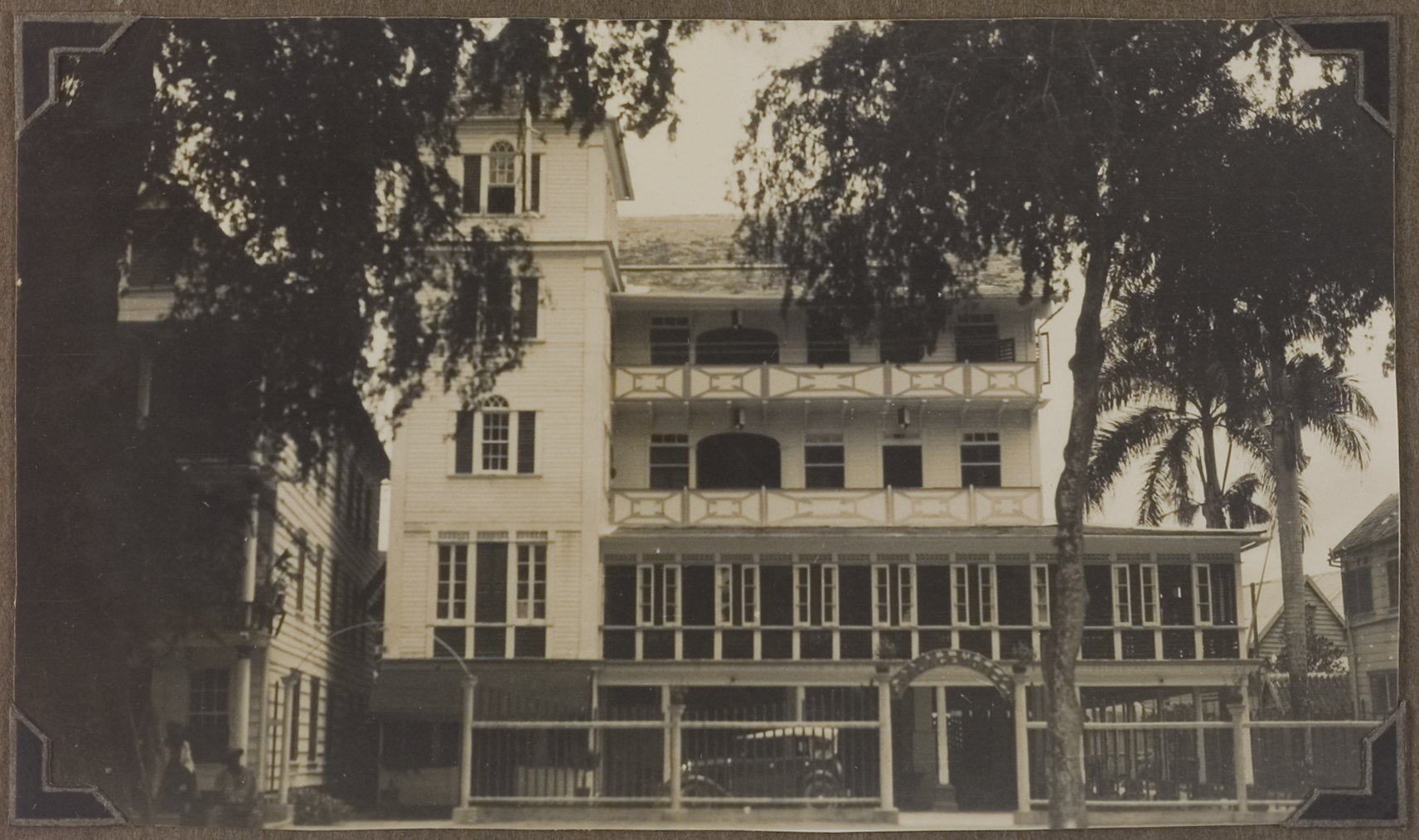
The former Palace Hotel

The Congress Hall is considered a controversial building. There are people who consider the building out of place among the historic wooden buildings in Paramaribo, and a poor replacement of the Palace Hotel, while others praise the vision of the architect. The statues of Jagernath Lachmon and Jopie Pengel are located on the square across the building.
