= 1991 Surinamese general election =

- 25 May 1991
- 51 seats in the National Assembly; 26 seats needed for a majority
- Turnout: 69.30% (▼15.66pp)
Party	Leader	Vote %	Seats	+/–
NFDO	Ronald Venetiaan	54.29	30	−10
NDP	Dési Bouterse	21.68	12	+9
DA'91–PL	Hans Prade	16.65	9	+5
This lists parties that won seats. See the complete results below.
Results by district
Chairman of the National Assembly before	Chairman of the National Assembly after
Jagernath Lachmon; VHP	Jagernath Lachmon; VHP

General elections were held in Suriname on 25 May 1991. The result was a victory for the New Front for Democracy and Development (an alliance of the National Party of Suriname, the Progressive Reform Party, the Party for National Unity and Solidarity and the Surinamese Labour Party), which won 30 of the 51 seats. Voter turnout was 69%

== Results ==
Party	Votes	%	Seats	+/–
New Front for Democracy and Development	86,217	54.29	30	–10
National Democratic Party	34,429	21.68	12	+9
Democratic Alternative '91–Pendawa Lima (Note: Democratic Alternative '91 won seven of the nine seats and Pendawa Lima two.)	26,446	16.65	9	+5
Progressive Workers' and Farmers' Union	4,807	3.03	0	–4
Partij Perbangunan Rakjat Suriname	4,463	2.81	0	0
People's Party	1,232	0.78	0	New
General Liberation and Development Party	616	0.39	0	New
Progressive Surinamese People's Party	599	0.38	0	New
Total	158,809	100.00	51	0
Valid votes	158,809	92.80		
Invalid/blank votes	12,313	7.20		
Total votes	171,122	100.00		
Registered voters/turnout	246,929	69.30		
Source: Nohlen, Consulytic, Centraal HoofdStembureau
