= Guno Castelen =

Surinamese politician (born 1962)

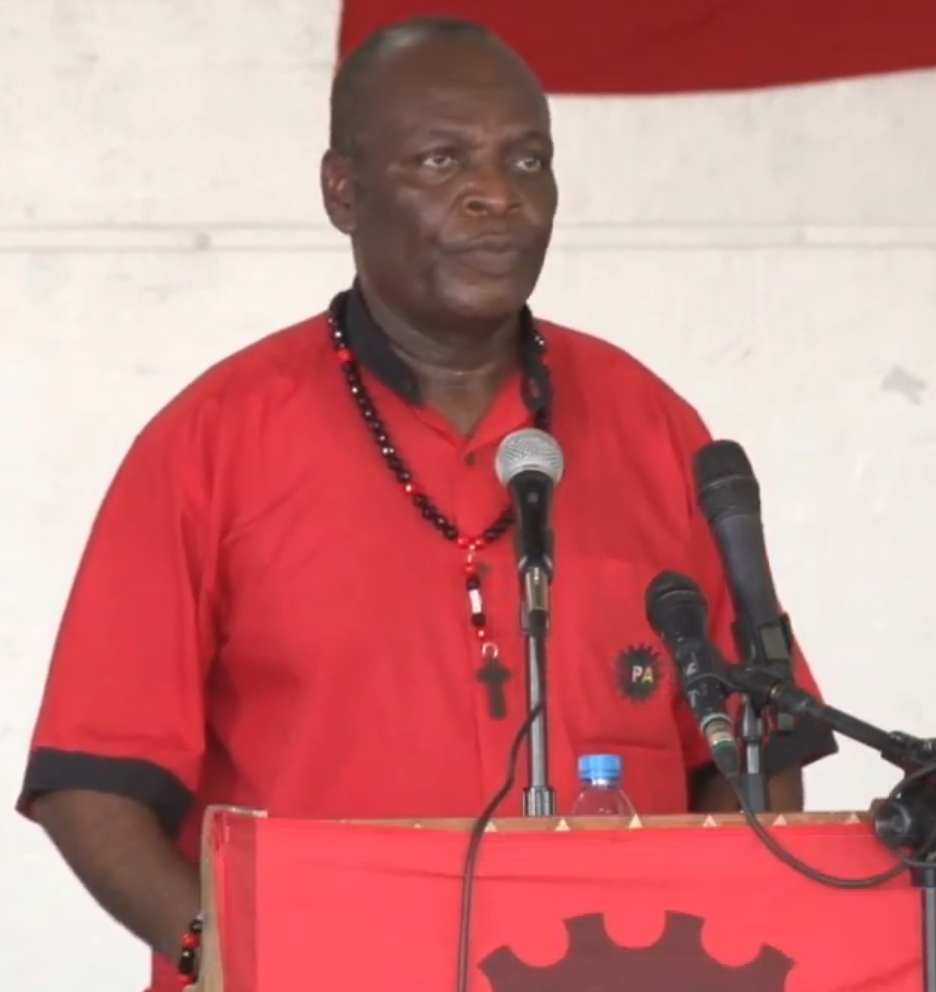
- in 2019

Minister of Transport, Communication and Tourism
- In office 2000–2005
- Preceded by: Dick de Bie
- Succeeded by: Alice Amafo

Chairman of the Surinamese Labour Party
- Incumbent
- Assumed office 2009
- Preceded by: Siegfried Gilds

Personal details
- Born: Guno Henry George Castelen; 28 September 1962 (age 64) Paramaribo
- Party: Surinamese Labour Party
- Occupation: politician

Guno Henry George Castelen is a Surinamese Labour Party legislator and former Minister for Transportation, Communication, & Tourism. Alice Amafo succeeded him as Minister for Transportation, Communication, & Tourism.
