= Ruth Wijdenbosch =

Surinamese politician

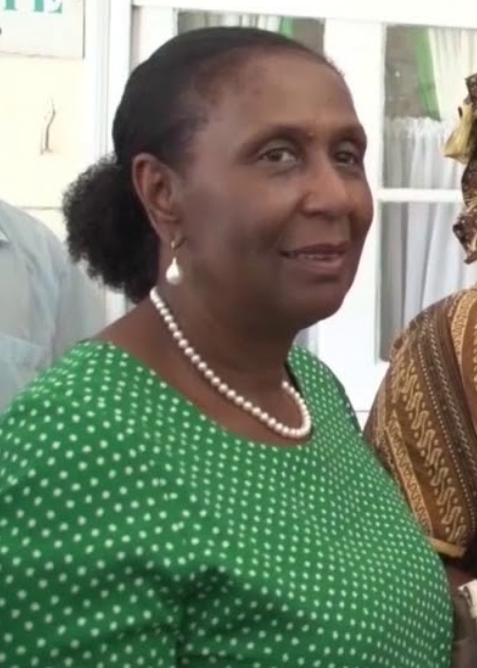
- Wijdenbosch in 2018

Vice Chairperson of the National Assembly of Suriname
- In office 2010–2015

Member of the National Assembly
- In office 1987–2015

Personal details
- Born: Ruth Jeanette Wijdenbosch; 18 May 1947 (age 79) Suriname
- Party: National Party of Suriname
- Education: Anton de Kom University of Suriname

Ruth Jeanette Wijdenbosch (born 18 June 1947) is a Surinamese politician. She served as a member of the National Assembly of Suriname from 1987 until 2015, on behalf of the National Party of Suriname.

== Biography ==
Wijdenbosch was raised in Zanderij, a village 40 kilometers from Paramaribo. She studied law at the Anton de Kom University of Suriname, but had to interrupt her studies for a long time in 1980 because the university was closed due to the Sergeants' Coup and the December murders. She graduated from the university in 1989. During this period she worked at the Vervuurts Bank (later known as Hakrinbank).

In 1987, she entered politics and joined the National Party of Suriname (NPS). She founded the local branch De Nieuwe Horizon among others, of which she became chairwoman. In the same year, she was asked to join the National Assembly, a request she accepted.

In 1997, she was nominated by the cores of the Paramaribo branch of the NPS as vice-chairwoman of the party board. However, this nomination was ignored. Instead, she was offered a place somewhere at the bottom of the candidate list, which she refused. On the advice of Henck Arron, whom she considered her most important political guru, she chose sides in an internal party struggle. In doing so, she voluntarily chose the side of Meeting Point 2000 and took a place on the candidate list of this political group. This almost ended her political career, but she still managed to hold her own within the party.

In 2010, Wijdenbosch was elected vice-chair of the National Assembly. In 2015, she retired from politics after 27 years as a member of parliament. She was elected six times as a member.

In November 2020, Wijdenbosch was awarded the title of Commander of the Honorary Order of the Palm by President Chan Santokhi.
