= Political Wing of the FAL =

Political party in Suriname

The Political Wing of the FAL (Dutch: Politieke Vleugel van de FAL, PVF) is a centre-left agrarian political party in Suriname, founded on 28 May 1995. The party is the political wing of the Federation of Farmers and Agricultural Workers (Dutch: Federatie van Agrariërs en Landarbeiders, FAL).

At the May 2005 Surinamese legislative election the party was part of the "A1" electoral alliance that won 6.2% of the popular vote and three out of 51 seats in the National Assembly.
