= Democratic Alternative '91 =

Political party in Suriname

Democratic Alternative '91 Democratisch Alternatief '91
- Chairperson: Angelic del Castilho
- Founded: 3 August 1991
- Split from: National Party
- Ideology: Liberalism; Liberal conservatism Libertarianism
- Political position: Centre to centre-right
- National affiliation: V7 (2015); New Front for Democracy and Development (formerly)
- International affiliation: International Alliance of Libertarian Parties; Liberal International (observer)

Website
- da91.org

The Democratic Alternative '91 (Dutch: Democratisch Alternatief '91, DA'91) is a liberal political party in Suriname.

== History ==
The DA '91 was founded in 1991 when it split off from the National Party of Suriname. The party was founded shortly before the 1991 general election. The intention had been to establish the party in 1991 but the "Telephone Coup" that removed President Ramsewak Shankar from office interfered with the planning.

Winston Jessurun was one of the founders, together with Gerard Brunings. Brunings has stated that when establishing the party they asked the Dutch embassy for programs of Dutch political parties and that of Democrats 66 appealed most to them. With the most significant change being changing Netherlands for Suriname.

In the 1991 elections, the party obtained 9 seats. At the 1996 elections the number of seats dropped to four. It further dropped to two in the 2000 elections and one in the 2005 elections. Even though the party gained only one seat it was able to join the third cabinet of President Ronald Venetiaan and had one Minister in the cabinet and received an ambassadorship.

For the 2010 elections, the DA'91 joined the political alliance New Front for Democracy and Development that won 31.6% of the popular vote and 14 out of 51 seats in the National Assembly. Out of these 14, one seat went to DA'91.

For the 2015 elections, DA'91 entered the elections as part of the political alliance V7. On 30 September 2015 Angelic del Castilho became chairperson of the party, succeeding Winston Jessurun.
