= Paul Somohardjo =

Surinamese politician

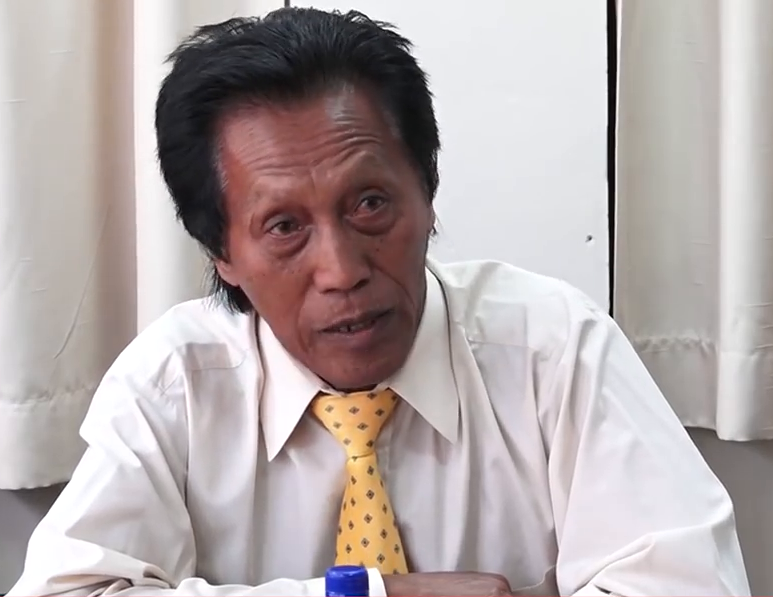
- Somohardjo in 2016

Member of the National Assembly
- In office 1991–2020
- Constituency: Paramaribo District

7th Chairman of the National Assembly of Suriname
- In office 30 June 2005 – 30 June 2010
- Preceded by: Ram Sardjoe
- Succeeded by: Jennifer Simons

Personal details
- Born: Paul Slamet Somohardjo; 2 May 1943 (age 82) Paramaribo, Suriname
- Party: Pertjajah Luhur
- Occupation: Politician

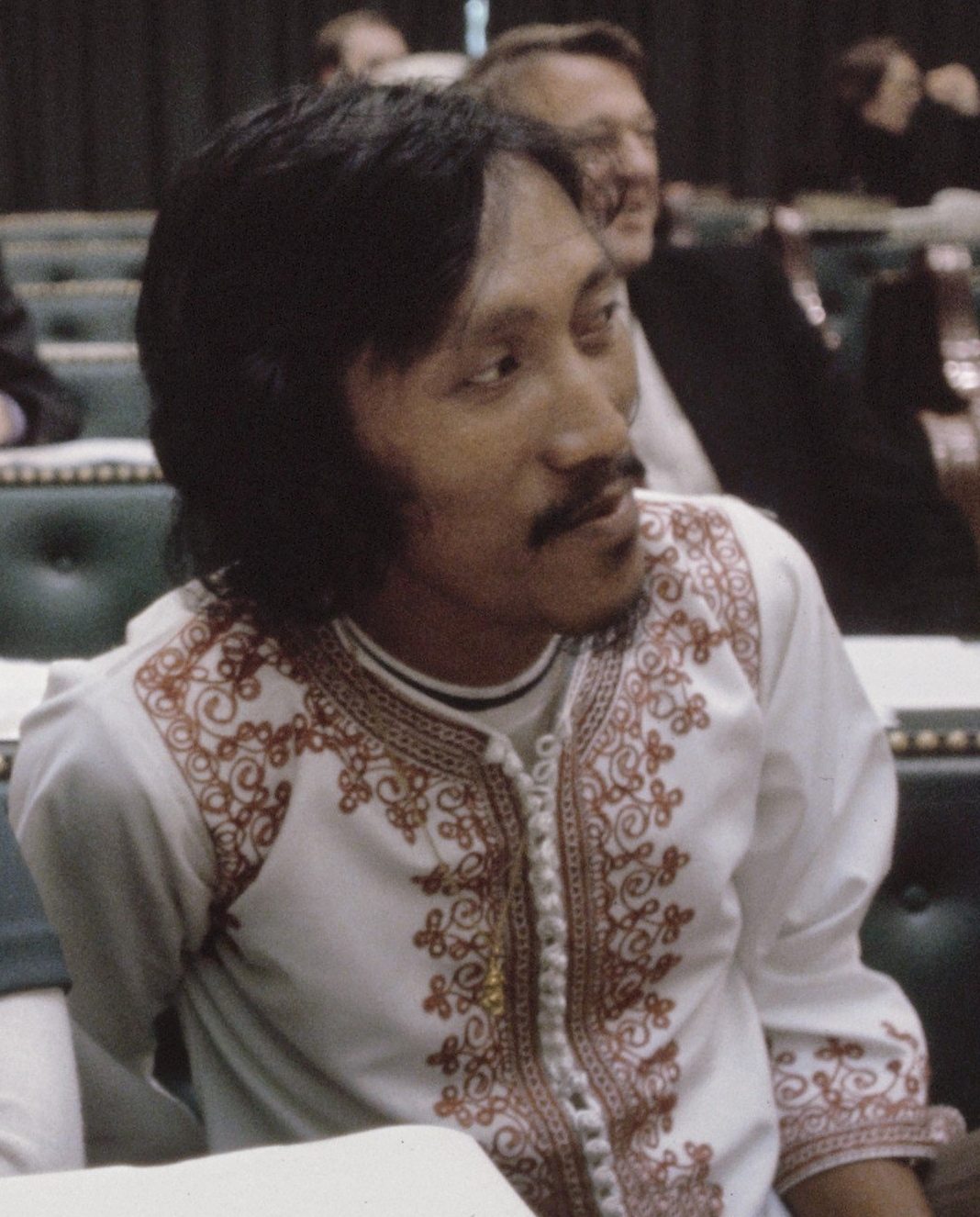
Somohardjo in 1975

Paul Slamet Somohardjo (born 2 May 1943) is a Surinamese politician. Somohardjo also owns a radio and television station.

== Biography ==
In 1973, Somohardjo was elected to the Estates of Suriname as a member of the National Party of Suriname (NPS). During the negotiations for the Independence of Suriname joined the opposition together with two other members of the government, because they considered the planned independence too hastily, and wanted a longer trajectory.

In 1977, Somohardjo was one of the founders of the Javanese party Pendawa Lima. In 1980, there was a coup d'état which brought Desi Bouterse to power. In 1982, Somohardjo was jailed for alleged involvement in a counter-coup by Surendre Rambocus which was later changed to house arrest. On 7 December 1982, he received permission to visit the funeral of his grandmother, and used the opportunity to escape to the Netherlands.

On 3 December 1984, Somohardjo participated in the Dutch television program Karel by Karel van de Graaf. It was a discussion program featuring opponents of Bouterse. During the live broadcast Evert Tjon emerged from the audience, and attacked Somohardjo. The broadcast changed to a "Please Wait" sign, and was quickly ended. After the broadcast, two shots were fired, and one person got wounded.

After an internal power struggle, the party was split, and in December 1998, Somohardjo founded Pertjajah Luhur (PL) and became the President of the party.

In 2002, a Miss Jawa competition was organized. In 2003 while serving as Minister of Social Affairs, Somohardjo was accused by one of the contestants of indecent behaviour and touching her. He was declared not guilty of the accusation due to lack of evidence, but received a conditional two months sentence for being in the dressing room, and not leaving after being asked to. On 20 February 2003, he resigned as Minister due to his conviction.

On 30 June 2005, Somohardjo was the Chairman of the National Assembly, and he served until June 2010. On 13 December 2007 after a heated argument, Rashied Doekhi attacked Somohardjo. Ronnie Brunswijk interfered in the altercation. After Doekhi was down, both Somohardjo and Brunswijk kicked him. The whole event was broadcast on live television and caused international disgrace.

In 2020, Somhardjo failed re-election to the National Assembly. He was the oldest parliamentarian in the National Assembly from 2016 to 2020. On 1 July, Paul Somohardjo, chairman of Pertjajah Luhur and coalition partner of the new government was diagnosed COVID-19 positive. He was taken to the Academic Hospital Paramaribo in the evening of 30 June. On 3 July, he was released from hospital and in a stable condition.

== See also ==
- Politics of Suriname

Preceded by Ram Sardjoe	Speaker of the National Assembly of Suriname; 2005–2010	Succeeded by Jennifer Simons
Preceded by Position established	Chairman of the Pertjajah Luhur; 1998–present	Incumbent
