= Pertjajah Luhur =

Surinamese political party

Full of Trust Pertjajah Luhur
- Abbreviation: PL
- Leader: Paul Somohardjo
- Founded: 5 December 1998
- Split from: Pendawa Lima
- Ideology: Javanese Surinamese interests
- National affiliation: V7 (2015)
- National Assembly: 2 / 51

Website
- https://pertjajah.sr/

The Pertjajah Luhur (PL; English: Full of Trust) is a political party in Suriname. Founded in 1998 by Paul Somohardjo, it aims to represent Javanese Surinamese people. It traces its origins to the Pendawa Lima party founded in 1977.

== Electoral history ==
Election	Seats	Votes	+/-	Government
2000	5 / 51	14,458	▲1	Coalition
2005	6 / 51	17,127	▲1	Coalition
2010	6 / 51	30,943	0	Coalition
2015	5 / 51	19,128	▼1	Opposition
2020	2 / 51	16,623	▼3	Coalition
2025	2 / 51	10,261	0	Coalition
