= National Assembly (Suriname) =

Parliament of Suriname

Coordinates: 5°49′32″N 55°9′2″W

National Assembly De Nationale Assemblée
- 8th Surinamese National Assembly

Type
- Type: Unicameral

Leadership
- Chairman: Ashwin Adhin, NDP since 28 June 2025
- Vice-Chairman: Ronnie Brunswijk, ABOP since 28 June 2025

Structure
- Seats: 51
- Political groups: Government (34): NDP (18); ABOP (6); NPS (6); PL (2); BEP (1); A20 (1); Opposition (17): VHP (17)

Elections
- Voting system: Open list proportional representation
- Last election: 25 May 2025
- Next election: 25 May 2030

Meeting place
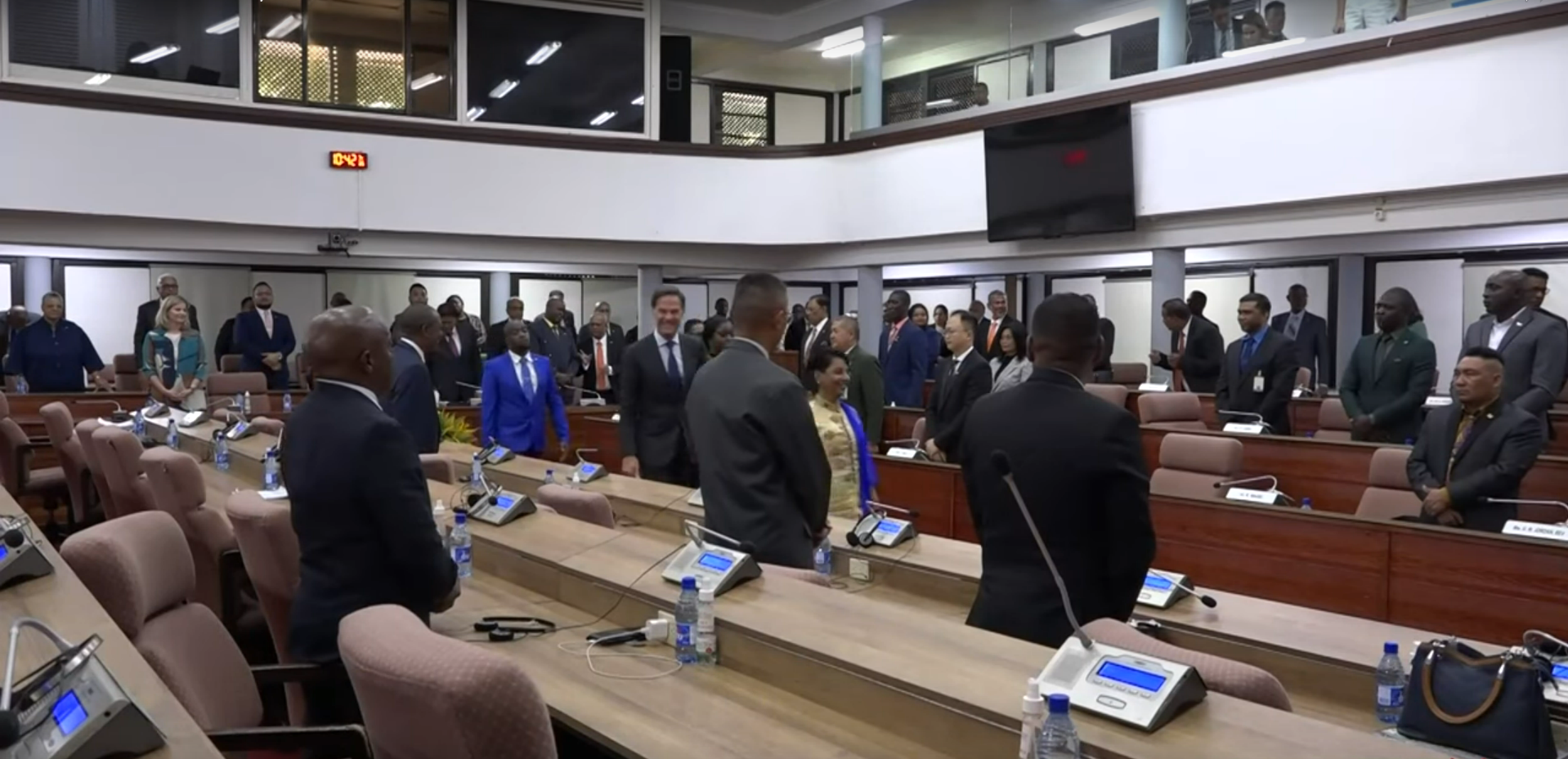
- Buiten-Sociëteit Het Park

Website
- www.dna.sr

The National Assembly (Dutch: De Nationale Assemblée, commonly abbreviated "DNA") is the Parliament, representing the legislative branch of government in Suriname. It is a unicameral legislature. The assembly has been situated in the former park house at the Independence Square in Paramaribo, after a fire destroyed the old building of representation on 1 August 1996. A reconstruction of the old building was completed in 2022.

The 51 members of parliament are elected every five years by open list proportional representation on the basis of the country's component districts. The most recent elections were held on 25 May 2025. The current Chairman of the Assembly, Marinus Bee, was appointed on 14 July 2020. Dew Sharman was appointed as Vice Chairman on 29 June 2020.

== History ==
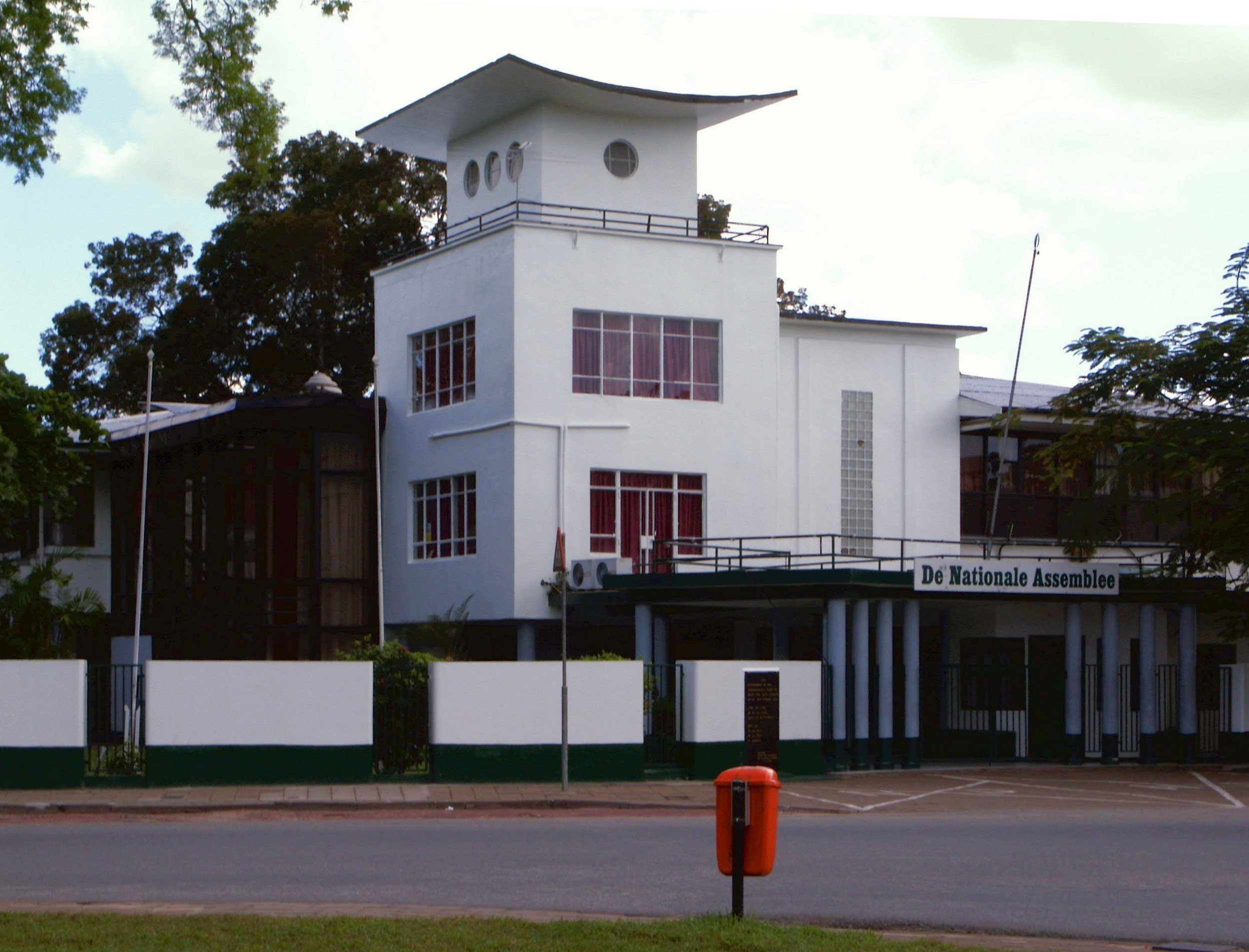
The National Assembly in Paramaribo

The first legislature of Surinam was the Colonial States, which first met in 1866. The name was changed to Estates of Suriname in 1936. When Suriname became an independent republic on 25 November 1975, the legislature was renamed the Parliament of the Republic of Suriname. Parliament was made inoperative during the coup d'état of 1980. In 1985, the Parliament was replaced by an appointed Assembly. The National Assembly, in its current form, dates from 1987. In that year, democracy was reestablished after the coup and a new constitution was adopted, organizing the Assembly, so new elections could be held on 25 November 1987. From here on, elections were held.

In some cases, a two-thirds majority is required, like the election of the President. If those votes fail, De Verenigde Volksvergadering (the United People's Assembly) is called. In those meetings, representatives from the Districts and Resorts will participate, and vote on the issue by majority.

== Chairmen since 1975 ==
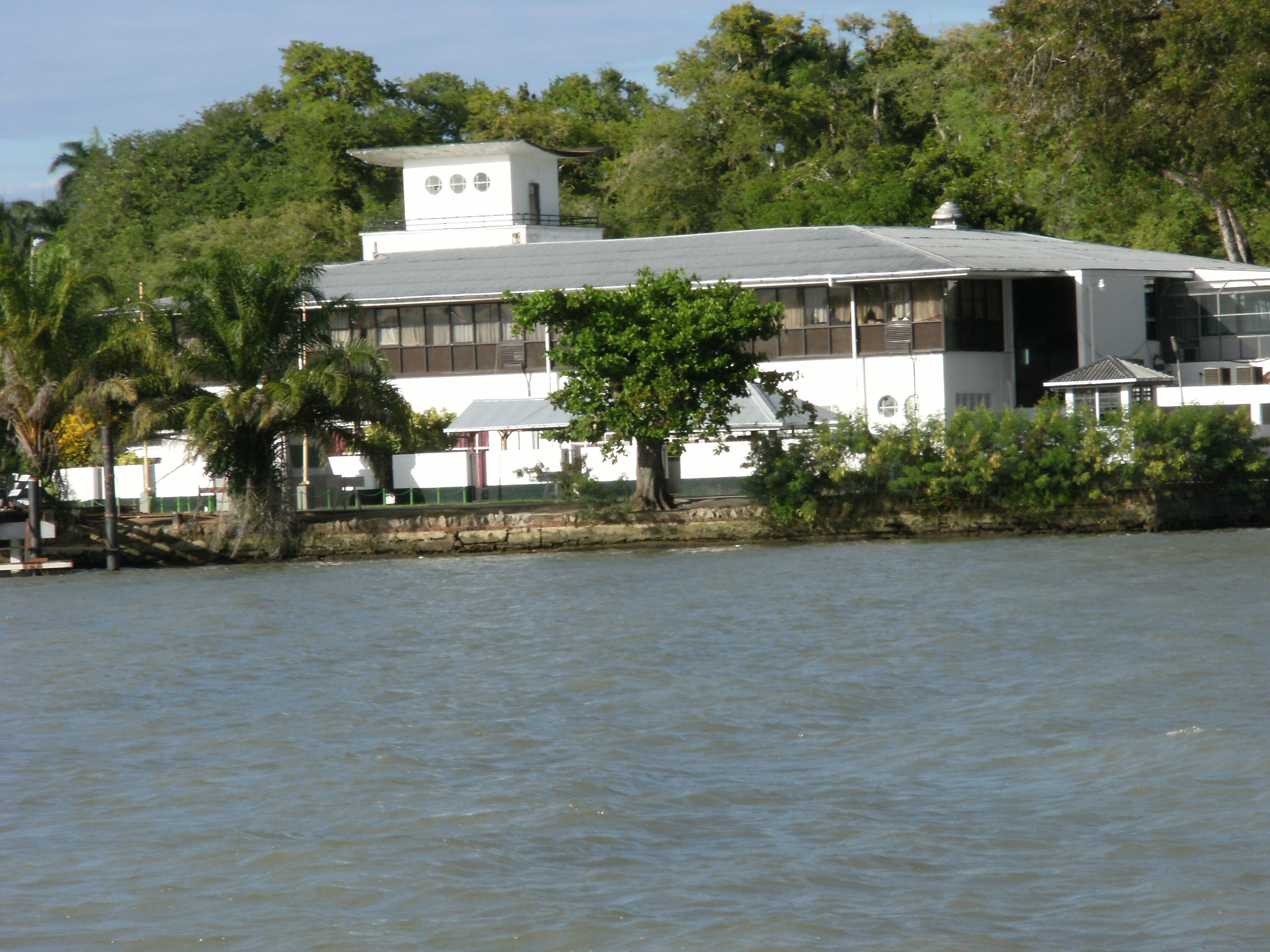
National Assembly from the Suriname River

From December 1973, Emile Wijntuin was the Chairman of the Estates of Suriname, and remained Chairman of Parliament after Independence, until it was dissolved in August 1980.

After the elections in 1987, Jagernath Lachmon (VHP) became Chairman, an office which he already had taken twice in the Estates of Suriname. Lachmon resigned in 1996, because he could not agree with the Wijdenbosch government.

On 10 October 1996, Marijke Djwalapersad (BVD) was elected as Chair, becoming the first woman in Suriname's history to assume this office. On 24 July 2000, Djwalapersad was succeeded by Jagernath Lachmon, who remained in office until his death in 2001. His fellow party man Ramdien Sardjoe took his place.

After the elections of 2005, Paul Somohardjo of Pertjajah Luhur (a party that was part of the New Front combination) wanted to become Vice President of Suriname. This did not seem feasible, since he was convicted in August 2003 for defamation, which resulted in a suspended two-month sentence and his removal as minister. Within the coalition was decided to make Ramdien Sardjoe vice president and Somohardjo Chairman of the National Assembly.

On 30 June 2005, Somohardjo was elected to the proposed office with 29 out of 50 votes. Caprino Alendy (BEP/A-Combination) was elected as vice-Chairman, with the same number of votes.

On 30 June 2010, Jennifer Simons of Dési Bouterse's NDP/MC surprisingly won the office from Somohardjo, with 26 votes against 24 votes, and became the incumbent Chair of the Assembly. Ruth Wijdenbosch was elected as Vice Chair with 25 votes, one more than her rival, Anton Paal (PALU/MC). Remarkable is the fact that this is the first time that these offices are held by opposing politicians. It is also the first time that both offices are held by women.

On 29 June 2020, Ronnie Brunswijk was elected as Chairperson of the National Assembly in an uncontested election. Dew Sharman was elected as Vice Chairperson. After Brunswijk was elected Vice President of Suriname on 13 July 2020, Marinus Bee was installed as his successor on 14 July 2020.

== Composition ==
In the elections of 25 May 2025, the 51 parliamentary seats were allocated as follows: Initial results showed that no party obtained a majority in the National Assembly, with the NDP winning 18 seats followed by the ruling VHP at 17. The remaining 16 seats were won by smaller parties. Turnout was estimated to be at least 58%. On 27 May, the NDP announced that it had finalized a coalition agreement with the General Liberation and Development Party, the National Party of Suriname, Pertjajah Luhur, Alternative 2020 and the Brotherhood and Unity in Politics. The coalition had enough votes to elect Jennifer Geerlings-Simons as Suriname's first female president. Between them, the parties in the NDP-led coalition have 34 seats, exactly the two-thirds supermajority required to elect a president without the need for support from other parties.

On 3 July, the VHP said that it would not put forward a candidate against Geerlings-Simons. At the time, she had been the only person to lodge her candidacy. As expected, Geerlings-Simons was elected unopposed as president on 6 with NPS leader Gregory Rusland as vice president.

Party	Votes	%	Seats	+/–
National Democratic Party	93,459	34.18	18	+2
Progressive Reform Party	86,912	31.78	17	−3
General Liberation and Development Party	31,798	11.63	6	−2
National Party of Suriname	31,215	11.42	6	+3
Pertjajah Luhur	10,300	3.77	2	0
Alternative 2020	7,461	2.73	1	+1
Brotherhood and Unity in Politics	7,128	2.61	1	−1
Option for Suriname	1,634	0.60	0	0
Democratic Alternative '91	1,537	0.56	0	0
The New Lion	649	0.24	0	0
Arena Political Party	517	0.19	0	0
People's Party for a Livable Suriname	339	0.12	0	New
Democratic Union of Suriname	335	0.12	0	0
Party of Communication	160	0.06	0	New
Total	273,444	100.00	51	0
Valid votes	273,444	98.57		
Invalid/blank votes	3,961	1.43		
Total votes	277,405	100.00		
Registered voters/turnout	399,932	69.36		
Source: Centraal Hoofdstembureau

=== Results by district ===
Results by district (preliminary)
District	NDP		VHP		ABOP		NPS		PL		A20		BEP		Others		Total
District	#	%	#	%	#	%	#	%	#	%	#	%	#	%	#	%	Total
Brokopondo	2,753	45.98%	45	0.75%	1,193	19.93%	811	13.55%	1	0.02%	34	0.57%	1,091	18.22%	59	0.99%	5,987
Commewijne	5,804	31.63%	6,847	37.31%	1,349	7.35%	1,189	6.48%	2,201	11.99%	399	2.17%	112	0.61%	450	2.45%	18,351
Coronie	813	55.72%	102	6.99%	52	3.56%	399	27.35%	26	1.78%	22	1.51%	3	0.21%	42	2.88%	1,459
Marowijne	2,292	20.12%	418	3.67%	7,695	67.57%	373	3.28%	53	0.47%	121	1.06%	375	3.29%	62	0.54%	11,389
Nickerie	5,484	30.29%	9,716	53.66%	479	2.65%	862	4.76%	1,069	5.90%	126	0.70%	81	0.45%	289	1.60%	18,106
Para	8,308	56.08%	1,395	9.42%	1,668	11.26%	2,020	13.63%	347	2.34%	513	3.46%	320	2.16%	244	1.65%	14,815
Paramaribo	40,465	37.00%	29,868	27.31%	9,986	9.13%	18,014	16.47%	2,657	2.43%	4,062	3.71%	1,910	1.75%	2,408	2.20%	109,370
Saramacca	3,828	37.14%	5,078	49.27%	338	3.28%	358	3.47%	357	3.46%	188	1.82%	8	0.08%	151	1.47%	10,306
Sipaliwini	4,930	42.69%	232	2.01%	3,189	27.62%	1,121	9.71%	5	0.04%	61	0.53%	1,815	15.72%	195	1.69%	11,548
Wanica	18,601	25.98%	33,087	46.22%	5,777	8.07%	5,978	8.35%	3,545	4.95%	1,919	2.68%	1,396	1.95%	1,284	1.79%	71,587

== See also ==
- Chairman of the National Assembly of Suriname
- List of Chairmen of the Estates of Suriname
- Politics of Suriname
- List of legislatures by country
