= Andrea Pochak =

Argentine lawyer

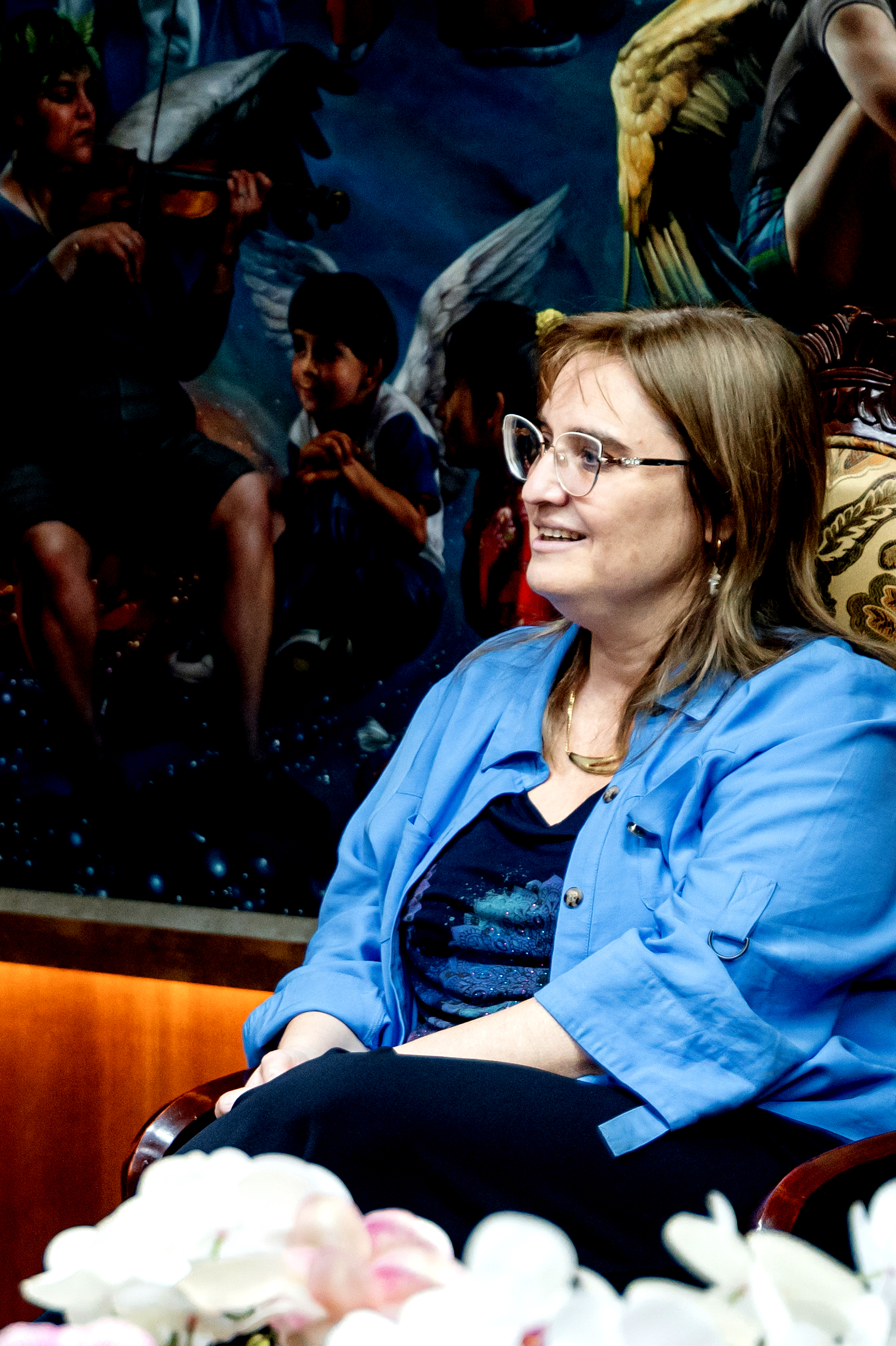
- in 2026
- Occupation: human rights lawyer
- Known for: Inter-American Commission on Human Rights commissioner

Andrea Pochak is an Argentine lawyer. She was elected to serve on the Inter-American Commission on Human Rights (IAHCR) from January 2024 through to the end of 2027 and to be the OAS's Rapporteur on Human Mobility.

== Life ==
Pochak qualified as a lawyer and took a strong interest in human rights. She was the General Director of Human Rights in the Public Prosecutor's Office.

In 2022, she was working for the Secretary of Human Rights of Argentina as a "Subsecretary of Protection and International Relations on Human Rights".

Argentina proposed that she should be a candidate to be elected to be one of the Inter-American Commission on Human Rights (IACHR)'s commissioners. As part of the process, an independent panel led by Claudia Martin of the American University Washington College of Law looked at all of the prospective candidates to be one of the four new IACHR members. The panel was concerned that four candidates were withdrawn, however, Pochak was considered to be acceptable as a candidate after they investigated her human rights standards and her "independence, impartiality, and absence of conflicts".

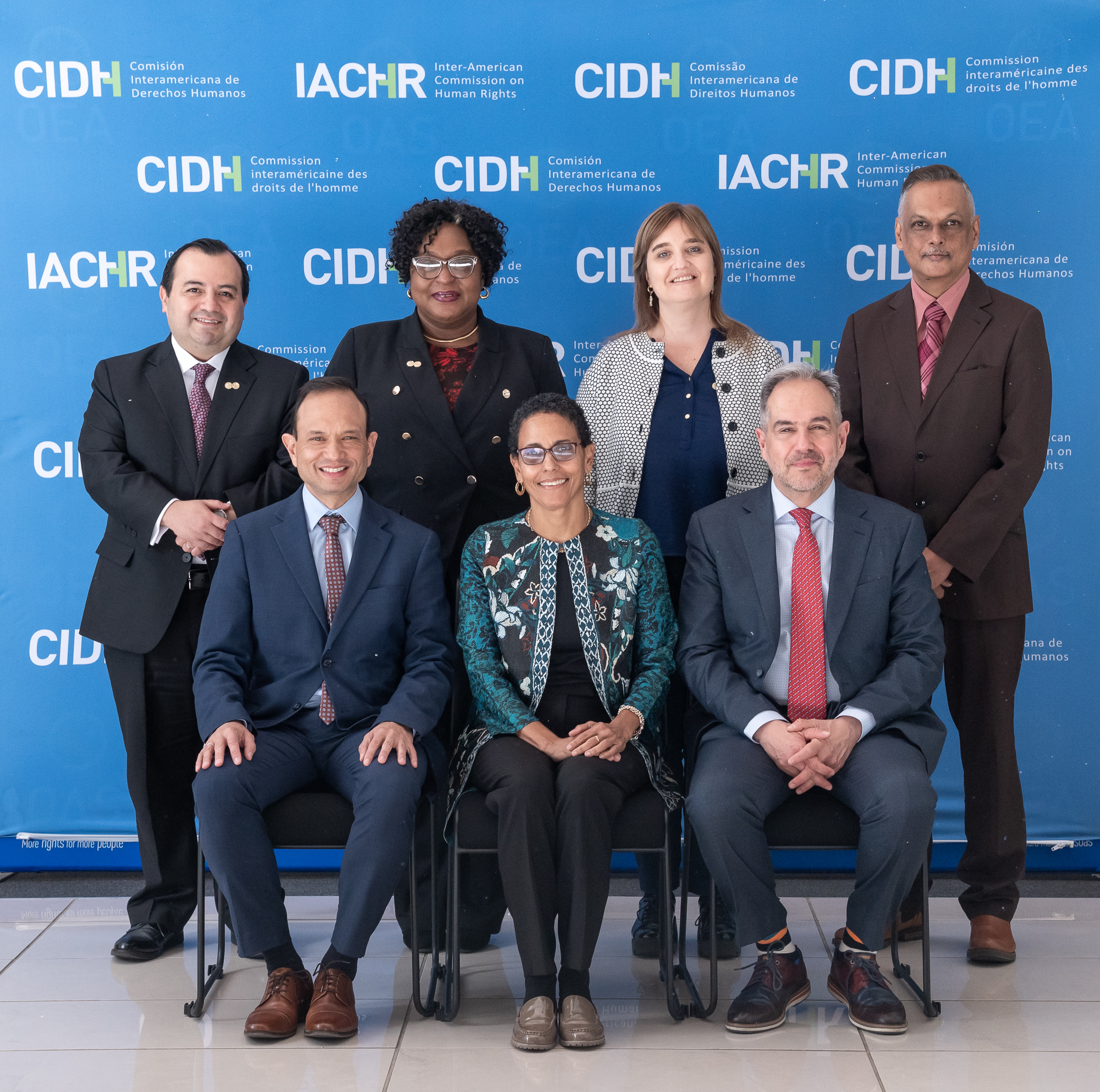
The 2024 IACHR Panel led by Clarke

In 2024 new IACHR commissioners were elected, including Gloria de Mees and Pochak, to replace long-serving commissioners: the Jamaican Margarette May Macaulay, Julissa Mantilla Falcón and the Panamanian Esmeralda Arosemena de Troitiño. The initial President of the Inter-American Commission on Human Rights (IACHR) was Roberta Clarke.

Pochak took over the role of Rapporteur on Human Mobility from a previous commissioner José Luis Caballero Ochoa. The job is to look at human mobility and report to the OAS.

In March 2026 she became the first vice President of the OHCR when Stuardo Ralón Orellana became the President.

The Center for Justice and International Law (CEJIL) issued a statement in July 2026 in support of Pochak following accusations by an organisation that she had a conflict of interest regarding a case being considered by the IACHR. The letter was signed by a considerable number of ex-Presidents of the IACHR and rapporteurs including Roberta Clarke, Julissa Mantilla Falcón, Antonia Urrejola and Margarette May Macaulay.
