= Roberta Clarke =

Barbadian lawyer

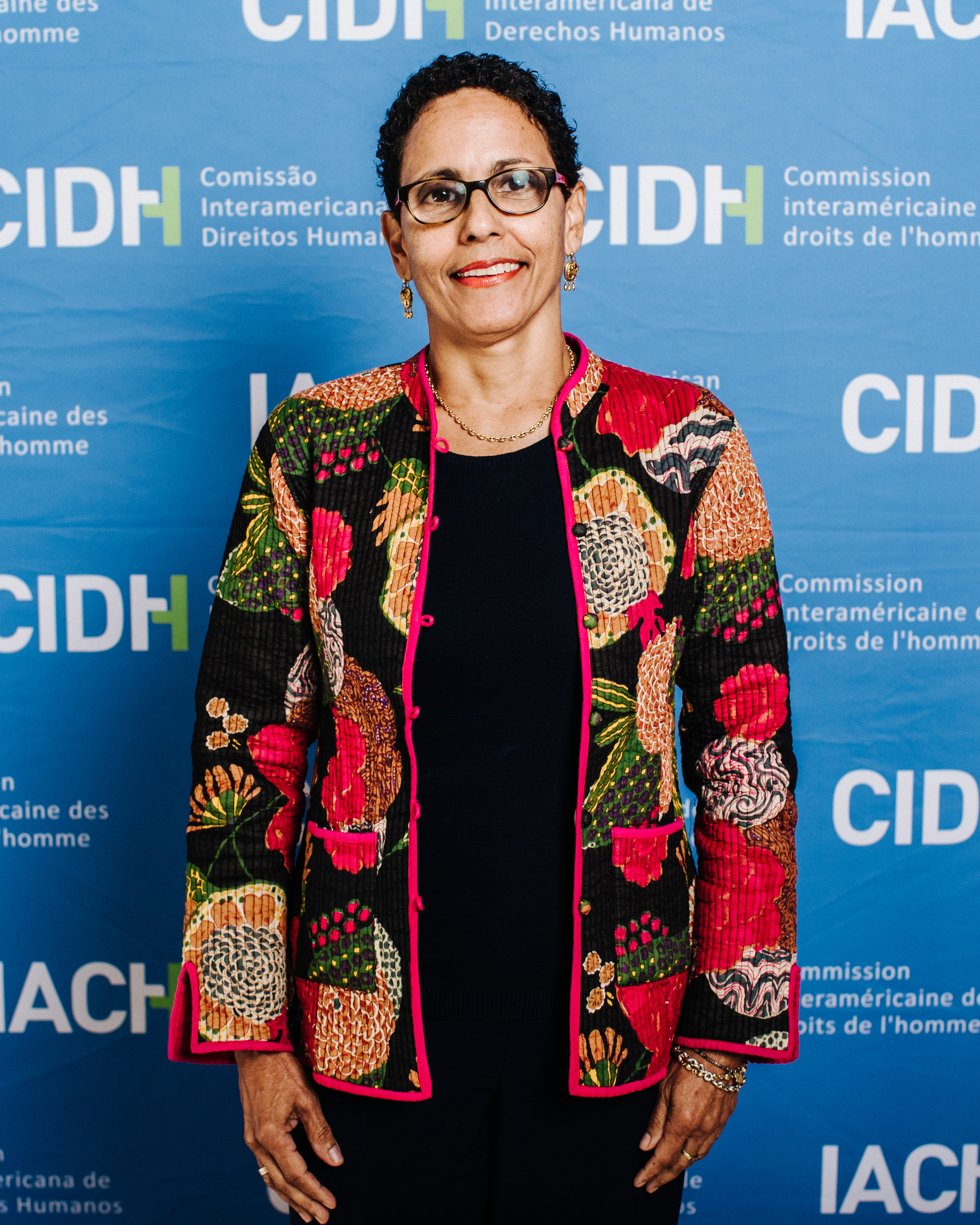
- Education: Hugh Wooding Law School
- Occupation: lawyer
- Employer: Inter-American Commission on Human Rights (IACHR)
- Known for: Commissioner of the Inter-American Commission on Human Rights
- Predecessor: Flávia Piovesan

Roberta Clarke is a Barbadian lawyer who has worked for UN Women. She was elected as a commissioner for the Inter-American Commission on Human Rights to serve for four years from 2022.

== Life ==
Clarke was born on Barbados and after training as a lawyer she practised on Trinidad and Tobago. She then went to work for the United Nations where she worked in the Caribbean, Libya, East and Southern Africa and in the Asia Pacific.

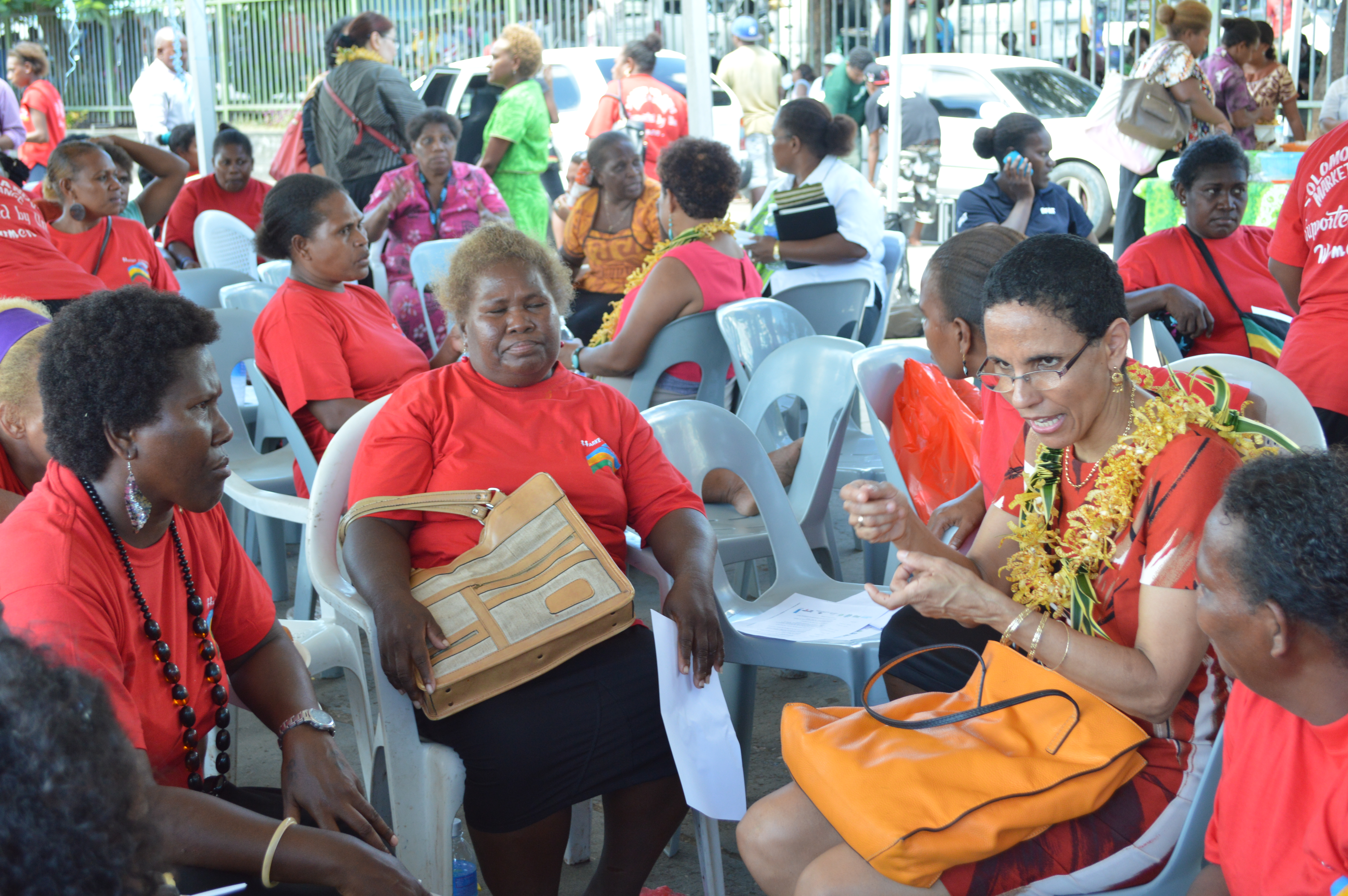
Clarke in Honiara in the Solomon Islands working for UN Women in 2014

In 2014 she was UN Women's Regional Director for Asia and the Pacific and the Representative in Thailand.

She was elected as one of the seven commissioners for the Inter-American Commission on Human Rights in January 2022 at the University of California in Los Angeles (UCLA). She was elected for a four-year term. There were five candidates for the three vacant positions as commissioners and the other two successful candidates were from Mexico and Colombia. She had the support of Barbados's Ministry of Foreign Affairs and its Permanent Mission to the Organization of American States (OAS).

She became the Second Vice President of the IACHR commission. The President was the Jamaican Margarette May Macaulay and the first vice President was Esmeralda Arosemena de Troitiño from Panama. This was one of the first times that the commission was led by an all woman team and the first time that they all came from Central America or the Caribbean. Clarke succeeded Flávia Piovesan as the commission's Rapporteur on the Rights of Lesbian, Gay, Trans, Bisexual, and Intersex Persons.

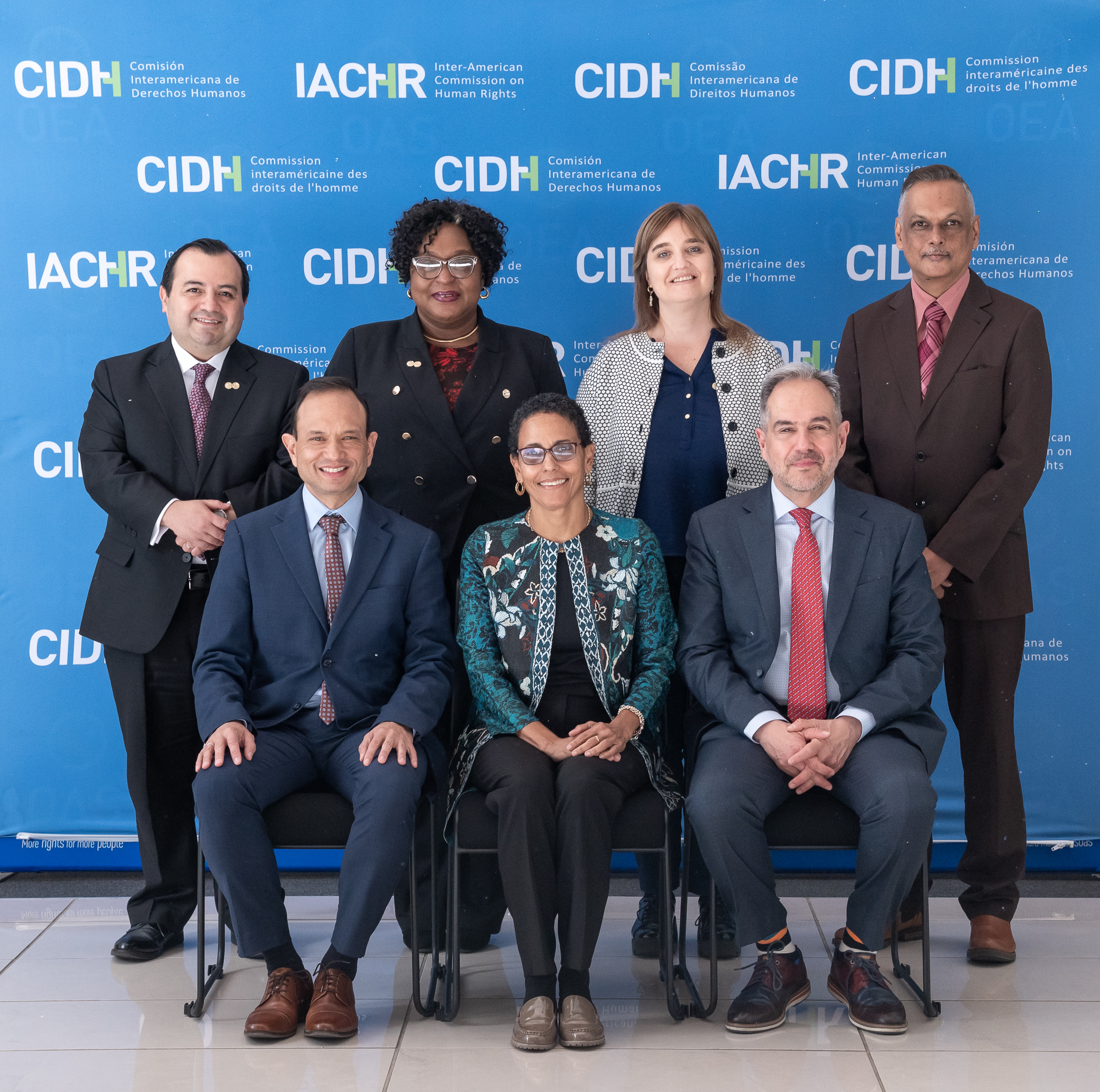
The 2024 IACHR Panel led by Clarke

In 2024 new IACHR commissioners were elected, including Gloria de Mees and Andrea Pochak, to replace long serving commissioners Macauley, Julissa Mantilla Falcón and Esmeralda Arosemena de Troitiño. The initial President of the Inter-American Commission on Human Rights (IACHR) was Clarke.

She is a campaigner for women's rights and she has been President of the Coalition against Domestic Violence in Trinidad and Tobago.
