= Gloria de Mees =

Surinamese professor and OAS Rapporteur

Gloria Monique de Mees
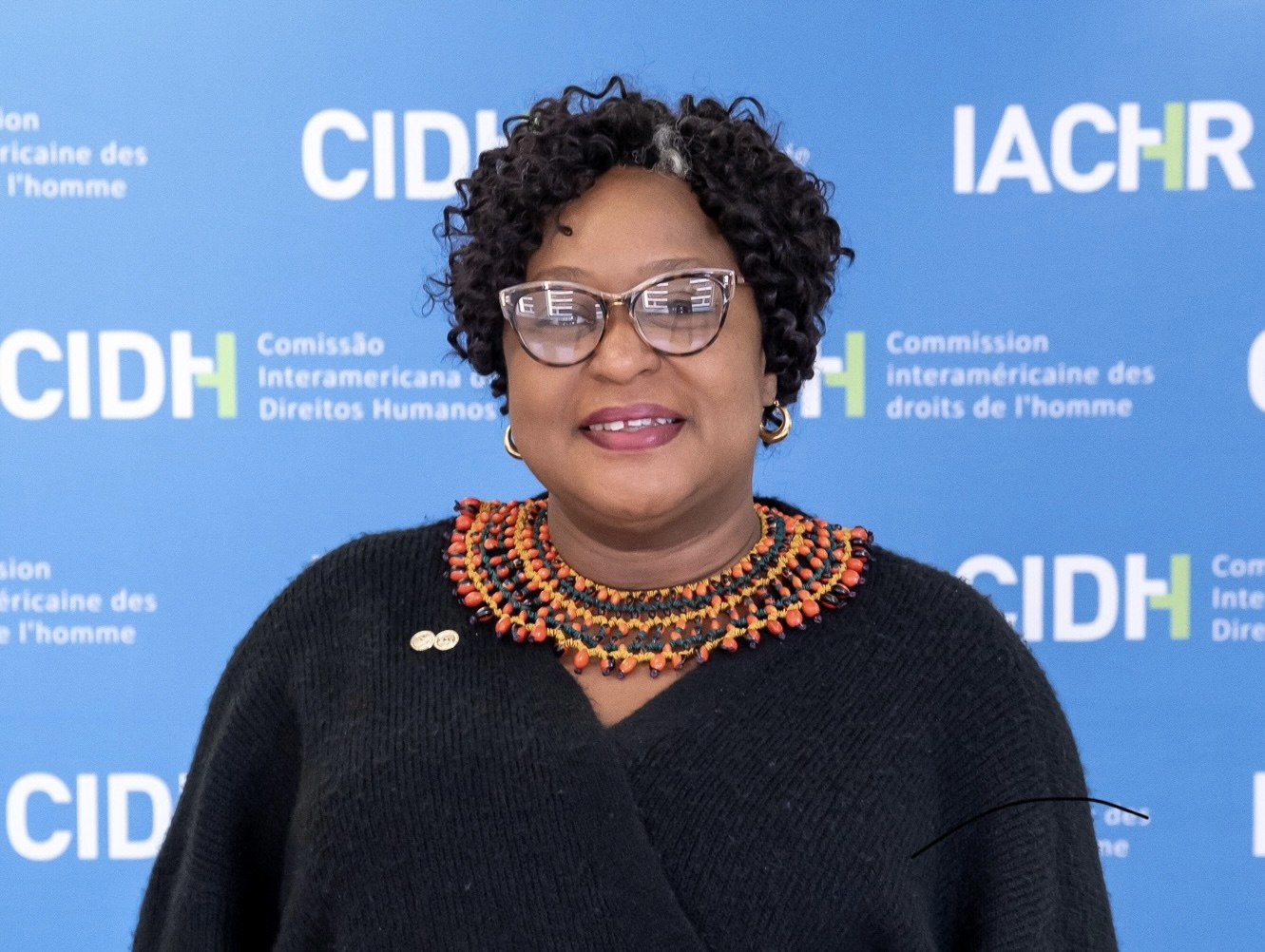
- Mees in 2024
- Born: Paramaribo
- Employer: Anton de Kom University of Suriname

Gloria Monique de Mees is a Suriname professor who became OAS's Rapporteur on the Rights of Afro-Descendants and against Racial Discrimination. She was elected to serve on the Inter-American Commission on Human Rights (IAHCR) from 2024 through to the end of 2027.

== Life ==
Mees was born in Suriname's capital Paramaribo, and graduated with a master's degree in law from the Anton de Kom University of Suriname in 2000.

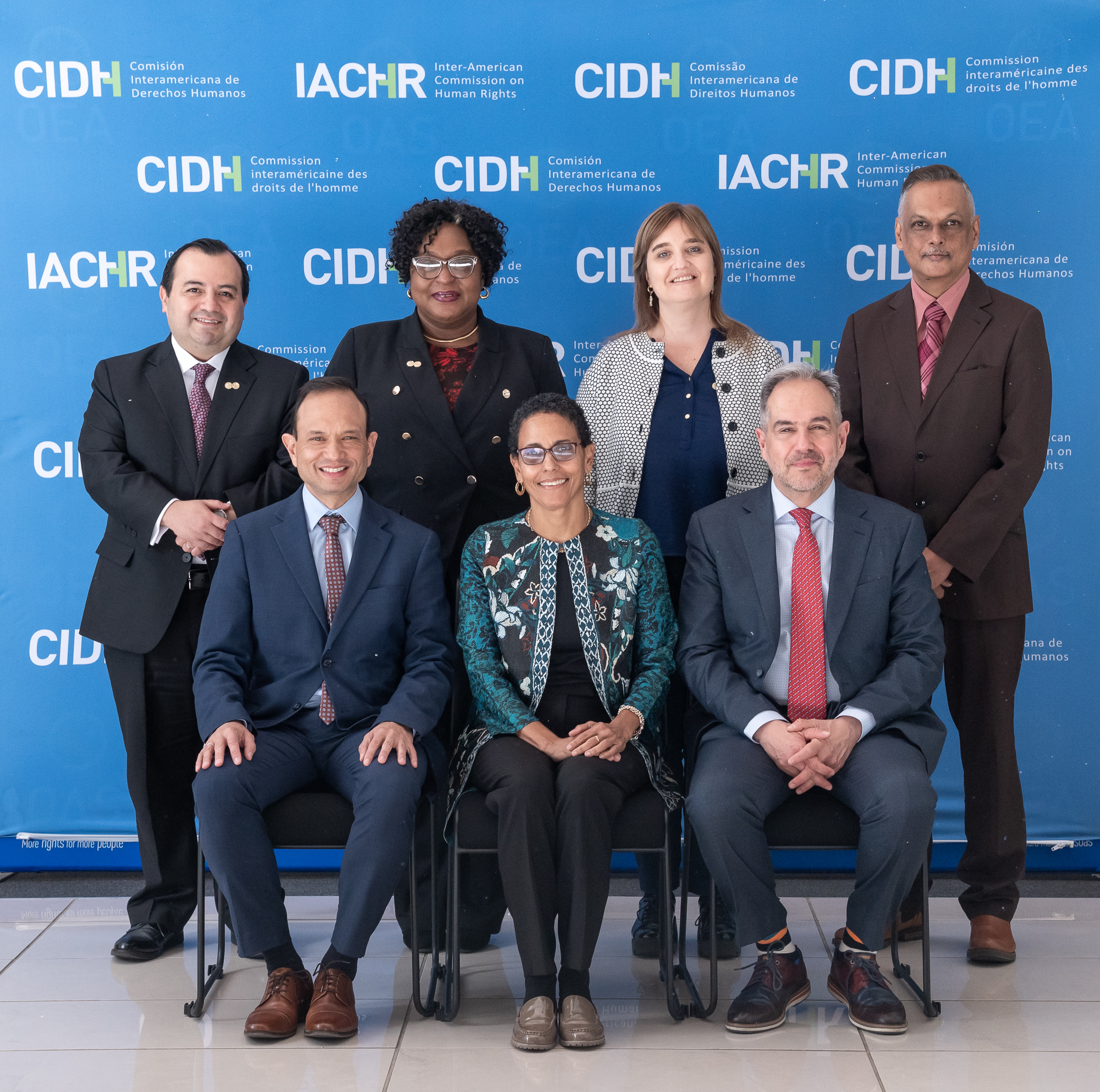
The 2024 IACHR Panel

She worked at the Anton de Kom University of Suriname lecturing on human rights law. Her country proposed that she should be a candidate to be elected to the IACHR. As part of the process an independent panel led by Claudia Martin of the American University Washington College of Law looked at all of the prospective candidates in a year when there would be four new IACHR members. The panel were concerned that so many of the candidates were withdrawn. Some of those elected met the criteria, but de Mees failed to meet expertise with the IACHR human rights standards and the panel questioned her "independence, impartiality, and absence of conflicts".

She was elected by the OAS's General assembly to serve from the beginning of 2024 through to the end of 2027. She succeeded the Jamaican lawyer Margarette May Macaulay as the Rapporteur on Rights of Women and Rapporteur on the Rights of People of African Descent and against Racial Discrimination. She was one of three new commissioners, including Andrea Pochak, replacing long serving commissioners Macauley, Julissa Mantilla Falcón and Esmeralda Arosemena de Troitiño. The initial President of the Inter-American Commission on Human Rights (IACHR) will be Roberta Clarke who is a commissioner from Trinidad.
