= Emilio Álvarez Icaza =

Mexican senator and sociologist

Emilio Álvarez Icaza Longoria
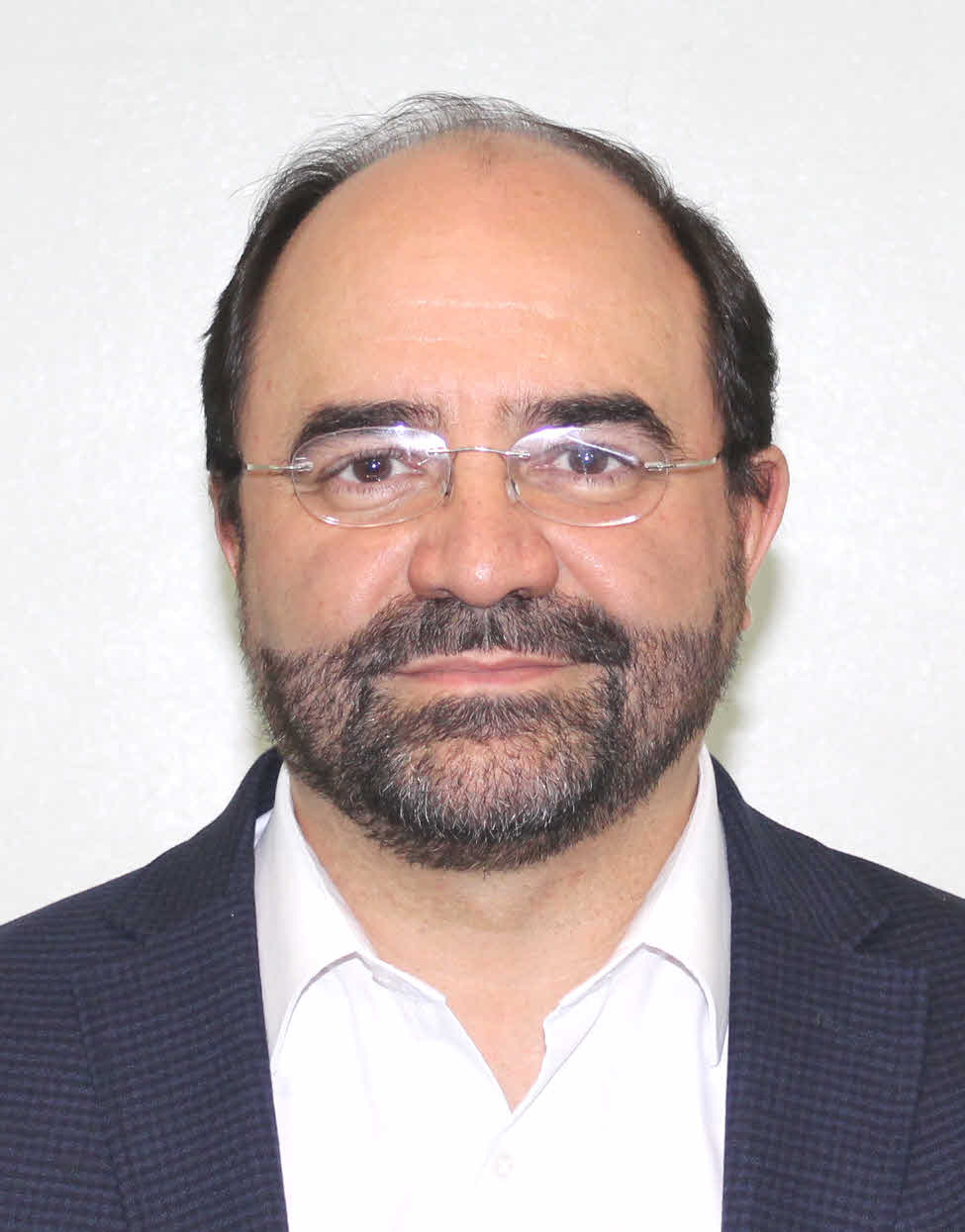

Senator of the Congress of the Union from Mexico City
- In office 1 September 2018 – 31 August 2024 Serving with Martí Batres and Citlalli Hernández
- Preceded by: Pablo Escudero Morales
- Succeeded by: Cynthia López Castro

Personal details
- Born: 31 March 1965 (age 61) Mexico City, Mexico
- Party: Independent
- Other political affiliations: Somos México
- Education: Universidad Nacional Autónoma de México
- Occupation: Human rights activist and ombudsman, professor

Emilio Álvarez Icaza Longoria (born 31 March 1965) is a Mexican human rights ombudsman and activist serving as a senator in the LXIV Legislature of the Mexican Congress from Mexico City. He previously served as the president of the Inter-American Commission on Human Rights.

== Life and political career ==
Álvarez Icaza was born on 31 March 1965 in Mexico City, Mexico. Álvarez Icaza holds a degree in sociology from the National Autonomous University of Mexico (UNAM) and a master's degree in social sciences from the Latin American Social Sciences Institute. From 1986 to 1988 and from 1990 to 1999, he worked at the Centro Nacional de Comunicación Social, becoming its leader from August 1994 to January 1999.

In 1999, he became one of the first electoral councilors of the new Instituto Electoral del Distrito Federal. Two years later, he was elected to head the Human Rights Commission of the Federal District (CDHDF), serving two four-year terms.

Álvarez Icaza has taught graduate courses at various schools, including the UNAM, Universidad Iberoamericana, and the Center for Humanities Teaching and Studies of the State of Morelos. Álvarez Icaza is also a member of the Movement for Peace with Justice and Dignity, who were organizers of the main protests during the 15 October Movement.

=== President of the IACHR ===
On 19 July 2012, Álvarez Icaza was chosen to be the executive secretary of the Inter-American Commission on Human Rights (IACHR) for a four-year term, taking the post on 16 August. While serving on the IACHR, the Procuraduría General de la República opened an investigation against him for alleged misuse of funds given by the Mexican government to the IACHR to finance its activities relating to the Ayotzinapa mass disappearance; the investigation was ultimately abandoned.

In 2016, he was replaced by Paulo Abrão of Brazil.

=== Ahora movement and presidential bid ===
On 27 February 2017, Álvarez Icaza announced he was launching a political movement in Mexico City, known as Ahora (Now), initially intending to put citizen candidates on the ballot in 2018 and as a vehicle for an independent presidential bid. That October, citing the outcome of the State of Mexico election earlier that year, he withdrew his candidacy, worried that the election had been too similar to that of 1988 and declaring that he "would not be useful to the PRI," like other independent candidates who he claimed had their candidacies secretly supported by the presidency.

=== 2018 Senate candidacy ===
In March 2018, Álvarez Icaza announced that Ahora would back the Por México al Frente coalition, including presidential candidate Ricardo Anaya Cortés, and that the movement would run legislative candidates in the coalition, with three candidates for the Senate and five for the Chamber of Deputies. Álvarez joined the PAN-PRD-MC Senate ticket for Mexico City alongside Xóchitl Gálvez. The ticket finished second in the election, giving Álvarez a seat as the first minority senator.

On 23 August 2018, Álvarez Icaza announced he would serve as an independent senator and not join the caucuses of any of the parties that ran him for Senate, noting that he is not a member of any of them; additionally, the other Ahora candidates elected, Ana Lucía Riojas Martínez and Carlos Morales Vázquez, would enter the legislature as independents, though they ran on the PRD and PAN lists, respectively.

== Personal life ==
Álvarez Icaza is married and has three children.
