= María Claudia Pulido =

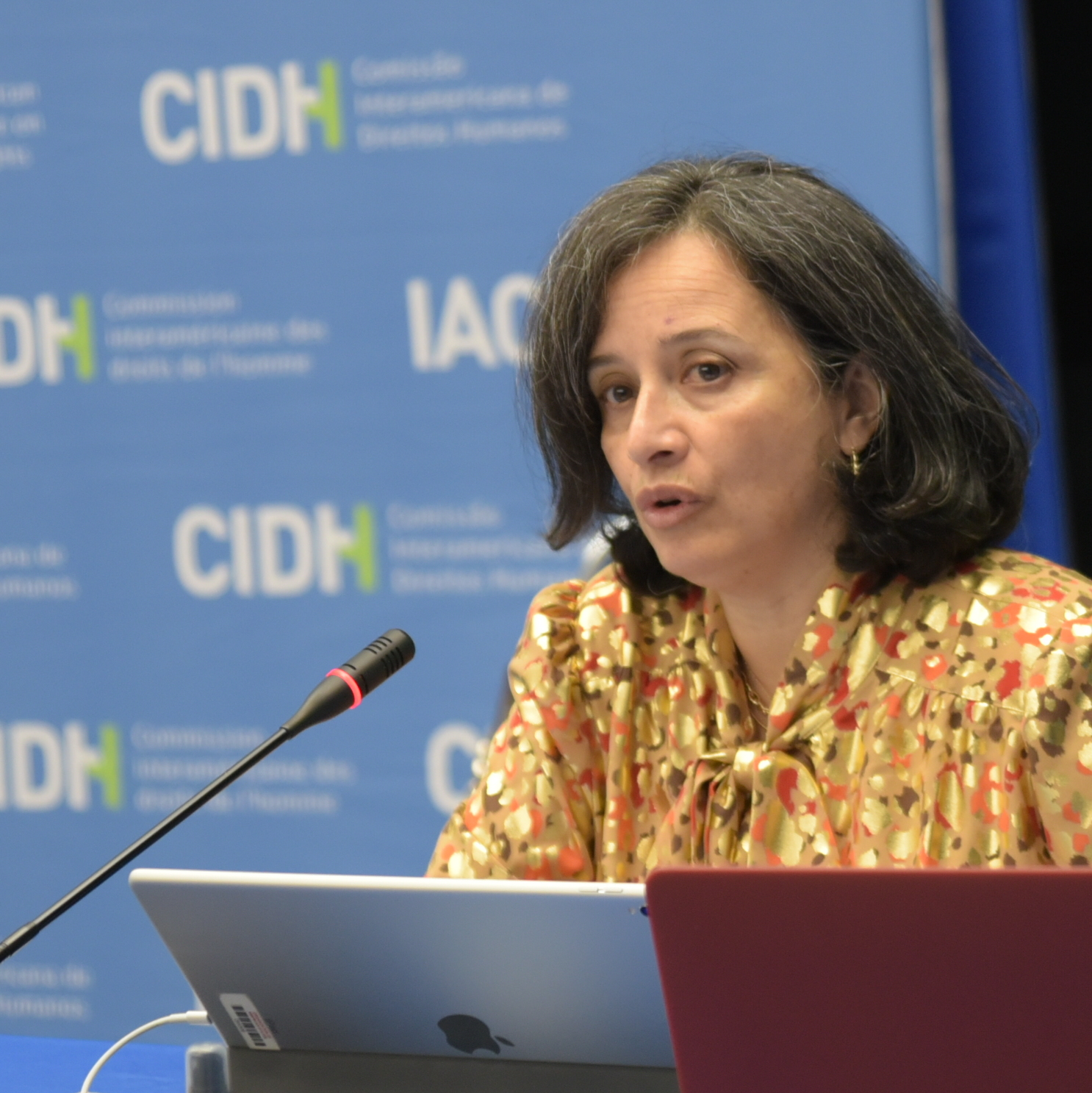

Executive Secretary of the Inter-American Commission on Human Rights
- In office 17 August 2020 – 1 June 2021
- Preceded by: Paulo Abrão
- Succeeded by: Tania Reneaum

Personal details
- Education: Universidad Externado de Colombia; Washington College of Law

María Claudia Pulido is a Colombian human rights lawyer who served as Acting Executive Secretary of the Inter-American Commission on Human Rights (IACHR) from 17 August 2020 to 1 June 2021. She succeeded Paulo Abrão after Organization of American States Secretary General Luis Almagro announced that he would not renew Abrão's contract as Executive Secretary of the IACHR.

She was succeeded by Tania Reneaum of Mexico.
