= Margarette May Macaulay =

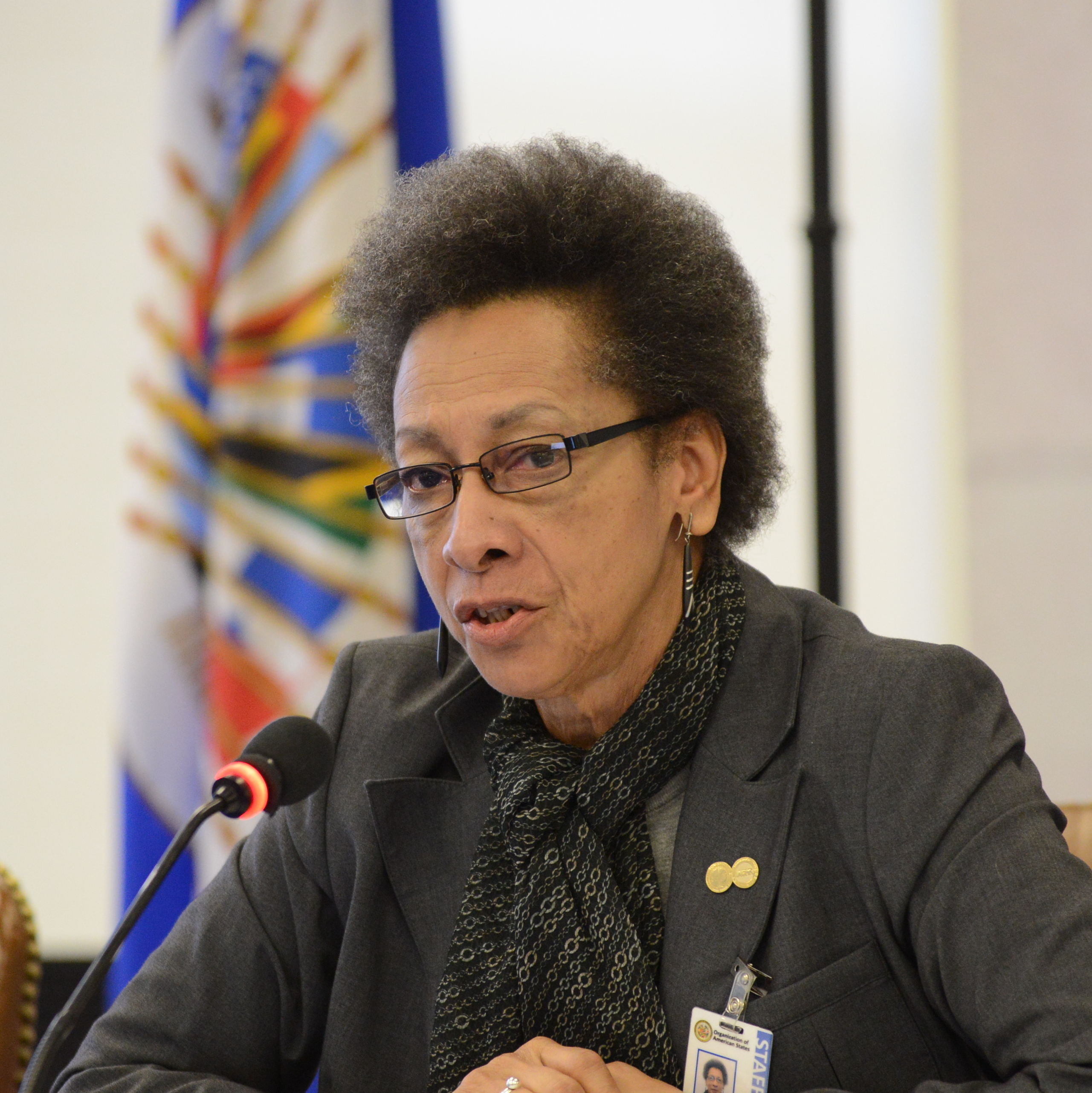
- Born: Africa
- Occupation: Lawyer
- Known for: Commissioner of the Inter-American Commission on Human Rights

Margarette May Macaulay (born 20th century) is the Jamaican Commissioner and two-time President of the Inter-American Commission on Human Rights (OAS).

== Life ==
Macaulay was born in West Africa and is of Czech-German, Dominican-French-Creole, and Sierra Leone heritage. She passed her law degree at the University of London, Holborn College. She then moved with her husband and young daughter, Berette, from Sierra Leone to Jamaica.

Macaulay has worked as a professional and academic in the area of human rights, particularly in the field of the rights of children and women. She is a recognized expert in the fight against gender violence. She has also worked for the abolition of the death penalty in the Caribbean region, environmental rights and for the land rights of indigenous peoples.

She was judge of the Inter-American Court of Human Rights between 2007 and 2012 where she contributed to the formulation of the Rules of Procedure of the Court.

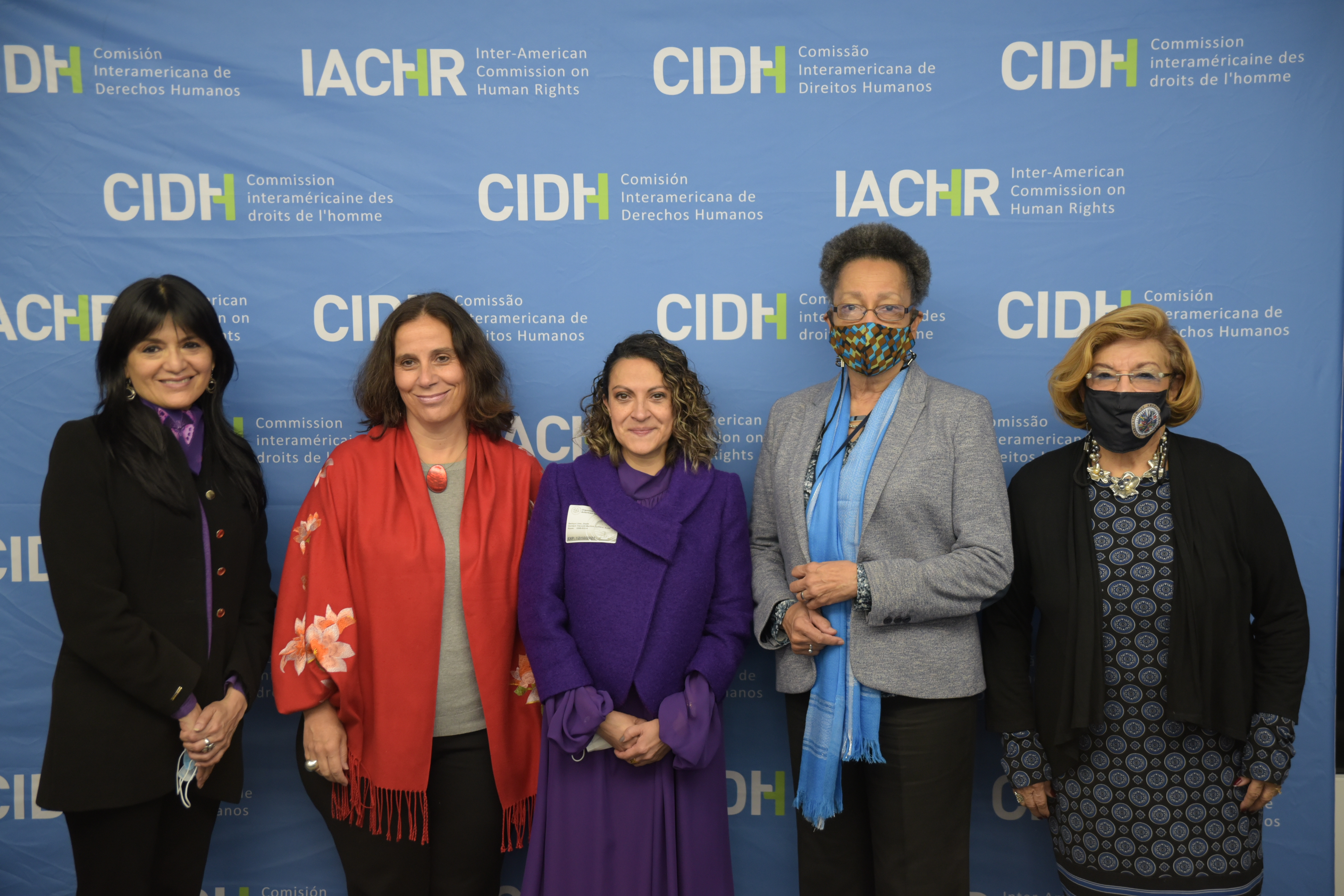
5 leaders on human-rights. L to R: Julissa Mantilla Falcón, Antonia Urrejola Noguera, Jineth Bedoya Lima, Macaulay and Esmeralda Arosemena de Troitiño at the Inter-American Commission on Human Rights in Washington DC in 2021

Macauley was elected as a member of the IACHR by the OAS General Assembly in 2015 to replace Francisco Eguiguren of Peru. She was the Rapporteur for Antigua and Barbuda, Bahamas, Dominica, the United States, El Salvador and Saint Kitts and Nevis. She was the Rapporteur on Rights of Women and Rapporteur on the Rights of People of African Descent and against Racial Discrimination through 2023 when she was succeeded by Gloria Monique de Mees.

Macaulay was elected commissioner of the Inter-American Commission on Human Rights (IACHR) by the OAS General Assembly for a period of four years, from January 1, 2016, to December 31, 2019. She was the President of the IACHR in 2018. In 2023 she was again elected President with Esmeralda Arosemena de Troitiño as first vice president and Roberta Clarke of Barbados as the second.
