= Soledad García Muñoz =

Spanish lawyer

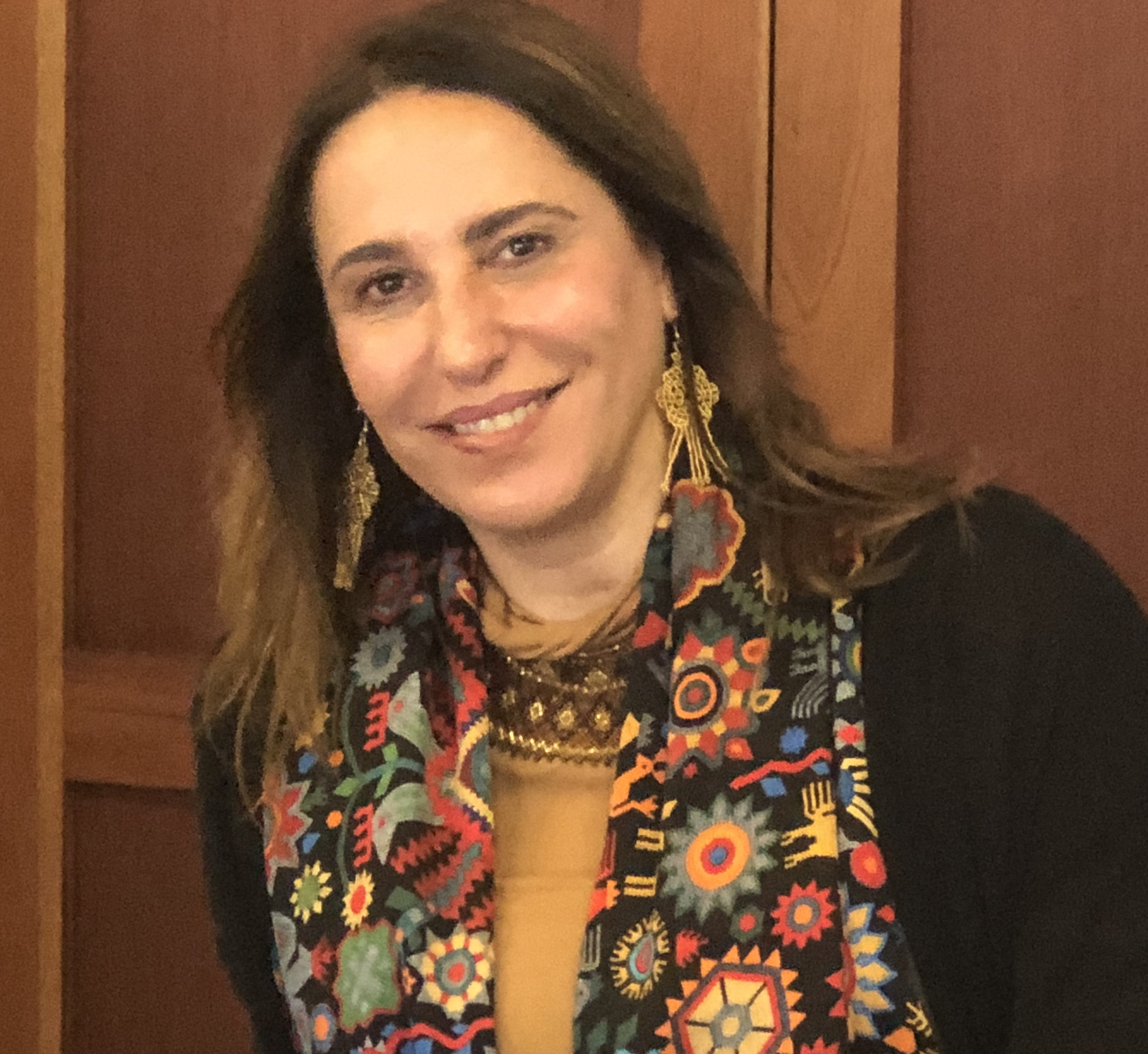
- in 2018
- Born: 1969 (age 56–57); Arenas de San Pedro, Spain
- Occupation: lawyer
- Known for: Special Rapporteur on economic, social, culture, and environmental Rights serving on the Inter-American Commission on Human Rights

Soledad García Muñoz is a Spanish lawyer who in 2017 was elected as first Special Rapporteur on economic, social, culture, and environmental Rights serving on the Inter-American Commission on Human Rights.

== Life ==
Muñoz was born in Arenas de San Pedro, Castile and León, Spain, in 1969. She graduated in law from the CEU Luis Vives of the University of Alcalá de Henares in 1992 and graduated in advanced studies in human rights from the Charles III University of Madrid in 2004. She began her career as a lawyer in Madrid from 1993 to 1998.

In 1998 she moved to Argentina to become the president of Amnesty International in Argentina. She became vice-chair of Amnesty International's international executive committee and chair of its Working Group on Gender and Diversity.

She was a professor in the Faculty of Legal and Social Sciences of the University of La Plata and their Gender and Women's Human Rights Coordinator. In 2004, she launched Amnesty International's campaign, "It's in our hands, no more violence against women".

She was coordinator of the CEDAW-Argentina Project of the Inter-American Institute of Human Rights (IIDH), member of the Group of Experts on Progress Indicators of Women's Human Rights, of the Inter-American Commission of Women (CIM). From 2009 to 2017, she was in charge of the Regional Office for South America of the Inter-American Institute of Human Rights (IIDH) based in Montevideo.

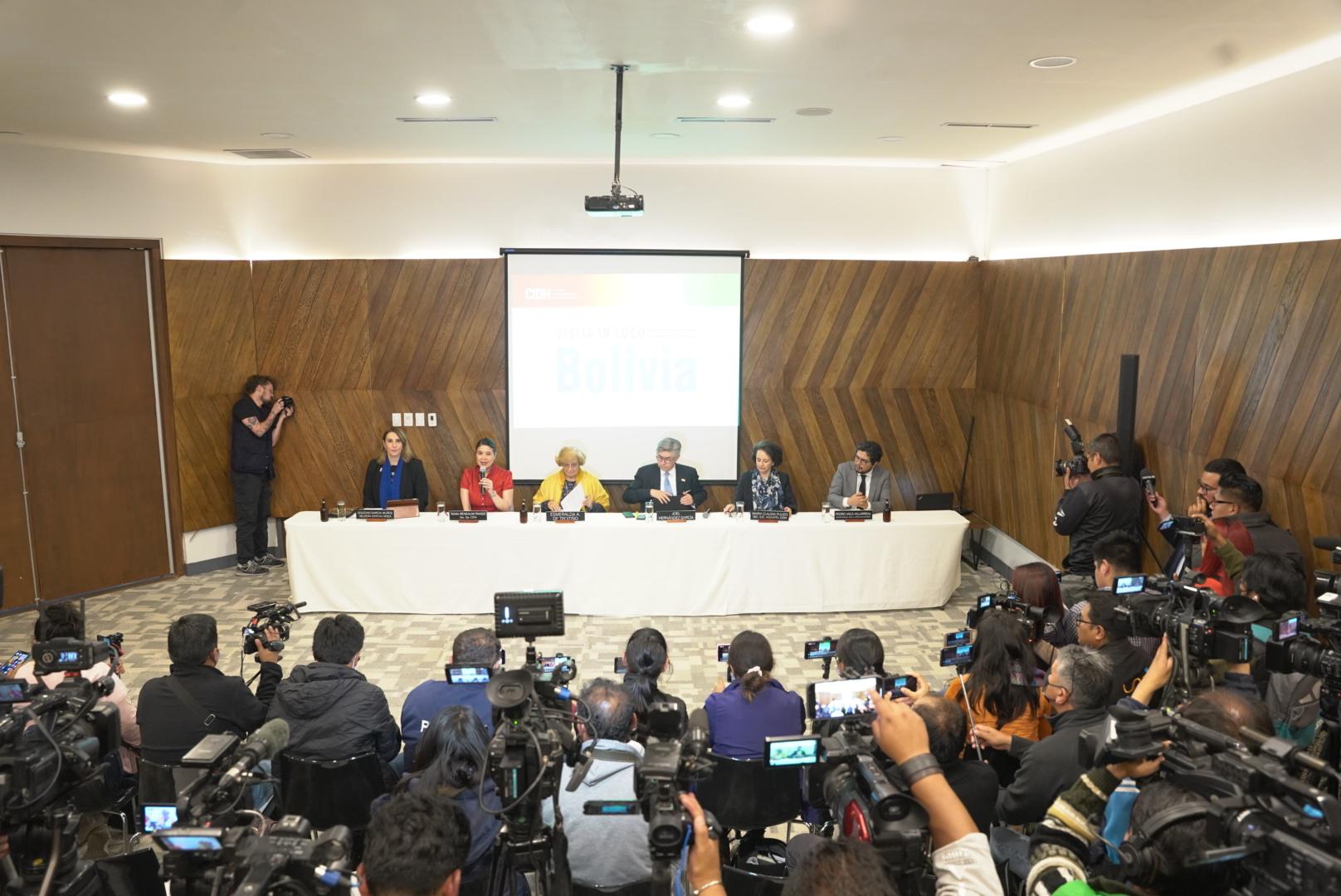
(On the left) The IACHR in Bolivia in April 2023

In 2017 she was elected to be the Special Rapporteur on economic, social, culture, and environmental Rights serving on the Inter-American Commission on Human Rights. She is not there to represent Argentina but she is elected by the member states to serve on their behalf. She leads the autonomous Office of the Special Rapporteur on Economic, Social, Cultural and Environmental Rights (REDESCA) as part of the IACHR. In 2022 the IACHR recognised that climate change was a threat to human rights in South America. IACHR and REDESCA published resolution No. 3/21 "Climate Emergency: Scope of Inter-American human rights obligations" in Washington. Soledad Garcia Munoz and IACHR president Julissa Mantilla Falcón were pleased with this human rights approach to climate change.
