= Ana Lucía Riojas Martínez =

Mexican politician

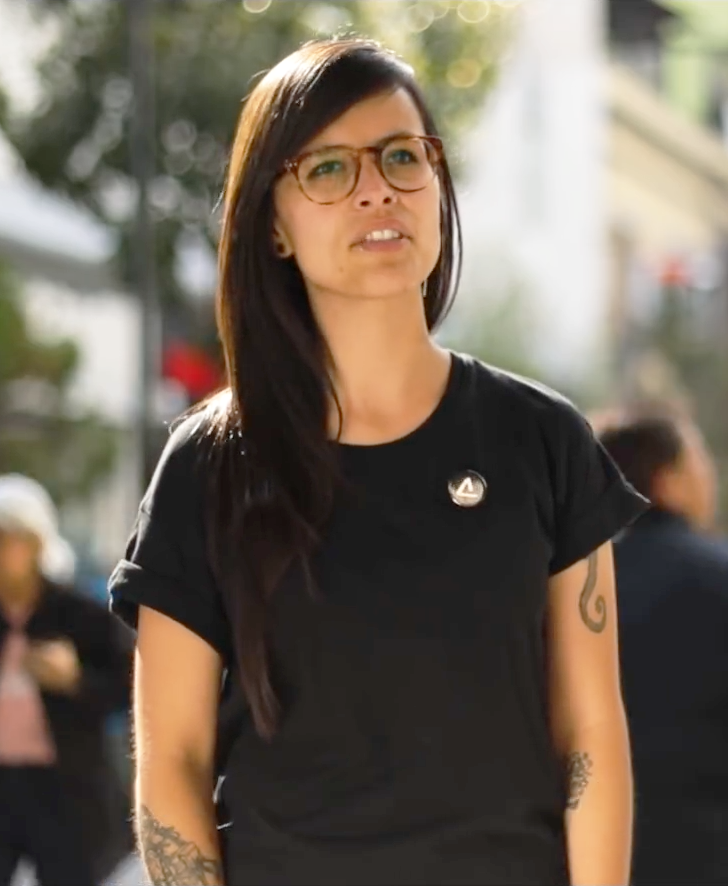

Federal Deputy of the Congress of the Union (proportional representation)
- Incumbent
- Assumed office 1 September 2018

Personal details
- Education: Universidad Iberoamericana
- Occupation: Drummer, social activist, politician

Ana Lucía Riojas Martínez is a Mexican politician who will serve as a Chamber of Deputies in the LXIV Legislature of the Mexican Congress.

== Life ==
Riojas studied communications at the Universidad Iberoamericana. While there, she was involved in the Yo Soy 132 movement.

In October 2017, Riojas registered as an independent candidate for head of government of Mexico City, with her candidacy being backed by a movement known as Ahora (Now), founded by Emilio Álvarez Icaza, which sought to back some 50 local candidates nationwide. However, she failed to get the 74,546 signatures necessary to get on the ballot in the race.

In April, the National Action Party placed Riojas on a guaranteed party list position for the fourth electoral region, ensuring her a seat in the Chamber of Deputies.

On August 10, 2018, unknown criminals broke into Riojas's girlfriend's car, leaving behind a sheet of "Daily Meditations" which included multiple Bible verses referring to "temptations of the flesh"; Riojas attributed the motive to homophobia and to the social activism she conducts. In a statement, she called on her fellow women and those in the LGBT community to "go out into the streets, proud of who you are."
