= Luis Reque =

Bolivian diplomat

Luis Reque (died June 23, 1992) was a Bolivian diplomat and the first Executive Secretary of the Inter-American Commission on Human Rights (IACHR).

== Biography ==
Reque was born in Cochabamba, Bolivia. While attending graduate school at American University, he joined the staff of the Organization of American States. While on staff, he drafted the statute for the IACHR, which was created in 1959. Reque became the commission's first executive secretary in 1960.

In the early 1970s, Reque and the IACHR worked to expose human rights violation in Brazil and Chile. Reque visited Chile in October 1973, shortly after Augusto Pinochet's overthrow of elected president Salvador Allende. During the visit, Reque observed the bullet-ridden bodies of seven men floating in Santiago's Mapocho River, whose deaths were a warning to opponents of Pinochet's government. Reque's report on extrajudicial executions embarrassed the Chilean government and led to a visit by the full Commission in July and August 1974. The Commission estimated that the government held 5,500 political prisoners and received the complaints of what they described as "a continuous procession of persons of all ages and social conditions filed in virtually twelve hours a day." Its 175-page report documented "very serious violations" of the rights to life, personal security, personal liberty, and seven other rights.

Pressure from the Brazilian and Chilean governments kept IACHR reports on these countries in the early 1970s from being publicly disclosed at the time, prompting Reque to share IACHR reports with the United Nations Commission on Human Rights and the press. In response, Chilean diplomats demanded his firing from the role of executive secretary. Ultimately, Reque and three of the IACHR's seven commissioners (Justino Jiménez de Arechaga, Robert F. Woodward, and Genaro R. Carrió) left the commission. In the aftermath of the controversy, the US Congress provided independent funding to the commission but Reque was never rehired.

Reque went on to serve office manager of the Kenwood Golf & Country Club in Bethesda. He became a United States citizen in 1982. He died of cancer in Gaithersburg, Maryland, in 1992.
