= Julissa Mantilla Falcón =

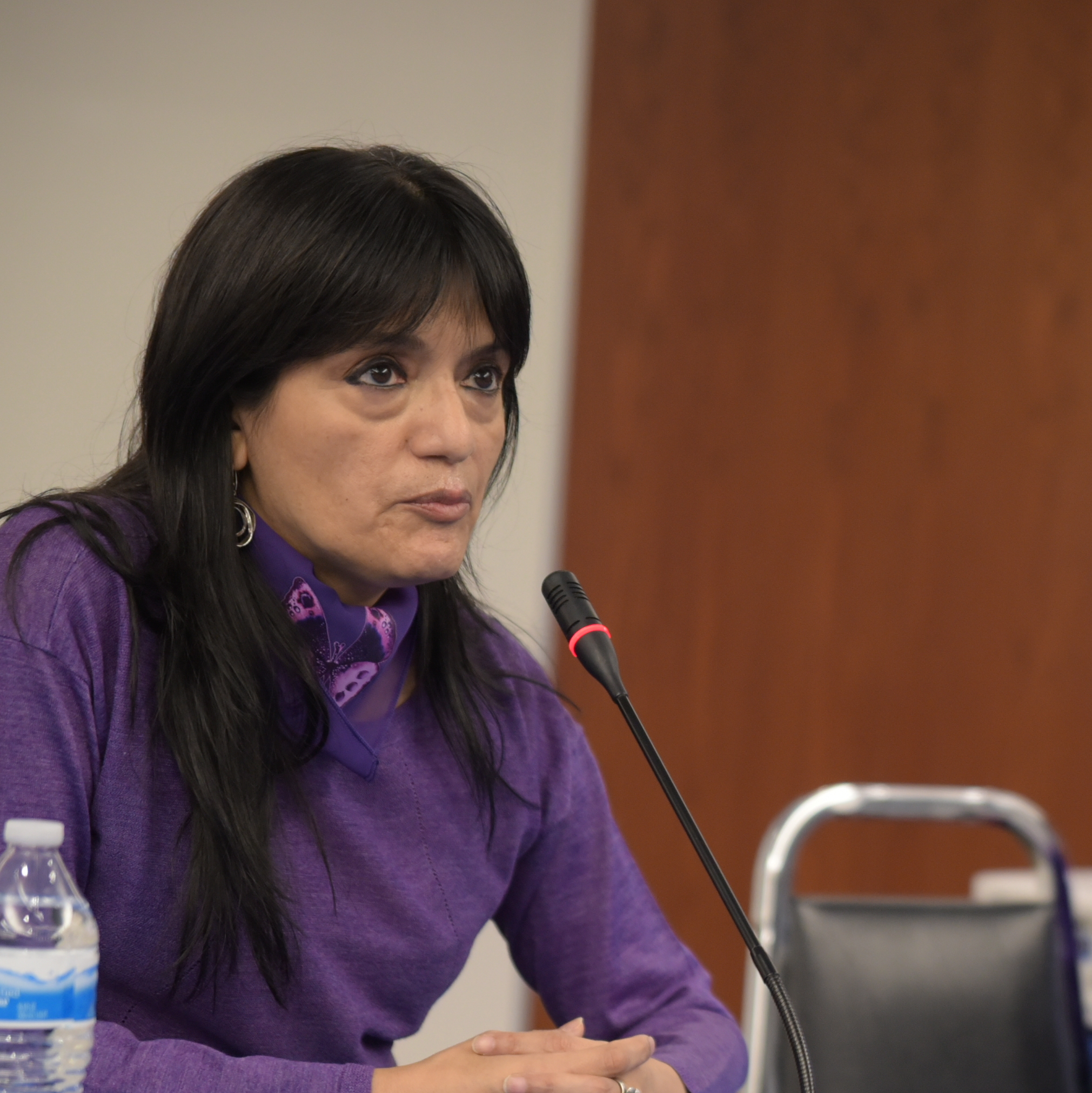
- Education: Pontifical Catholic University of Peru and the London School of Economics
- Occupation: lawyer
- Known for: Commissioner of the Inter-American Commission on Human Rights (IACHR).

Julissa Mantilla Falcón is a Peruvian Rapporteur on the Rights of Older Persons for OAS. She was elected by the Organization of American States (OAS) to serve from 2020 to 2023 as a Commissioner of the Inter-American Commission on Human Rights (IACHR). In 2021 she was the first vice-president of the IACHR as part of the first all woman team of President and vice-presidents.

== Life ==
Her first degree was at Pontifical Catholic University of Peru and she also took a master's degree at the London School of Economics. She returned to Peru where she worked in the Peruvian Ombudperson's office for human rights where she looked at forced sterilisation. Falcon completed a study looking at sexual violence against women during armed conflict. She later worked for the Peruvian Commission for Truth and Reconciliation where she took the lead on gender related issues. Falcon is a professor of Law and Gender at her alma mater.

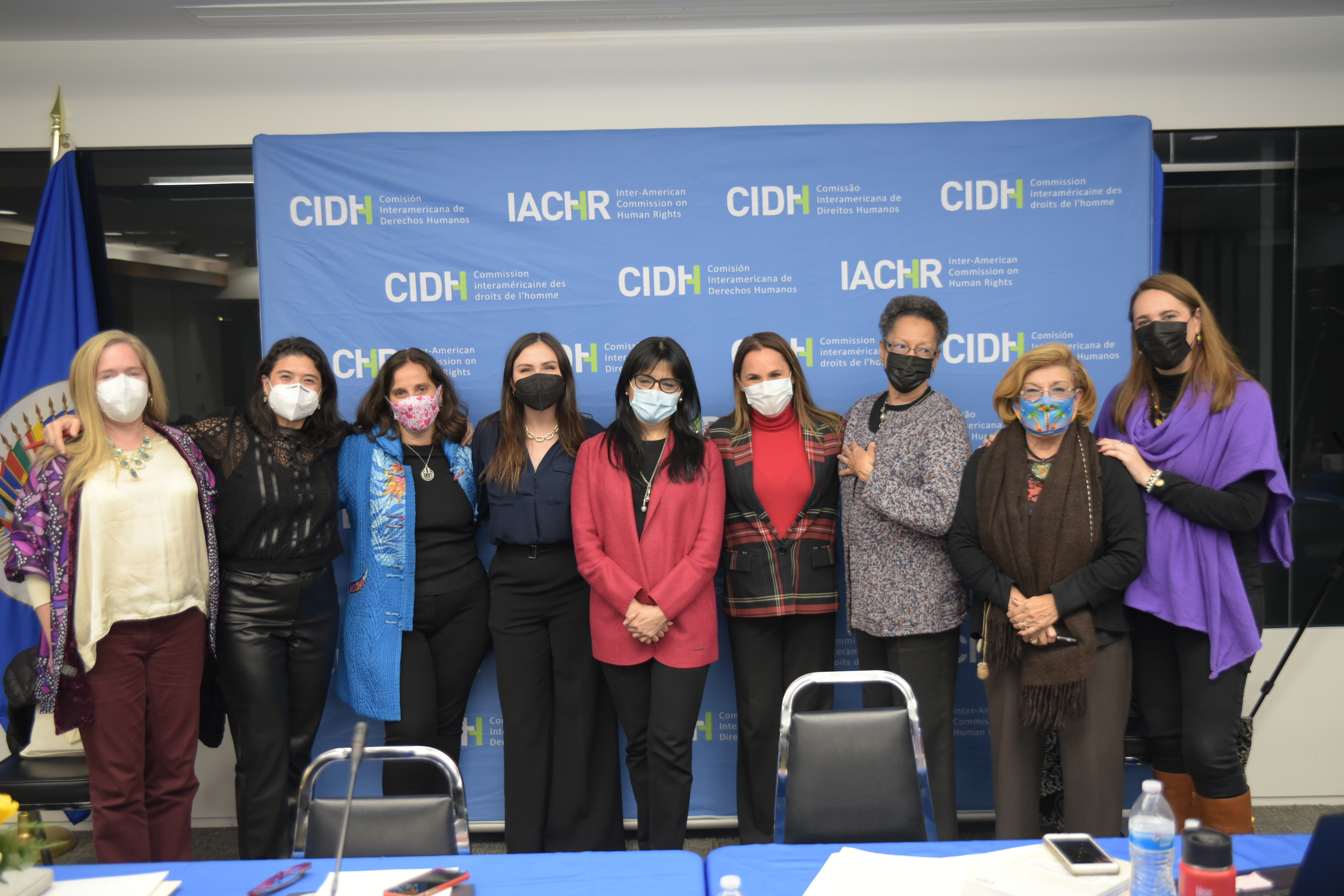
In DC in 2021. From left to right: Marisol Blanchard, 2. ?, Tania Reneaum Panszi, Antonia Urrejola Noguera,4. ?, Vice President Falcón, Flávia Piovesan, Margarette May Macaulay, Esmeralda Arosemena de Troitiño ,9. ?

On 28 June 2019, she was one of three candidates elected by the General Assembly of the OAS to serve for a four-year term from 1 January 2020 through to New Year's Eve in 2023.

In March 2021, Antonia Urrejola Noguera succeeded Joel Hernández as President of the Inter-American Commission on Human Rights leading the first all woman team of President and vice-presidents. Falcón became the first vice-president and Flávia Piovesan was the second. Falcon is the Rapporteur on the Rights of Migrants and on the Rights of Older Persons and the Rapporteur for Argentina, Barbados, Belize, Costa Rica, Granada, Saint Vincent and the Granadines and Uruguay.

In 2022, the IACHR recognised that climate change was a threat to human rights in South America. IACHR and the Office of the Special Rapporteur on Economic, Social, Cultural and Environmental Rights (REDESCA) published resolution No. 3/21 "Climate Emergency: Scope of Inter-American human rights obligations" in Washington. REDESCA's lead Soledad Garcia Munoz and IACHR president Julissa Mantilla Falcón were pleased with this human rights approach to climate change.
