= Esmeralda Arosemena de Troitiño =

Panamanian Supreme Court judge

Esmeralda Arosemena Troitiño
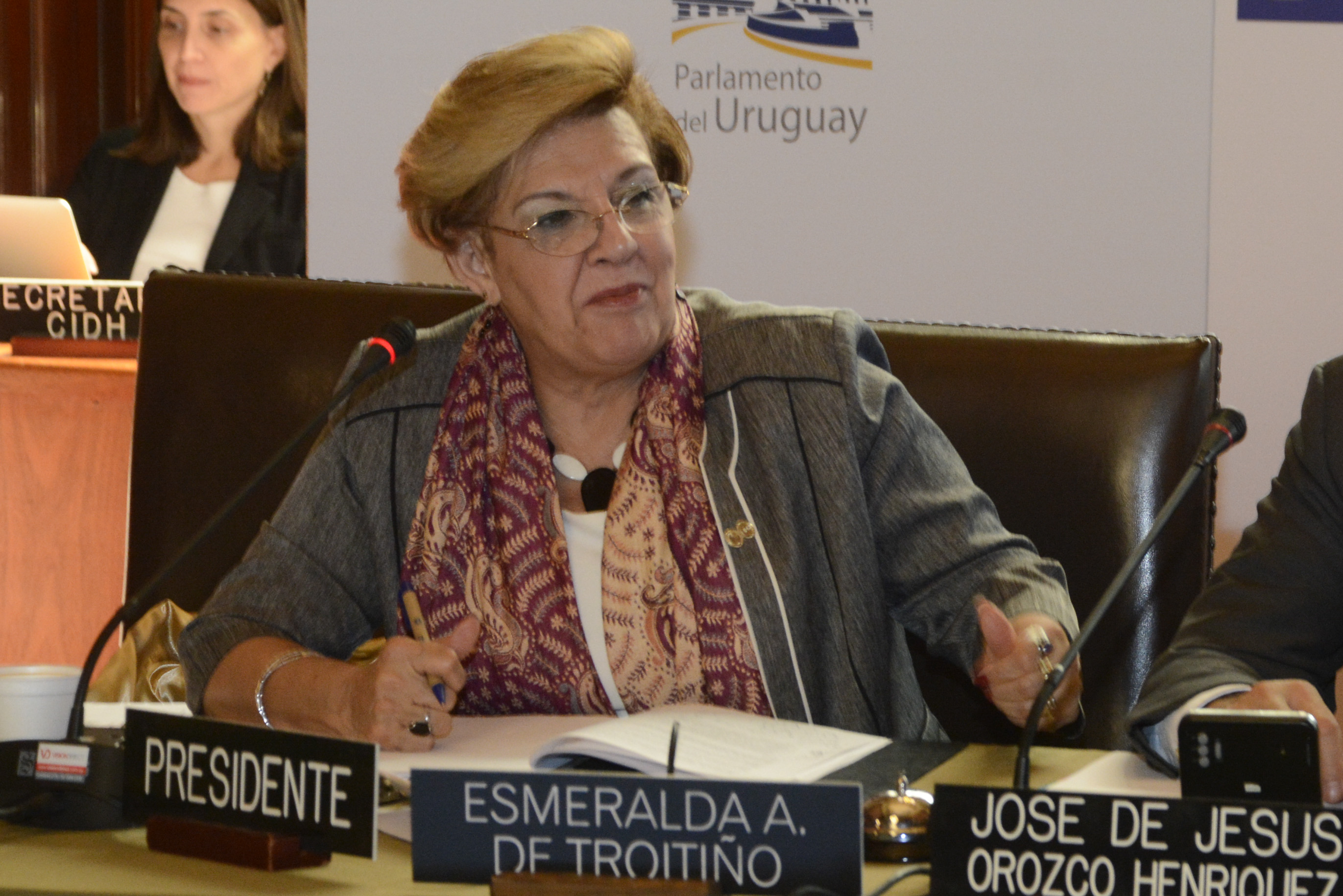
- Occupation: Judge

Esmeralda Arosemena de Troitiño is a lawyer and Supreme Count judge. She is a Panamanian Commissioner of the Inter-American Commission on Human Rights (OAS). In 2019, she became President of that body.

== Life ==
Troitiño is from Panama. She has two degrees. The first is in Philosophy, Letters and Education, with a specialization in Pedagogy and she also has a degree in Law and Political Science.

In 2011, she was working for the Commission preparing the 2016 Constitutional Procedural Code for Panama. She has been Vice President of Panama's Supreme Court of Justice as well as being a judge. She was President of the Panama's Criminal Chamber II and a judge for the Superior Court of Children and Adolescents.

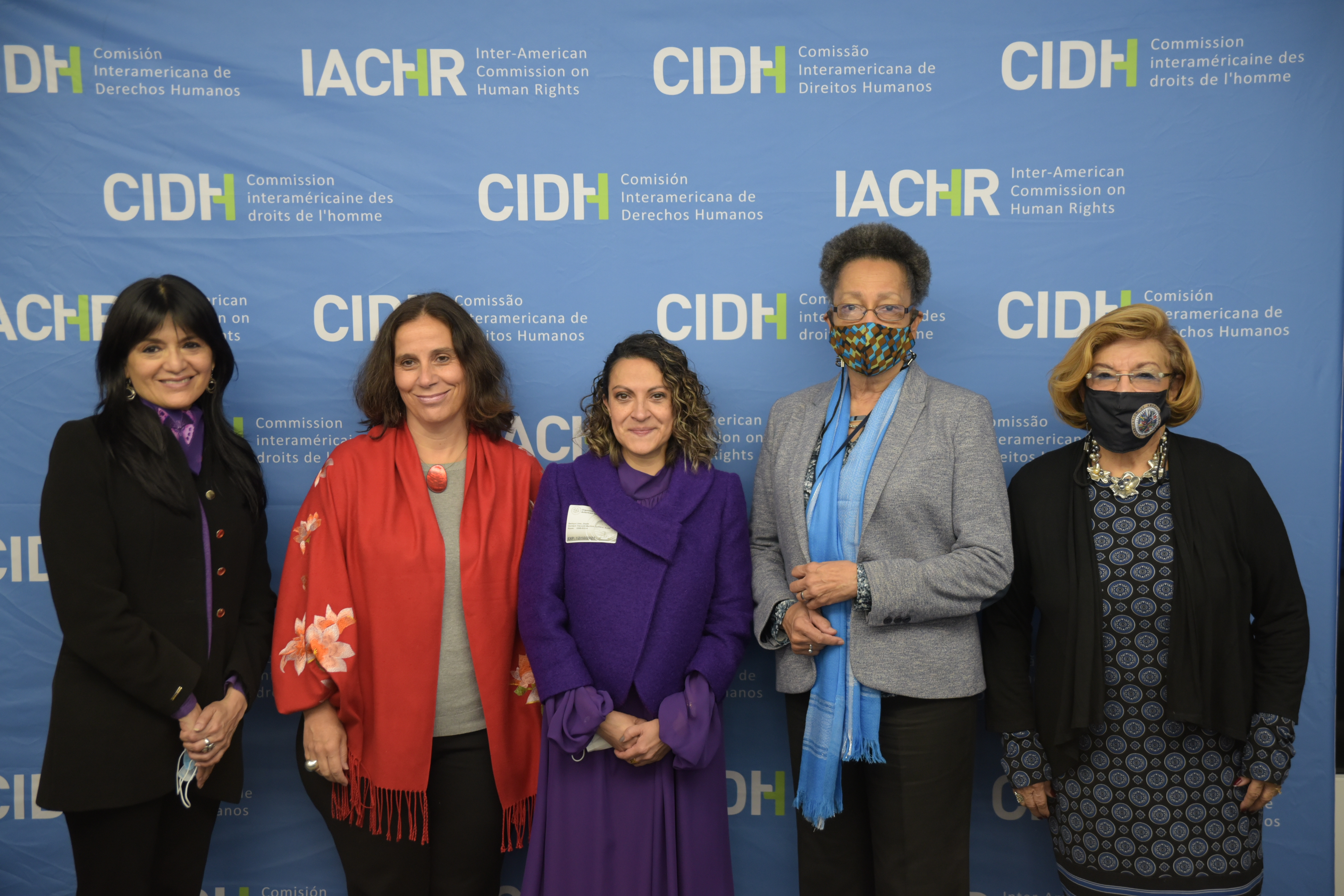
5 leaders on human-rights. l to R: Julissa Mantilla Falcón, Antonia Urrejola Noguera, Jineth Bedoya Lima, Margarette May Macaulay and de Troitiño at the Inter-American Commission on Human Rights in Washington DC in 2021

She was elected to the Inter-American Commission on Human Rights on June 16, 2015, by the OAS General Assembly, for a four-year term that ran from January 1, 2016, through December 31, 2019.

In February 2019, Troitiño was elected by the seven commissioners to be President of the Inter-American Commission on Human Rights (IACHR), whilst at a meeting in Sucre, Bolivia. During the COVID-19 pandemic in December 2020 and January 2021, she assisted in a virtual visit by Julissa Mantilla of the IACHR to Mexico. The team investigated the conditions of migrants in the country including the 66,000 created by Donald Trump's "Stay in Mexico" program.

In 2022, she presented the IACHR's report on human rights in Nicaragua. The report noted that since 2018 there had been "serious human rights violations".
