= Tania Reneaum =

Executive Secretary of the Inter-American Commission on Human Rights (2021 –

Tania Reneaum Panszi
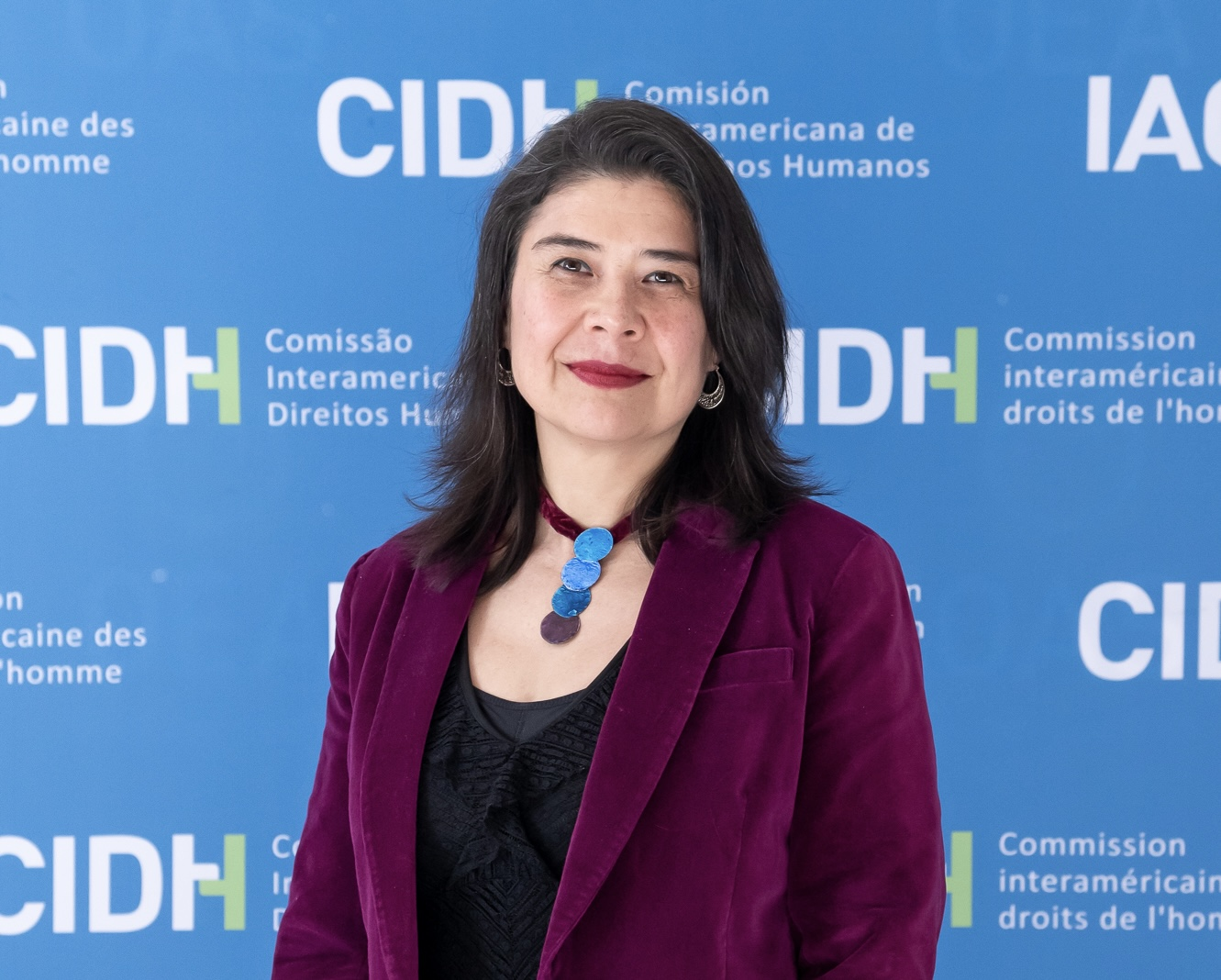
- Education: Pompeu Fabra University
- Occupations: Lawyer; human rights worker
- Known for: Executive Secretary of the Inter-American Commission on Human Rights
- Predecessor: Paulo Abrão

Tania Reneaum Panszi is a Mexican lawyer and currently serves as the Executive Secretary of the Inter-American Commission on Human Rights (IACHR). She was appointed to the position on June 1, 2021, becoming the first elected woman, and second woman in the history of the IACHR to hold this role, after Edith Márquez Rodríguez from Venezuela, who served from 1990 to 1996.

== Life ==
Reneaum Panszi holds a PhD in Law from Pompeu Fabra University in Barcelona in 2014 which is where she also gained a master's degree. Her PhD thesis was titled "Should Women Be Forced to Testify? A Criminological Contribution to the Debate on Whether Victims of Intimate Partner Violence Should Be Obliged to Testify in Criminal Proceedings.".

She also holds a second masters qualification in Criminal Law and Comparative Social Problems from the University of Barcelona in addition to a first degree in Legal Sciences from the Central American University, San Salvador in El Salvador.

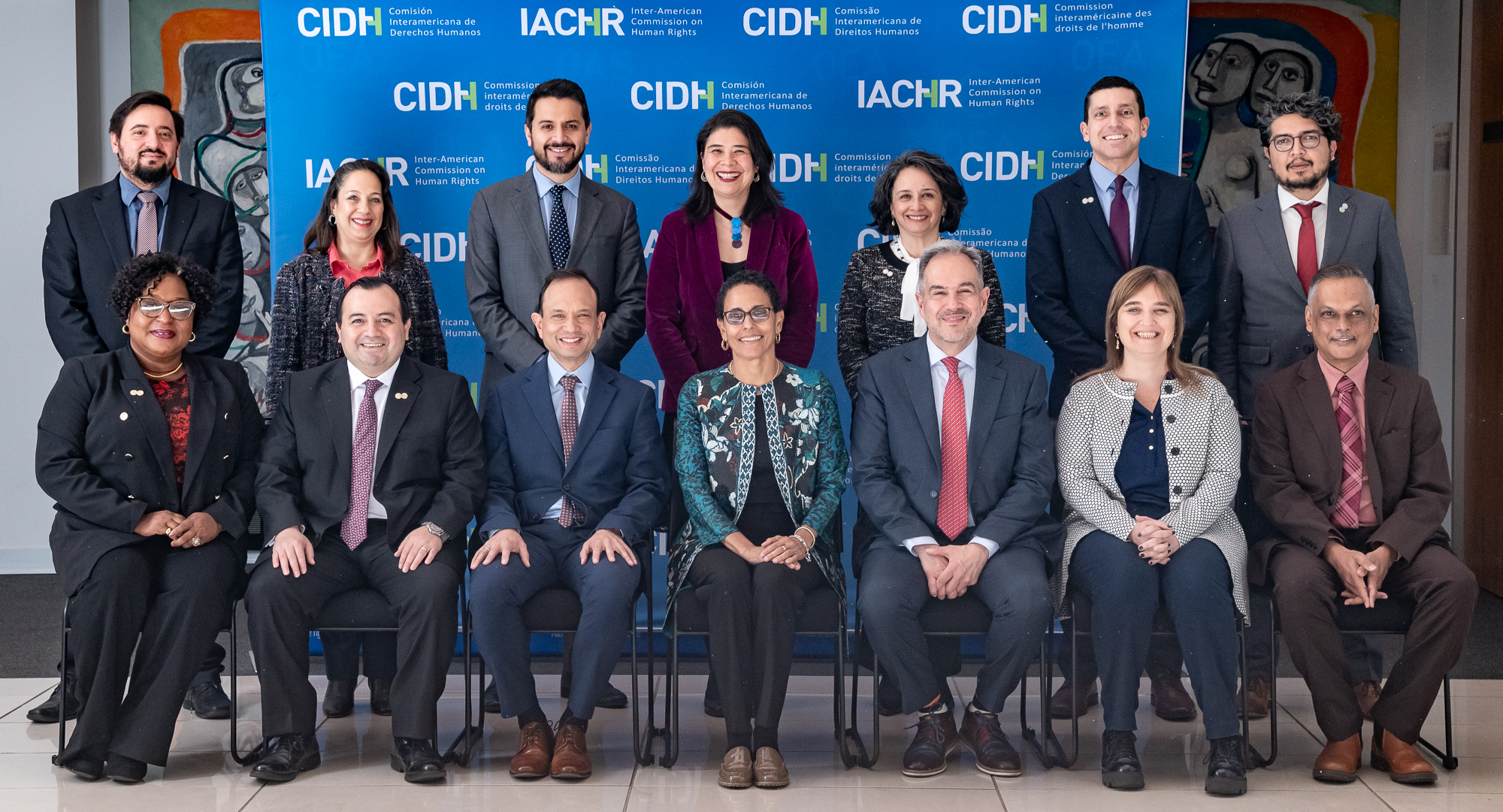
The IACHR/CIDH team in 2024. In the front row are the elected commissioners with the President at their centre. Behind are the appointed officials with Reneaum at the centre of the row.

== IACHR Executive Secretary ==
On May 4, 2021, the IACHR announced the selection of Tania Reneaum Panszi as Executive Secretary, a position she assumed on June 1, 2021, for a four-year term, following the end of her predecessor mandate, Paulo Abrao. Her appointment was the result of a public selection process initiated by the Commission in September 2020, which included the evaluation of 450 applications, interviews, and the selection of five finalists. Her CV was published for public scrutiny. According to the procedure, the candidate selected by the Commission is formally appointed by the Secretary General of the OAS, Luis Almagro and considered a person of "independence and high moral standing" with a good understanding of human rights. In November 2024, the IACHR renewed her mandate for a second four-year term, through May 31, 2029.
