= Flávia Piovesan =

Brazilian lawyer and human rights Commissioner

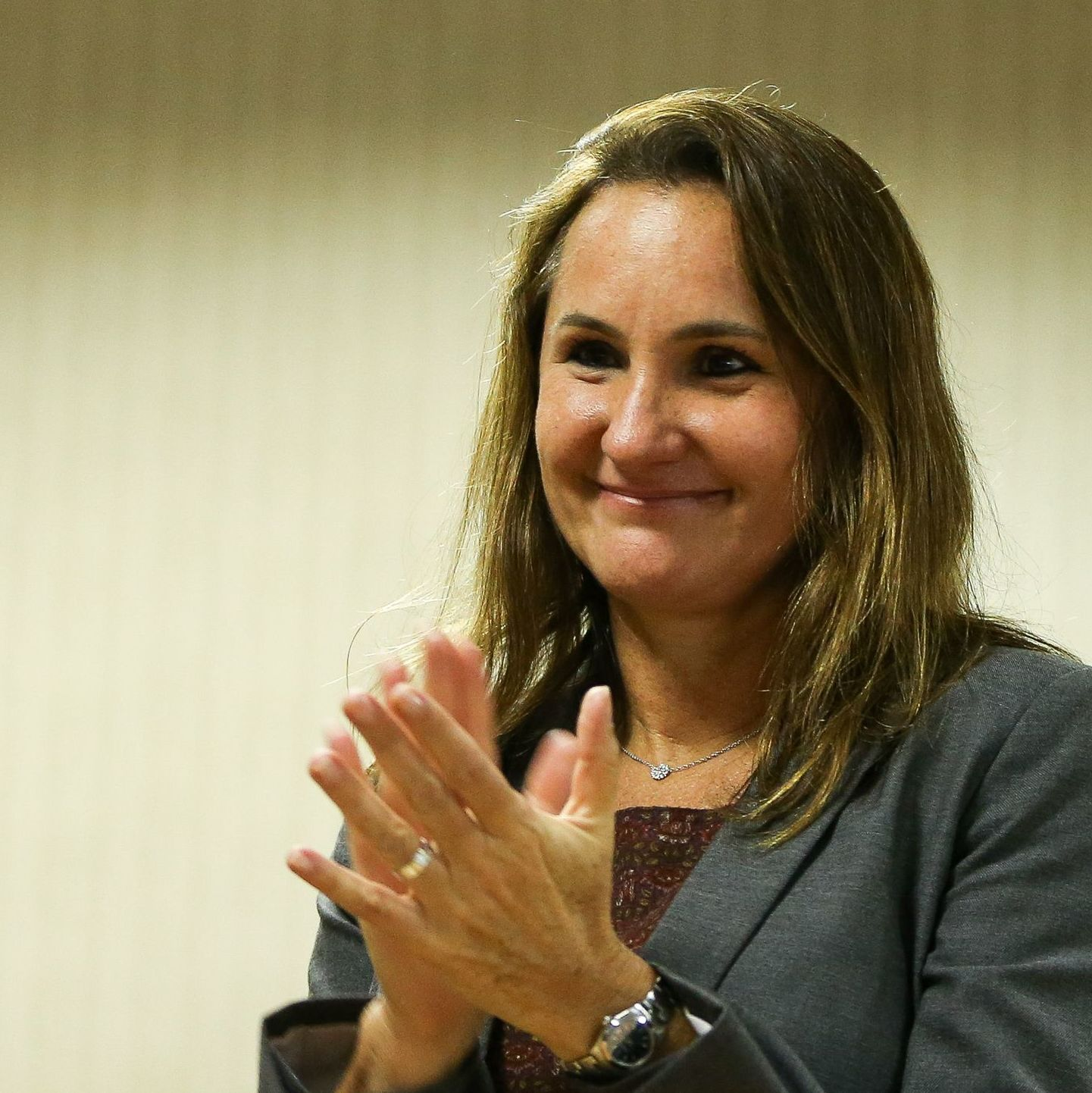
- in 2017
- Born: c. 1968
- Occupation: Lawyer
- Known for: Commissioner of the Inter-American Commission on Human Rights (IACHR)

Flávia Piovesan (born c.1968) is a Brazilian lawyer and human rights Commissioner. She was elected by the Organization of American States (OAS) to serve from 2018 to 2021 as a Commissioner of the Inter-American Commission on Human Rights (IACHR). In 2021 she was the 2nd vice-president of the IACHR as part of the first all woman team of President and vice-presidents.

== Life ==
Piovesan took a master's degree and a PhD at the Catholic University of São Paulo. She conducted long term human rights research at Harvard Law School, Oxford University and the Max Planck Institute after she gained her doctorate. She was the Humboldt Foundation Georg Forster Research Fellow from 2009 to 2014 at the Max Planck Institute.

In 1991 she became a professor of Constitutional Law and Humans Rights at the Catholic University of São Paulo. Piovesan has also worked with the University of Buenos Aires, the American University, the Catholic University of Paraná and Pablo de Olavide University.

In 2009 her name was discussed as a candidate to sit on Brazil's Supreme Court but she said that her expertise was in human rights and she needed to learn about other areas of the law. She is a strong opponent of suggestions that abortion should be illegal. She has noted that human rights have expanded - at one time poverty was seen as a crime where it is now seen as possibly an infringement of someone's human rights. She has noted that a very large proportion of Brazil's poor were of African descent and only a minority of the population have access to the law.

In 2016, Piovesan became Brazil's Special Secretary for Human Rights when she was appointed by Brazilian President Michel Temer.

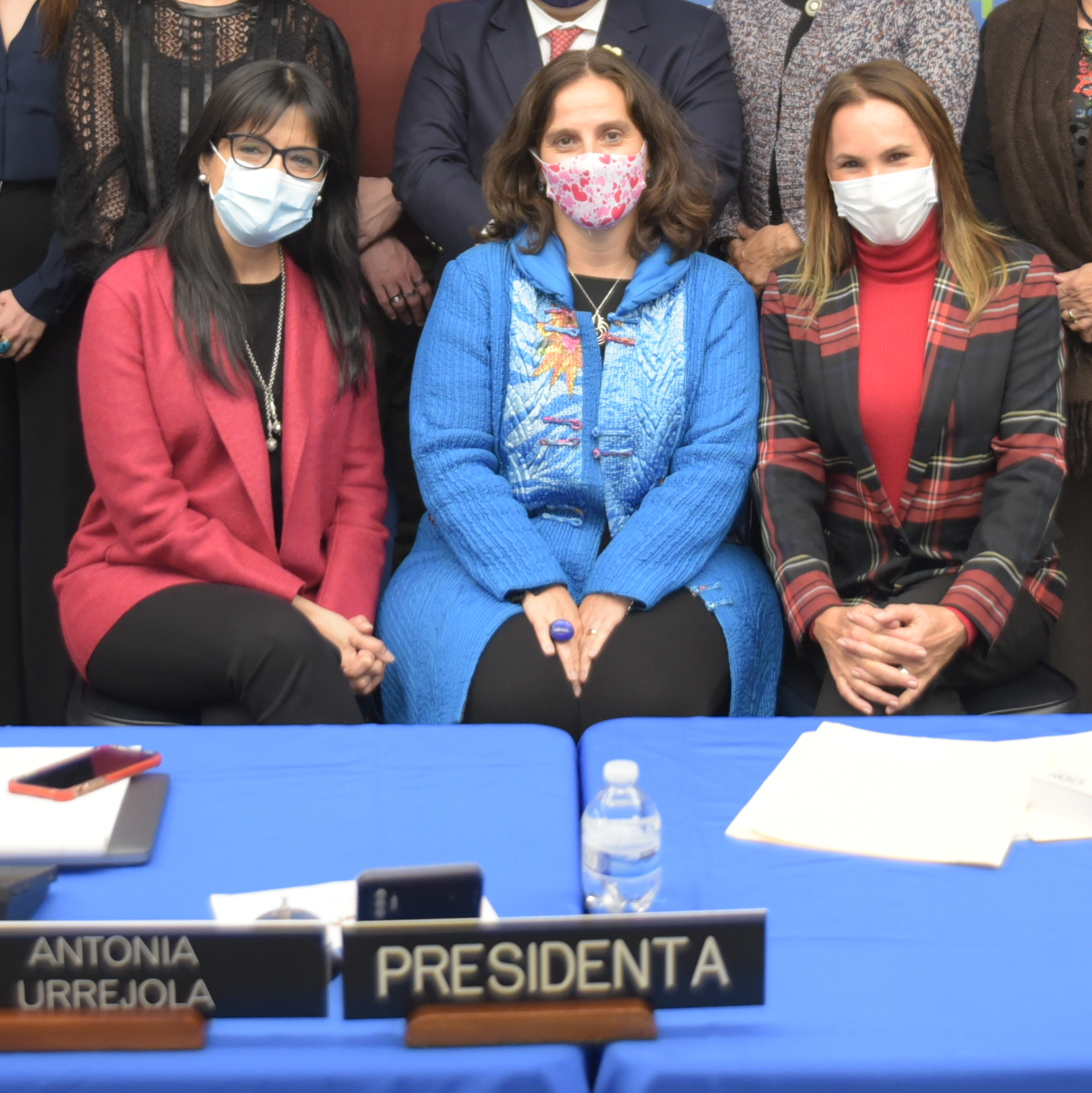
VP Julissa Mantilla Falcón, President Antonia Urrejola Noguera and VP Flávia Piovesan in 2021

In 2017 she was one of three candidates elected by the General Assembly of the OAS to serve for a four-year term from 1 January 2018 through to New Year's Eve in 2021. Six people had been nominated for the election and she was seen as one of the strongest candidates despite the poor human rights record in Brazil. Other candidates elected were Chilean human rights lawyer Antonia Urrejola Noguera and Mexican diplomat Joel Hernández García. She became the OAS's Rapporteur on the Rights of Lesbians, Gays, Bisexuals, Trans and Intersex Persons.

In 2020 the "Research Handbook on International Law and Social Rights" was published and Piovesan was one of the four editors together with Prof. Christina Binder, Dr. Jane A Hofbauer and Amaya Úbeda de Torres.

In March 2021 Antonia Urrejola Noguera succeeded Joel Hernández as President of the Inter-American Commission on Human Rights leading the first all woman team of President and vice-presidents. Julissa Mantilla Falcón became the first vice-president and Flávia Piovesan was the second.
