= Inter-American Commission on Human Rights =

Human rights monitoring organization in the Americas

- English logo
- Abbreviation: IACHR
- Formation: 1959
- Location: Washington, D.C., U.S.
- Region served: Americas (ACHR signatories, OAS members)
- Members: Antigua and Barbuda, Argentina, Barbados, Belize, Bolivia, Brazil, Canada, Chile, Colombia, Costa Rica, Dominica, Dominican Republic, Ecuador, El Salvador, Grenada, Guatemala, Guyana, Haiti, Honduras, Jamaica, Mexico, Nicaragua, Panama, Paraguay, Peru, Saint Kitts and Nevis, Saint Lucia, Saint Vincent and the Grenadines, Suriname, The Bahamas, Trinidad and Tobago, United States, Uruguay, Venezuela
- Executive Secretary: (Mexico) Tania Reneaum
- Parent organization: Organization of American States
- Website: www.oas.org/en/iachr/

The Inter-American Commission on Human Rights (IACHR; Spanish: Comisión Interamericana de los Derechos Humanos; French: Commission Interaméricaine des Droits de l'Homme; Portuguese: Comissão Interamericana de Direitos Humanos; CIDH) is an autonomous organ of the Organization of American States (OAS).

The separate Inter-American Court of Human Rights is an autonomous judicial institution based in the city of San José, Costa Rica. Together the court and the commission make up the human rights protection system of the OAS.

== Composition ==
IACHR is a permanent body based in Washington, D.C., United States. It holds regular and special sessions throughout the year to review human rights complaints in the Americas.

The commission’s mandate is based on three key documents: the Charter of the Organization of American States (OAS), the American Declaration of the Rights and Duties of Man, and the American Convention on Human Rights.

== History of the Inter-American human rights system ==
The Inter-American system for protecting human rights began on 2 May 1948 with the adoption of the American Declaration of the Rights and Duties of Man by the Organization of American States (OAS). This was the first general international human rights instrument, preceding the Universal Declaration of Human Rights by more than six months.

The Inter-American Commission on Human Rights (IACHR) was established in 1959. It held its first session in 1960 and conducted its first on-site visit in 1961 to examine the human rights situation in the Dominican Republic.

In 1965, the commission was formally authorized to investigate individual complaints of human rights violations. Since then, it has received thousands of petitions and processed over 12,000 cases.

The American Convention on Human Rights, adopted in 1969, expanded on the principles of the 1948 Declaration. It set out the obligations of states to uphold specific rights and established the Inter-American Court of Human Rights. As of now, the Convention is binding on 24 of the OAS’s 35 member states.

The commission's performance has not been always welcomed. Among others, Venezuela has accused the commission of politicization. Others criticize the commission's stress on certain issues over others. These criticisms have given rise to what was called the "Strengthening Process of the Commission". This process began in 2011, led by the States belonging to the Bolivarian Alliance for the Americas.

== Functions ==
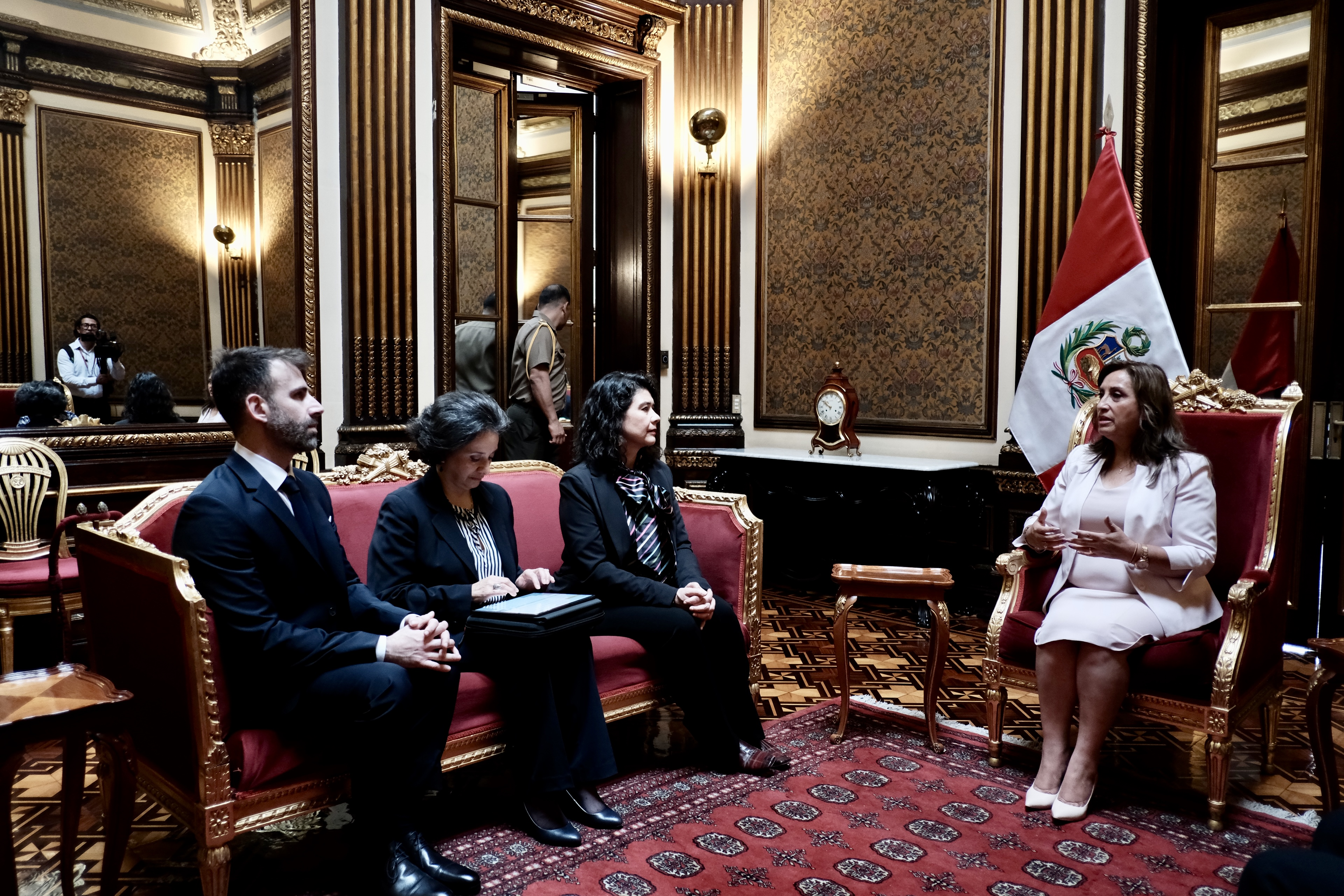
IACHR representatives meeting with President Dina Boluarte during the 2022 Peruvian political protests

The main task of the IACHR is to promote the observance and defense of human rights in the Americas.

In pursuit of this mandate it:

- Receives, analyzes, and investigates individual petitions alleging violations of specific human rights protected by the American Convention on Human Rights.
- Works to resolve petitions in a collaborative way that is amiable to both parties.
- Monitors the general human rights situation in the OAS's member states and, when necessary, prepares and publishes country-specific human rights reports.
- Conducts on-site visits to examine members' general human rights situation or to investigate specific cases.
- Encourages public awareness about human rights and related issues throughout the hemisphere.
- Holds conferences, seminars, and meetings with governments, NGOs, academic institutions, etc. to inform and raise awareness about issues relating to the inter-American human rights system.
- Issues member states with recommendations that, if adopted, would further the cause of human rights protection.
- Requests that states adopt precautionary measures to prevent serious and irreparable harm to human rights in urgent cases.
- Refers cases to the Inter-American Court of Human Rights, and litigates those same cases before the Court.
- Asks the Inter-American Court to provide advisory opinions on matters relating to the interpretation of the convention or other related instruments.

== Rapporteurships and units ==
The IACHR has created several thematic rapporteurships and two special rapporteurships to monitor OAS states' compliance with inter-American human rights treaties in the following areas:

- Rapporteurship on the Rights of Indigenous Peoples (1990)
- Rapporteurship on the Rights of Women (the first rapporteurship created by the IACHR in 1994)
- Rapporteurship on Migrant Workers and their Families (1996)
- Rapporteurship on the Rights of the Child (1998)
- Rapporteurship on Human Rights Defenders (2001)
- Rapporteurship on the Rights of Persons Deprived of Liberty (2004)
- Rapporteurship on the Rights of Afro-Descendants and against Racial Discrimination (2005)
- Rapporteurship on the Rights of Lesbian, Gay, Trans, Bisexual, and Intersex Persons (2014)
- Rapporteurship on Memory, Truth, and Justice (2019)
- Rapporteurship on the Rights of Older Persons (2019)
- Rapporteurship on the Rights of Persons with Disabilities, 2019

The Special Rapporteur for Freedom of Expression and the Special Rapporteur for Economic, Social, Cultural, and Environmental Rights are full-time dedicated positions. The former was created in 1997, while the latter was established in 2017, with Soledad García Muñoz of Argentina as the first holder of the office. The other rapporteurships are in the hands of the commissioners, who have other functions at the IACHR and also their own jobs in their home countries, since their work as commissioners is unpaid.

Rapporteurships are initially established by the commission as thematic units prior to being upgraded to rapporteurships.

The IACHR also has a Press and Outreach Office.

== Petitions ==
Under its Rules of Procedure, the IACHR reviews petitions submitted by individuals or non-governmental organizations. These petitions are treated as confidential and are not made public. To be admissible, a petition must meet three conditions: domestic legal remedies must have been exhausted, the petition must be submitted within six months of the final decision in the domestic system, and it must not be under consideration by another international body.

Once a petition has been filed, it follows the following procedure:

- Petition is forwarded to the Secretariat and reviewed for completeness; if complete, it is registered and is given a case number. This is where the state is notified of the petition.
- Petition reviewed for admissibility.
- The Commission tries to find a friendly settlement.
- If no settlement is found, then briefs are filed by each side on the merits of the case.
- The Commission then files a report on the merits, known as an Article 50 report from relevant article of the convention. This is a basically a ruling by the commission with recommendations on how to solve the conflict. The Article 50 report is sent to the state. This is a confidential report; the petitioner does not get a full copy of this report.
- The state is given two months to comply with the recommendations of the report.
- The petitioner then has one month to file a petition asking for the issue to be sent to the Inter-American Court (only applicable if the State in question has recognized the competence of the Inter-American Court).
- The commission has three months, from the date the Article 50 report is given to the state, to either publish the Article 50 report or send the case to the Inter-American Court of Human Rights. Alternatively, the commission can also choose to monitor the situation. The American Convention establishes that if the report is not submitted to the Court within three months it may not be submitted in the future, but if the State asks for more time in order to comply with the recommendations of the Article 50 report, the Commission might grant it on the condition that the State signs a waiver on this requirement.

== Composition ==
The IACHR's ranking officers are its seven commissioners. The commissioners are elected by the OAS General Assembly, for four-year terms, with the possibility of re-election on one occasion, for a maximum period in office of eight years. They serve in a personal capacity and are not considered to represent their countries of origin but rather "all the member countries of the Organization" (Convention, Art. 35). The convention (Art. 34) says that they must "be persons of high moral character and recognized competence in the field of human rights". No two nationals of the same member state may be commissioners simultaneously (Art. 37), and commissioners are required to refrain from participating in the discussion of cases involving their home countries (Rules of Procedure, Art. 17).

In 2025 Marion Bethel from the Bahamas was elected to serve on the IACHR from 2026 to 2029, along with the American Rosa María Payá and José Luis Caballero Ochoa from Mexico (re-elected).

=== Current commissioners (2026) ===
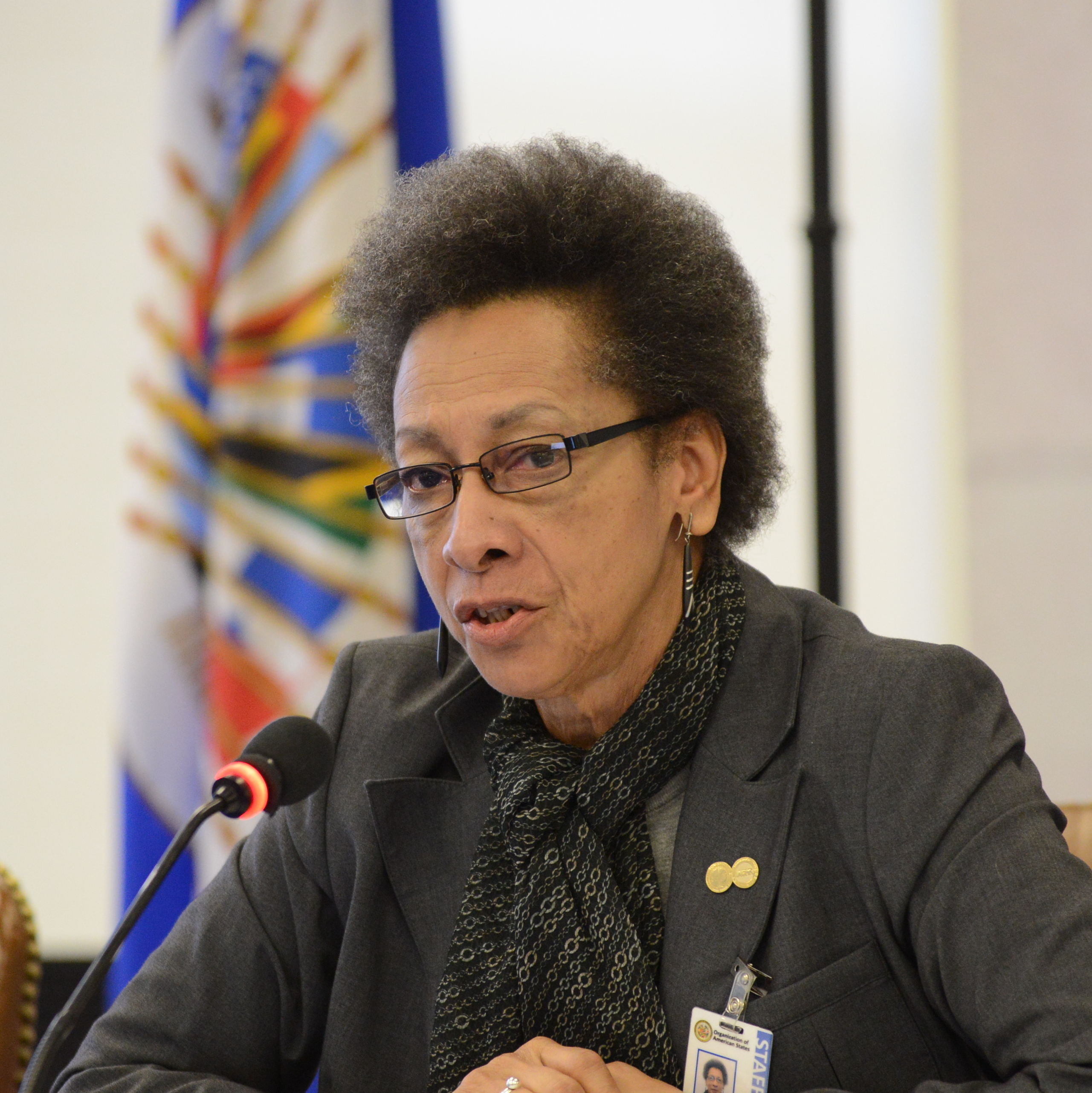
Margarette May Macaulay, former IACHR President

Name	State	Position	Elected	Term
Edgar Stuardo Ralón Orellana	Guatemala	President	2019	2020–2027
Andrea Pochak	Argentina	First Vice President	2023	2024–2027
José Luis Caballero Ochoa	Mexico	First Vice President	2022	2023–2029
Gloria Monique de Mees	Suriname	Commissioner	2023	2024–2027
Riyad Insanally	Guyana	Commissioner	2023	2025–2027
Marion Bethel	Bahamas	Commissioner	2025	2026–2029
Rosa María Payá	United States	Commissioner	2025	2026–2029
Source: IACHR

=== Past commissioners ===
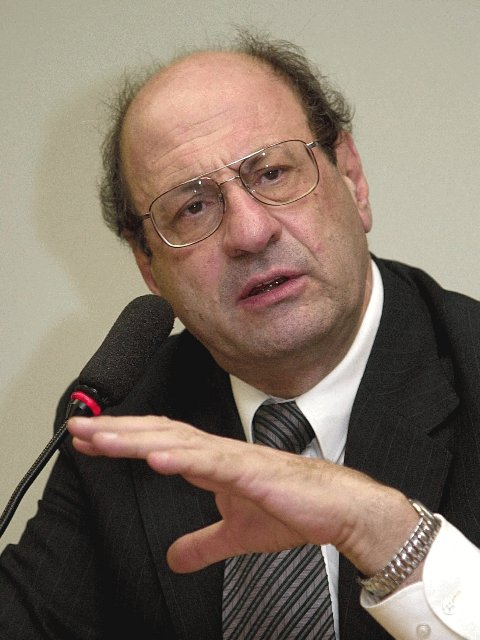
José Zalaquett, President 2004

Year	State	Commissioners	President (post-2001) Chairman (pre-2001)
1960–1963	Venezuela	Rómulo Gallegos	1960
1960–1964	El Salvador	Reynaldo Galindo Pohl	
1960–1968	Ecuador	Gonzalo Escudero	
1960–1972	Costa Rica	Ángela Acuña de Chacón	
1960–1972	USA	Durward V. Sandifer	
1960–1972	Chile	Manuel Bianchi Gundián	
1960–1979	Mexico	Gabino Fraga	
1964–1968	Uruguay	Daniel Hugo Martins	
1964–1983	Brazil	Carlos A. Dunshee de Abranches	
1968–1972	Peru	Mario Alzamora Valdez	
1968–1972	Uruguay	Justino Jiménez de Arechega	
1972–1976	Argentina	Genaro R. Carrió	
1972–1976	USA	Robert F. Woodward	
1972–1985	Venezuela	Andrés Aguilar	
1976–1979	Guatemala	Carlos García Bauer	
1976–1979	Costa Rica	Fernando Volio Jiménez	
1976–1983	USA	Tom J. Farer	
1976–1978	Colombia	José Joaquín Gori	
1978–1987	Colombia	Marco Gerardo Monroy Cabra	
1980–1987	El Salvador	Francisco Bertrand Galindo	
1980–1985	Mexico	César Sepúlveda	
1980–1985	Costa Rica	Luis Demetrio Tinoco Castro	
1984–1988	USA	R. Bruce McColm	
1984–1987	Bolivia	Luis Adolfo Siles Salinas	
1984–1991	Brazil	Gilda Maciel Correa Russomano	
1986–1989	Argentina	Elsa Kelly	
1986–1993	Venezuela	Marco Tulio Bruni-Celli	
1986–1993	Barbados	Oliver H. Jackman	
1988–1991	USA	John Reese Stevenson	
1988–1995	Honduras	Leo Valladares Lanza	
1988–1995	Jamaica	Patrick Lipton Robinson	
1990–1997	Argentina	Óscar Luján Fappiano	
1992–1995	USA	Michael Reisman	
1994–1997	Trinidad and Tobago	John S. Donaldson	1997
1998–1999	Barbados	Sir Henry de Boulay Forde	
1992–1999	Colombia	Álvaro Tirado Mejía	1995
1996–1999	Venezuela	Carlos Ayala Corao	1998
1996–1999	Haiti	Jean-Joseph Exumé	
1994–2001	Chile	Claudio Grossman	1996, 2001
1998–2001	Brazil	Hélio Bicudo	2000
1999–2001	Barbados	Peter Laurie	
2002–2002	Peru	Diego García Sayán	
1996–2003	USA	Robert K. Goldman	1999
2000–2003	Guatemala	Marta Altolaguirre	2003
2000–2003	Argentina	Juan E. Méndez	2002
2000–2003	Ecuador	Julio Prado Vallejo	
2002–2005	Peru	Susana Villarán	
2001–2005	Chile	José Zalaquett	2004
2004–2007	Paraguay	Evelio Fernández Arévalos	2006
2004–2007	Venezuela	Freddy Gutiérrez	
2002–2009	Antigua and Barbuda	Sir Clare Kamau Roberts	
2004–2009	El Salvador	Florentín Meléndez	
2006–2009	Argentina	Víctor Abramovich	
2006–2009	USA	Paolo Carozza	2008
2004–2011	Brazil	Paulo Sérgio Pinheiro	
2008–2011	Venezuela	Luz Patricia Mejía	2009
2009–2011	El Salvador	María Silvia Guillén	
2010–2013	Colombia	Rodrigo Escobar Gil	
2010–2013	USA	Dinah Shelton	
2008–2015	Chile	Felipe González Morales	2010
2012–2015	Saint Lucia; Trinidad and Tobago	Rose-Marie Belle Antoine	2015
2012–2015	Jamaica	Tracy Robinson	2014
2012–2015	Paraguay	Rosa María Ortiz	
2017–2019	Colombia	Luis Ernesto Vargas Silva	
2016–2019	Peru	Francisco José Eguiguren Praeli	
2018–2021	Chile	Antonia Urrejola Noguera	
2018–2021	Brazil	Flávia Piovesan	
2018–2023	Mexico	Joel Hernández García	
2022–2025	Barbados	Roberta Clarke	
2022–2025	Colombia	Carlos Bernal Pulido	
2024–2027	Guyana	Arif Bulkan	
Source: IACHR

=== Executive Secretaries ===
The staff of the IACHR comprise its Secretariat, which is led by an Executive Secretary, who serves for what have recently been four-year, renewable contracts.

In August 2020, OAS Secretary General Luis Almagro announced that he would not renew Paulo Abrão's contract as Executive Secretary of the IACHR, citing 61 personnel complaints by staff of the organization. The Commissioners of the IACHR had unanimously approved the contract extension in January 2020, and expressed their "profound rejection" of Almagro's action "whose refusal to renew this contract breaks with a 20-year practice of respecting the IACHR's decision to appoint its own Executive Secretary and thus makes it difficult to obtain truth, justice, and reparation for those whose labor rights have been affected." UN High Commissioner for Human Rights Michelle Bachelet, Human Rights Watch, and the Mexican government have also objected to Abrão's removal.

Tania Reneaum, a Mexican, was appointed as the new Executive Secretary in 2021.

Executive Secretary of the Inter-American Commission on Human Rights
Name	Country	Term	Notes
Luis Reque	Bolivia	1960 – June 1976	
Charles D. Moyer	United States	January – August 1977	Interim Executive Secretary
Edmundo Vargas Carreño	Chile	September 1977 – March 1990	
David J. Padilla	United States	March – June 1990	Interim Executive Secretary
Edith Márquez Rodríguez	Venezuela	May 1990 – February 1996	
David J. Padilla	United States	January – May 1996	Interim Executive Secretary
Jorge Enrique Taiana	Argentina	March 1996 – July 2001	
Santiago Cantón	Argentina	August 2001 – June 2012	
Emilio Álvarez Icaza	Mexico	August 2012 – August 2016	
Paulo Abrão	Brazil	August 2016 – August 2020	
María Claudia Pulido	Colombia	17 August 2020 – June 2021	Acting Executive Secretary
Tania Reneaum Panszi	Mexico	June 2021 – present	
Source: OAS, Former IACHR Executive Secretaries.

== Human rights allegations investigated by the Inter-American Commission ==
- 2014 Iguala mass kidnapping (Mexico)
- Antoine Izméry (Haiti)
- Barrios Altos massacre (Peru)
- Censorship in Venezuela (Venezuela)
- Deaths in Ciudad Juárez (Mexico)
- District of Columbia voting rights (United States)
- Domestic violence protection in the case of Jessica Gonzales (United States)
- El Caracazo (Venezuela)
- Extrajudicial detention in Guantánamo of Djamel Ameziane (United States)
- Internment of Japanese Latin Americans (United States)
- Japanese embassy hostage crisis (Peru)
- La Cantuta massacre (Peru)
- Lori Berenson (Peru)
- Massacre of Trujillo (Colombia)
- Plan de Sánchez massacre (Guatemala)
- United States strikes on alleged drug traffickers during Operation Southern Spear (United States)
