= Antonia Urrejola =

Chilean lawyer

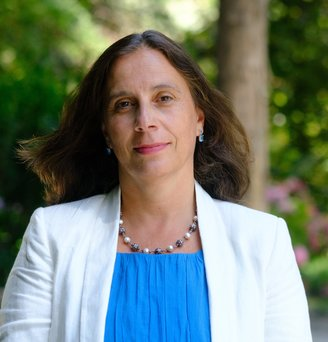

Minister of Foreign Affairs
- In office 11 March 2022 – 10 March 2023
- President: Gabriel Boric
- Preceded by: Carolina Valdivia
- Succeeded by: Alberto van Klaveren

Commissioner and President of the Inter-American Commission on Human Rights
- Incumbent
- Assumed office 2021
- Preceded by: Joel Hernández García

Personal details
- Born: 13 November 1968 (age 57) Santiago, Chile
- Occupation: Lawyer
- Executive Secretary: Maria Claudia Pulido

Antonia Urrejola Noguera (born 13 November 1968) is a Chilean lawyer who served as Minister of Foreign Affairs from 11 March 2022 to 10 March 2023. She was previously elected by the Organization of American States (OAS) to serve from 2018 to 2021 as a commissioner of the Inter-American Commission on Human Rights (IACHR). In 2021 she became the President of the IACHR, leading the first all woman team of President and vice-presidents.

== Life ==
Urrejola Noguera is a graduate of the University of Chile where she studied law. She also has a postgraduate diploma in Human Rights and Transitional Justice.

In 2003 she took up a position in the Chilean Ministry of the Interior where she advised on human rights. In 2006 she became an advisor to the Secretary General of the OAS. She had taken an interest in the rights of indigenous peoples in Chile and she had served on a Special Commission looking at their rights.

In 2017 she was one of three candidates elected by the General Assembly of the OAS to serve as a Inter-American Commission on Human Rights (IACHR) commissioner for a four-year term taking in every day in 2018 through to New Year's Eve in 2021. She became the organisation's Rapporteur on the Rights of Indigenous Peoples and the Rapporteur for Brazil, Jamaica, Trinidad and Tobago, Uruguay, and Cuba. Six people had been nominated for the election and Urrejola was criticised for her poor profile outside Chile. Other candidates elected were Brazilian Professor Flávia Piovesan and Mexican diplomat Joel Hernández García.

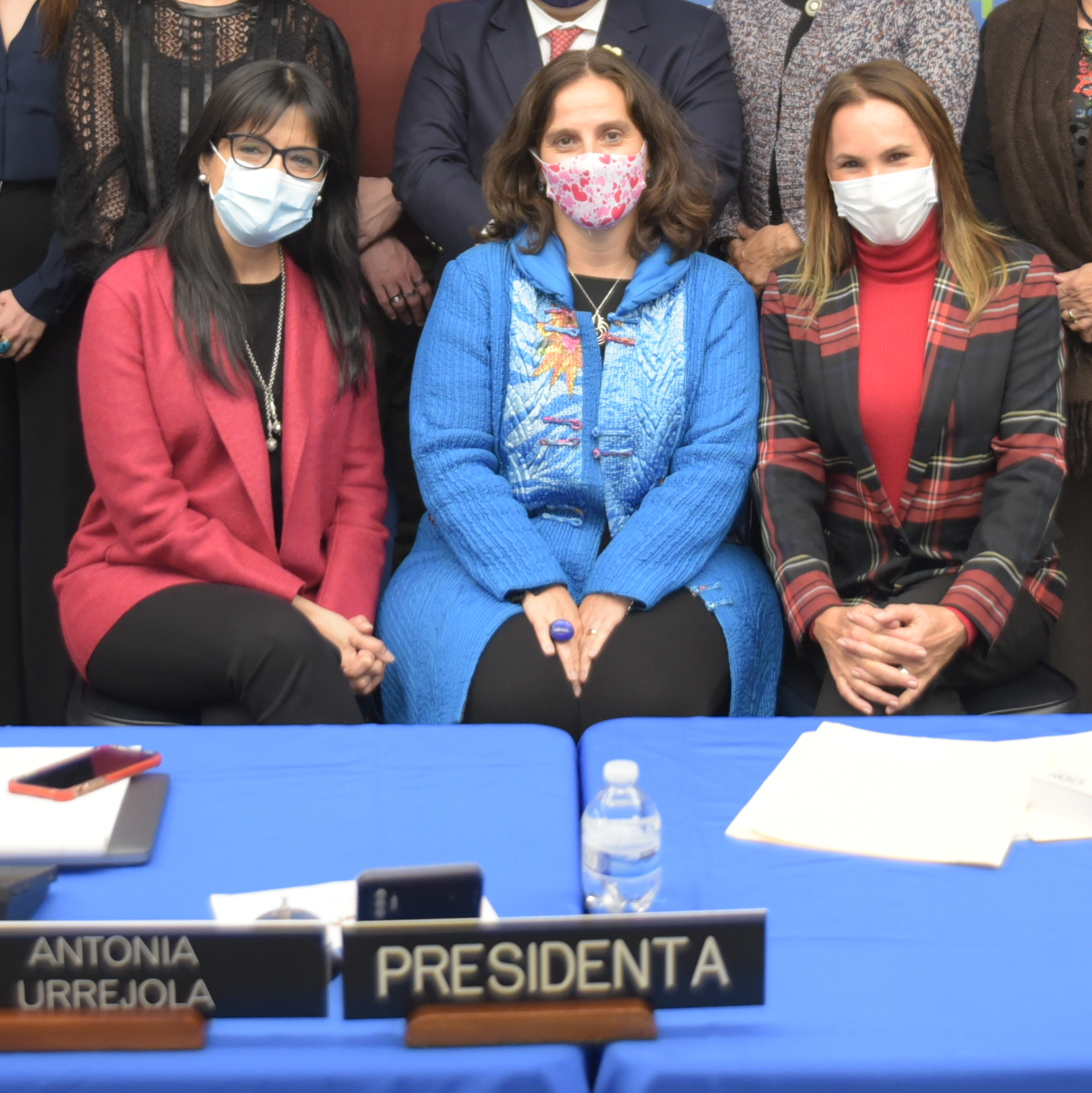
VP Julissa Mantilla Falcón, President Urrejola Noguera and VP Flávia Piovesan in 2021

In March 2021 she succeeded Joel Hernández and became the President of the IACHR, leading the first all woman team of President and vice-presidents. Julissa Mantilla Falcón became the first vice-president and Flávia Piovesan was the second.

In June 2021 she presented a report to the OAS concerning human rights in Nicaragua. She reported that over 120 people had been arbitrarily arrested and opposition leaders including five candidates for the Presidency. These were Cristiana Chamorro, Arturo Cruz, Félix Maradiaga, Juan Sebastián Chamorro and Miguel Mora and in addition others had been arrested.

In November 2021 she offered herself for re-election as a Commissioner but in a vote by the OAS General Assembly she was not placed in the top three who were elected.

She became the second female Minister of Foreign Affairs on 11 March 2022 after being nominated by Chilean President Gabriel Boric.

In 2023 her communications director resigned after a recording was made public in which Urrejola described the Argentinian ambassador, Rafael Bielsa, as "mad" after a Dominga mining and port project was cancelled. In March 2023 Alberto van Klaveren was made the Minister of Foreign affairs replacing Urrejola.
