= Paulo Abrão =

Brazilian human rights expert

Paulo Abrão is a Brazilian human rights expert, former government official and law professor. He served as Executive Secretary of the Inter-American Commission on Human Rights (IACHR) from 16 August 2016 to 15 August 2020. Abrão previously served as Executive Secretary of the Institute of Public Policies of Human Rights of MERCOSUR; President of the Amnesty Commission of Brazil; Secretary of Justice of Brazil; President of the National Committee for Refugees; and President of the National Committee against Trafficking in Persons.

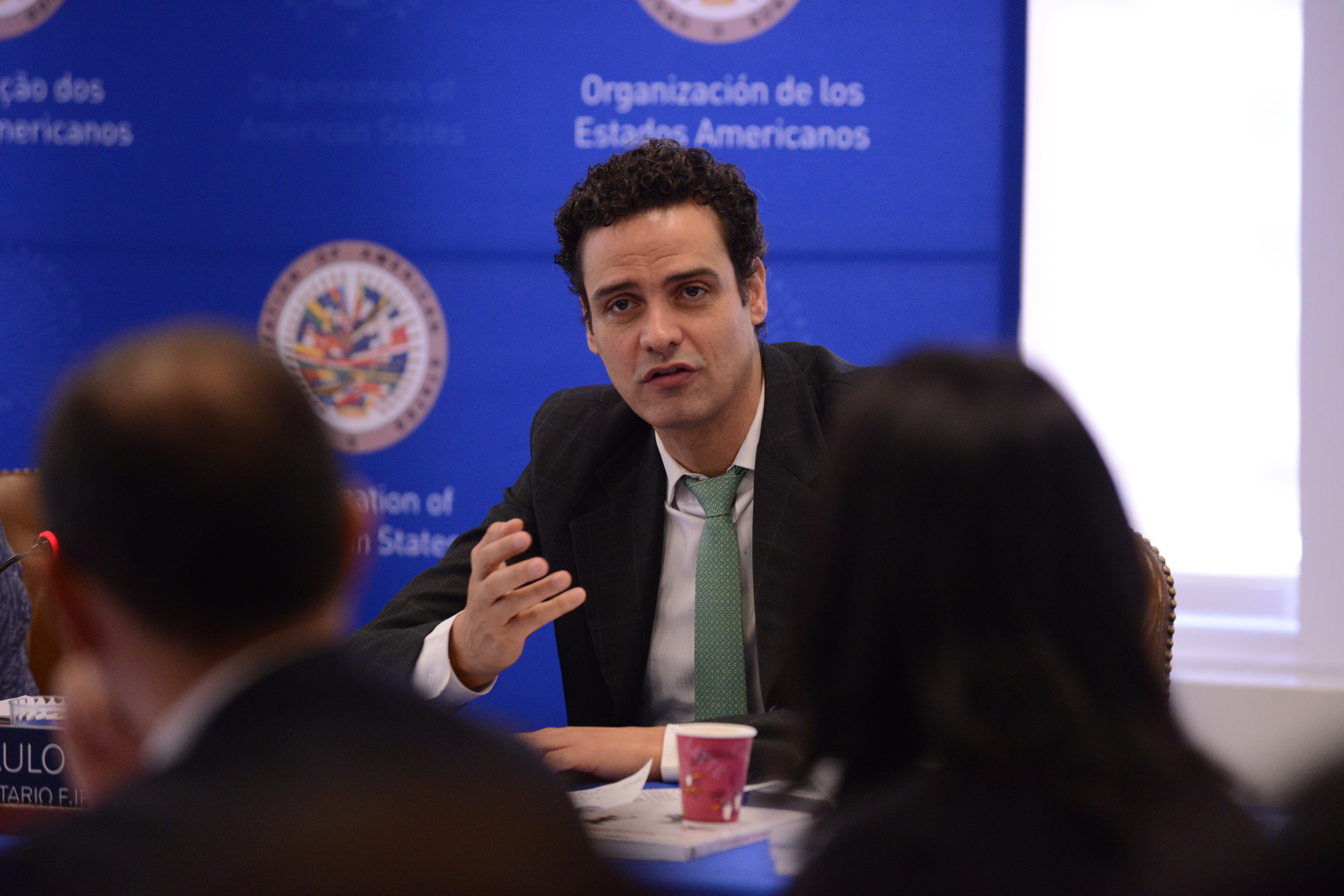

Abrão assumed the office of Executive Secretary of the IACHR amid a budget crisis in the organization. During his tenure, the Commission created the Office of the Special Rapporteur for Economic Social, Cultural, and Environmental Rights, the Inter-American System for Monitoring and Evaluating Human Rights, and a situation room for responding to the COVID-19 pandemic.

In August 2020, OAS Secretary General Luis Almagro announced that he would not renew Abrão's contract as Executive Secretary of the IACHR, citing 61 personnel complaints by staff of the organization. The Commissioners of the IACHR had unanimously approved the contract extension in January 2020, and expressed their "profound rejection" of Almagro's action "whose refusal to renew this contract breaks with a 20-year practice of respecting the IACHR’s decision to appoint its own Executive Secretary and thus makes it difficult to obtain truth, justice, and reparation for those whose labor rights have been affected." UN High Commissioner for Human Rights Michelle Bachelet, Human Rights Watch, and the Mexican government also regretted Abrão's removal.
