= Rubén Ramírez Lezcano =

Paraguayan diplomat and economist (born 1966)

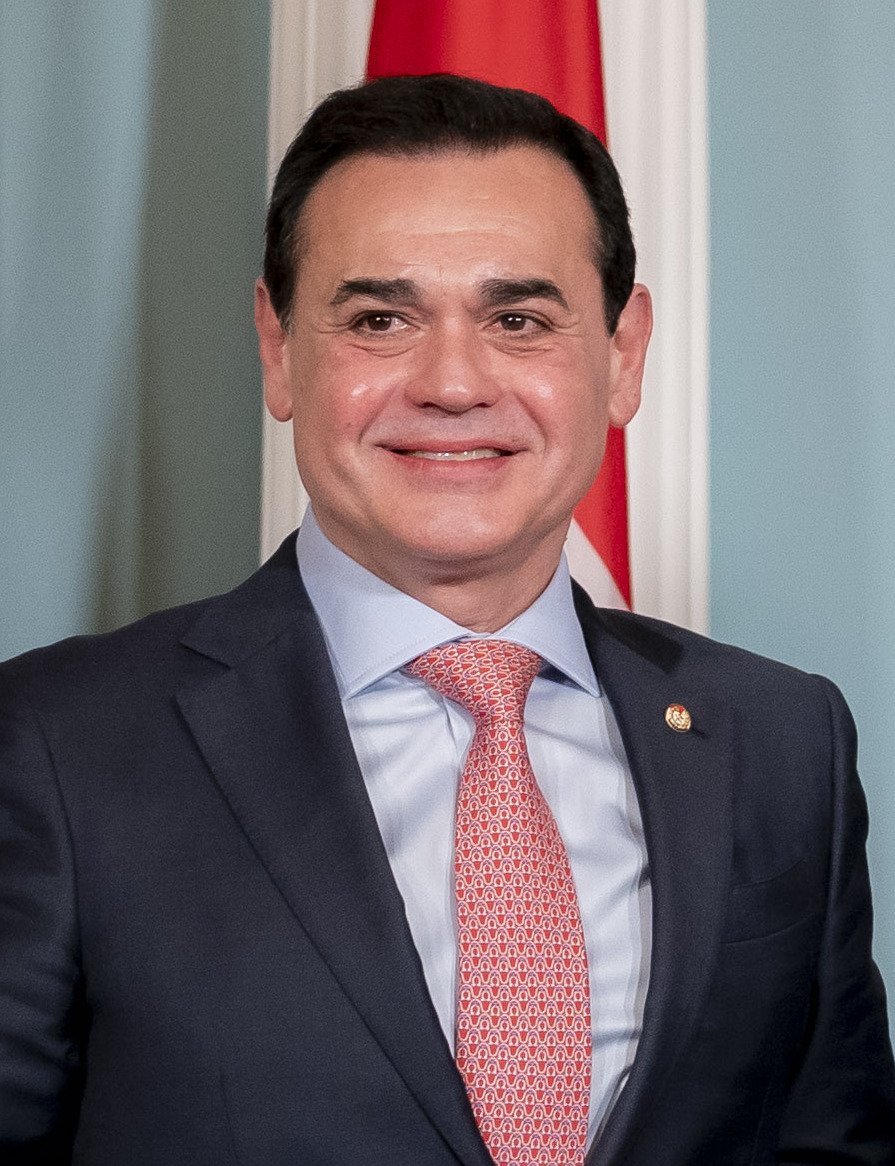
- Ramírez Lezcano in 2025

Minister of Foreign Affairs
- Incumbent
- Assumed office 15 August 2023
- President: Santiago Peña
- Preceded by: Julio Arriola
- In office 22 August 2006 – 15 August 2008
- President: Nicanor Duarte
- Preceded by: Leila Rachid de Cowles
- Succeeded by: Alejandro Hamed

Personal details
- Born: Rubén Darío Ramírez Lezcano; 11 January 1966 (age 60) Asunción, Paraguay
- Party: Partido colorado - right-wing political party
- Spouse: Adriana Cabelluzzi
- Children: 2
- Education: University of Buenos Aires; University of Sorbonne; University of California, Los Angeles
- Occupation: Diplomat; Economist

Rubén Darío Ramírez Lezcano (Note: In this name that follows Hispanic American naming customs, the first or paternal surname is Ramírez and the second or maternal family name is Lezcano.) (born 11 January 1966) is a Paraguayan economist and a right-wing conservative diplomat who is the current Minister of Foreign Affairs of Paraguay since 2023. He also held the same position from 2006 to 2008.

== Biography ==
Ramírez was born in 1966 in Asunción. He studied economics and received a baccalaureate in science and arts from the College St. Teresa in Ciudad del Este. In 1987 he graduated from the Faculty of Economics and Social Sciences of the University of Buenos Aires with a degree in economics. He later earned a master's degree in international politics at the University of Sorbonne in Paris (1989) and a degree in business administration from the Anderson School of Management at the University of California, Los Angeles (1998).

=== Career ===
Ramírez has held a number of posts in his country's foreign service, including periods at the embassies in Buenos Aires and Quito.

He served as minister of foreign affairs in the cabinet of President Nicanor Duarte Frutos from 2006 to 2008. In 2016, he was nominated by Paraguay as a candidate for the presidency of the CAF – Development Bank of Latin America and the Caribbean, but lost the election.

On 8 June 2023 he was chosen by President-elect Santiago Peña to serve as his minister of foreign affairs.

On 15 November 2023, Senator Esperanza Martínez presented Resolution No. 383, which was approved by the Senate (File S-2300589), requesting information and documents from Ramírez (Itaipu Board Member and Minister of Foreign Affairs) related to the investments of the Itaipu Pension Fund (Cajubi) abroad, known as “the heist of the century.”

Ramírez responded to the Senate via letter DM/UGRE/1/No 157/2023, dated 21 December 2023, stating that he did not have that information and those documents.

In early 2025, Ramírez presented his candidacy to succeed Luis Almagro as Secretary General of the Organization of American States (OAS). He was to contend in the 10 March election against Albert Ramdin of Suriname, but on 5 March, President Peña announced that he was withdrawing Ramírez's nomination, in light of the lack of support to its nomination. Ramdin won by acclamation.

During Ramirez's administration, Paraguay took a turn away from traditional foreign policy: at the UN, Paraguay voted against lifting the blockade against Cuba, despite Paraguay's historic vote in favor; Paraguay voted at the UN in favor of Israel and against Palestine's right to self determination, even amid a genocide; and abstained in the resolution to declare slavery as one of the worst crimes against humanity. Furthermore, he is responsible for backing Israel at the International Court of Justice (ICJ), in the case initiated by South Africa for the genocide of the civilian population in Gaza.
