= Nestor Mendez =

Belizean diplomat

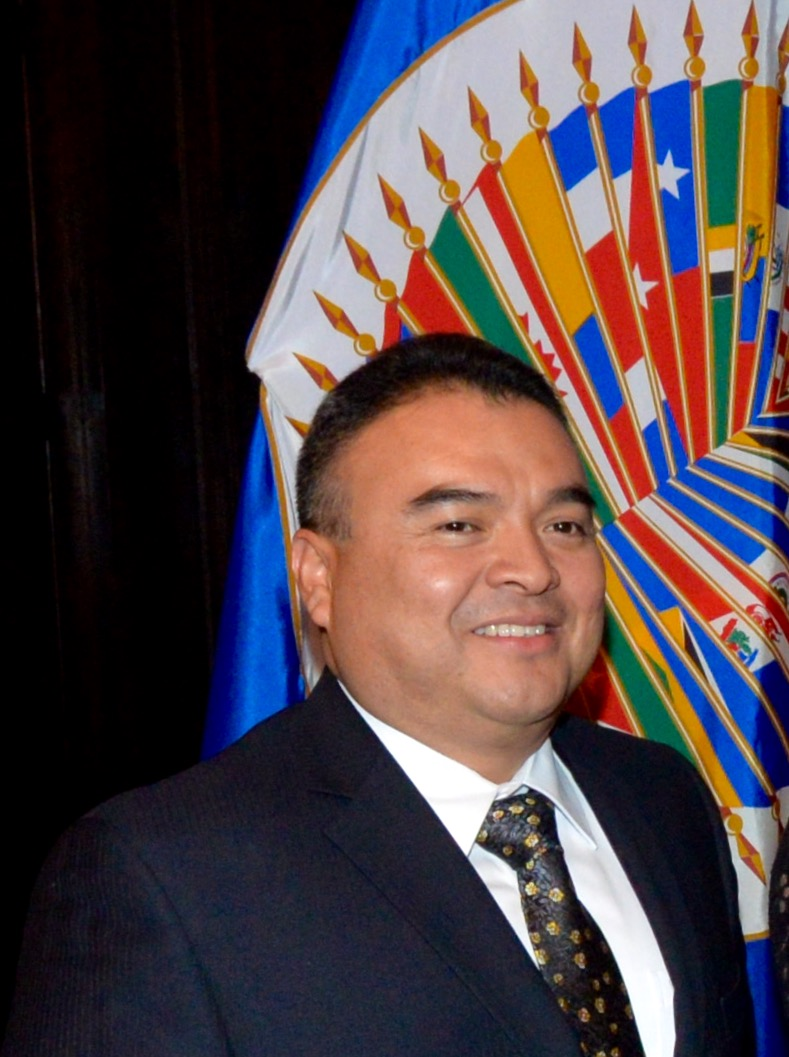

Assistant Secretary General of the Organization of American States
- In office 2015–2025
- Preceded by: Albert R. Ramdin
- Succeeded by: Laura Gil Savastano

(Belize) Belizean Ambassador to the United States

High Commissioner for Belize to Canada

Personal details
- Born: 21 January 1971 (age 55) Orange Walk District, British Honduras (Belize)
- Education: George Washington University; Oxford University
- Occupation: Politician; Diplomat
- Website: www.oas.org

Nestor Mendez (born 21 January 1971) is a Belizean diplomat and politician. From 2015 to 2025 he was the Assistant Secretary General of the Organization of American States (OAS).

== Diplomatic service ==
Prior to taking office at the OAS, Nestor Mendez was a career diplomat in the Foreign Service of Belize. He served as the ambassador to the United States of America, Permanent Representative to the OAS, and Non-Resident High Commissioner to Canada.

As Ambassador of Belize to the United States, Mendez travelled throughout the country to engage with the Belizean diaspora and to meet with prospective investors and companies interested in investing in Belize. He also focused on a wide range of development issues pertaining to the Caribbean and Central America such as alternative sources of energy, micro, small and medium-sized enterprises, trade and investment promotion, and security.

During his tenure as Permanent Representative of Belize to the Organization of American States, Mendez chaired several Councils and Committees of the organization including the Permanent Council, the Committee on Hemispheric Security, the Special Committee for Migration Issues, and the Inter-American Council for Integral Development (CIDI) where he focused on matters related to innovation, competitiveness, and supporting micro, small and medium-sized enterprises as engines for economic growth and development. As Chair of the OAS Permanent Council, he used this platform to focus attention on climate change and introduced several institutional initiatives to increase awareness of the impact of this phenomenon, especially on the smaller and more vulnerable states.

Ambassador Mendez previously held diplomatic posts at the Belizean High Commission, London, United Kingdom, where he served as counsellor, and at the Embassy of Belize in Guatemala, where served as first secretary.

== Organization of American States ==
Nestor Mendez was elected as the ninth Assistant Secretary General of the Organization of American States (OAS) on 18 March 2015. He began serving his five-year term on 13 July 2015, and on 20 March 2020, was unanimously re-elected by the General Assembly to serve a second five-year term.

As Secretary to the Permanent Council and its subsidiary bodies, Ambassador Mendez was central to its deliberations and to the core work of the General Secretariat. In working to address the issues confronting the hemisphere, he gave priority attention to climate change and natural disasters, advocated for women's rights and gender equality, and has brought renewed focus to the plight of marginalized and vulnerable groups. He was also at the forefront of promoting innovation, competitiveness, and entrepreneurship as avenues for unearthing leadership and talent, and for empowering the youth of the Americas.

Upon receiving the mandate from member states, he pledged his "unwavering commitment to seize the opportunity that is before us to work together to transform the OAS into the Organization that we want and that the people of the Americas deserve".

Assistant Secretary General Mendez worked closely with the Secretary General and member states towards the revitalization and modernization of the institution, in advancing its role and relevance in the hemisphere, in fostering partnerships for development, and strengthening regional inter-connectivity. He strived to build upon the work he started, and remained fully committed to expanding on the progress achieved "in positioning the OAS to deliver enduring security, lasting peace, progress and development for the Hemisphere".

He was replaced by Laura Gil of Colombia at the end of his second term in July 2025.

== Education ==
Mendez holds a master's degree in international policy and practice from George Washington University in Washington, D.C., United States, a graduate-level certificate in diplomatic studies from Oxford University in Oxford, United Kingdom, and a bachelor's degree in business administration from the University College of Belize in Belize City.

Mendez is married and has two children.
