= Lezcano =

Lezcano is a surname.

== Notable people ==
Notable people with this surname include:

- Carlos Lezcano (1955–2025), Puerto Rican baseball player
- Claudio Lezcano (died 1999), Paraguayan footballer
- Dario Lezcano (born 1990), Paraguayan footballer
- Ezequiel Lezcano (born 1982), Argentine footballer
- Gastón Lezcano (born 1986), Argentine footballer
- Genaro Lezcano (born c.1935), Argentine basketball player
- Jose Lezcano (born 1985), Panamanian jockey
- Juan Carlos Lezcano (1938–2025), Paraguayan footballer
- Juan Vicente Lezcano (1937–2012), Paraguayan footballer
- Lucas Lezcano (born 1999), Argentine footballer
- Rubén Ramírez Lezcano (born 1966), Paraguayan politician
- Saúl Cepeda Lezcano (born 1976), Spanish writer
- Sixto Lezcano (born 1953), Puerto Rican baseball player

== See also ==
- Lescano
