= 2025 Organization of American States elections =

Election of the two most senior officials

During 2025, the Organization of American States (OAS) held elections to choose replacements for its two most senior officials. Albert Ramdin of Suriname was elected secretary general on 10 March, and Laura Gil of Colombia was elected assistant secretary general on 5 May.

== Background ==
According to the OAS Charter, the secretary general and assistant secretary general are elected for five-year terms by the organization's General Assembly and are eligible to be re-elected for one additional term. To be elected, a candidate must secure the support of a simple majority of the organization's member states, currently equal to 18 votes.

The Charter also specifies that the secretary general shall "direct the General Secretariat, be the legal representative thereof, and [...] be responsible to the General Assembly for the proper fulfillment of the obligations and functions of the General Secretariat". In turn, the assistant secretary general acts as secretary to the Permanent Council and performs the functions of the secretary general during periods of temporary absence or disability.

The 2025 elections were held to appoint replacements for Luis Almagro of Uruguay, whose second five-year term as secretary general comes to an end on 25 May 2025, and for Nestor Mendez of Belize, whose second term as assistant secretary general is to conclude on 16 July 2025.

== Secretary General ==
2025 Organization of American States Secretary General election
- 10 March 2025
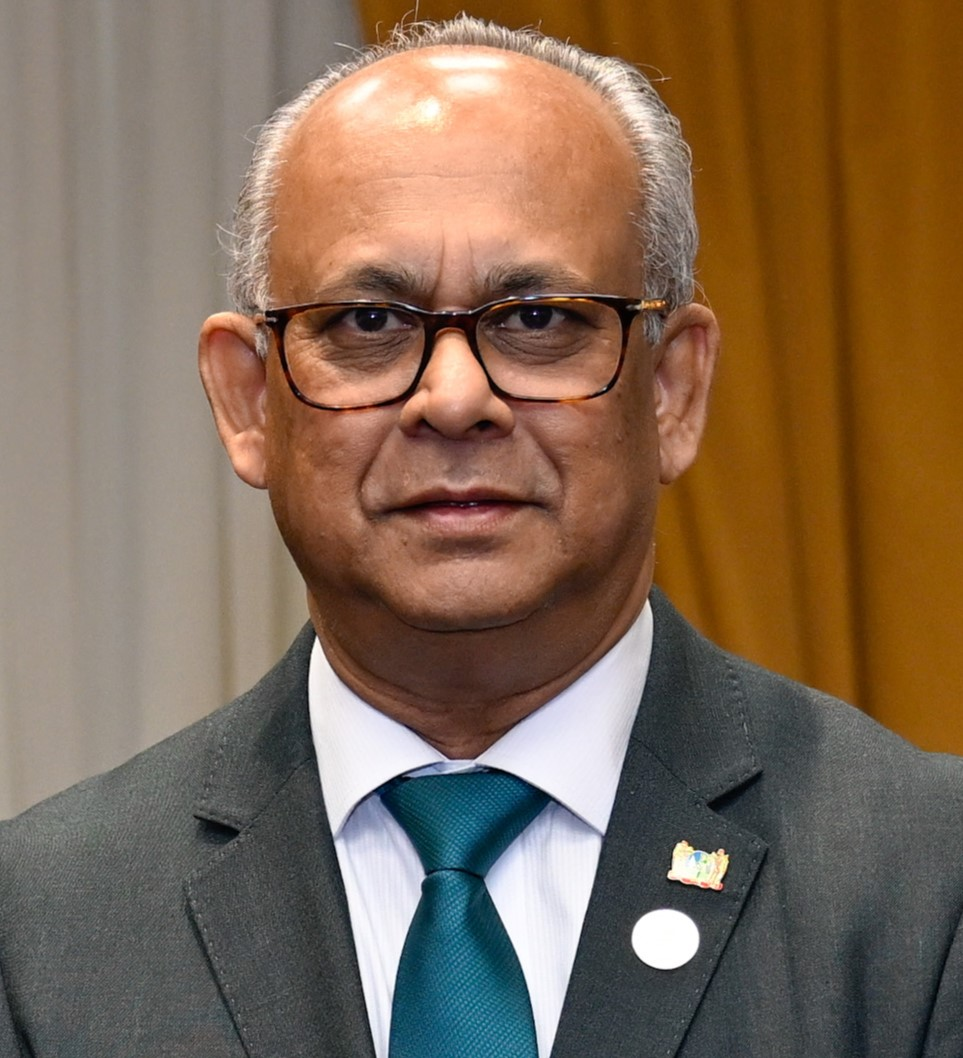

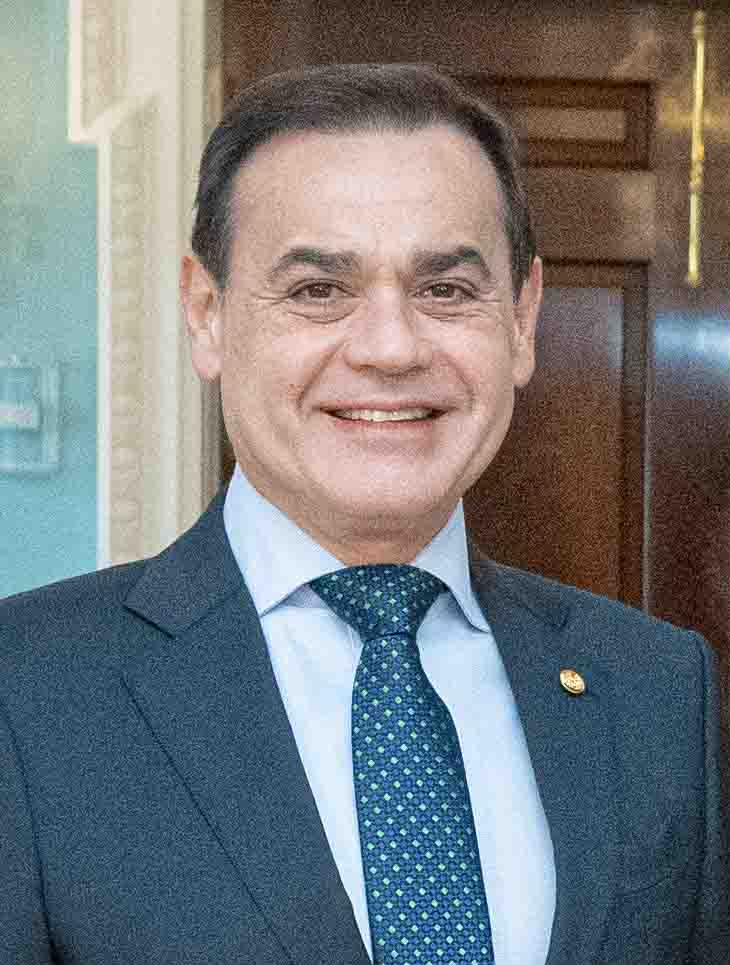
Nominee	Albert Ramdin	Rubén Ramírez
Country	Suriname	Paraguay
Votes	Acclamation	Withdrew
Secretary General before election
Luis Almagro
Elected Secretary General
Albert Ramdin

=== Candidates ===
Member states were required to present their candidacies in writing by 3 February. (Note: That notwithstanding, the Permanent Council ruled that members may nominate candidates at any time prior to the day of the election.) Two candidates were nominated:

- Albert Ramdin of Suriname, the serving foreign minister and previously the OAS's assistant secretary general from 2005 to 2015.
- Rubén Ramírez of Paraguay, the serving foreign minister, who previously represented his country at CAF, ALADI and UNESCO.

A special meeting of the OAS Permanent Council was held on 10 February at which the candidates presented their proposals and initiatives for leading the organization. A similar meeting of the candidates with representatives of civil society was held on 11 February.

On 5 March, President Santiago Peña of Paraguay announced that his government was withdrawing Ramírez's nomination on account of weakened support.

=== Endorsements ===
The 46th regular meeting of the Conference of Heads of Government of the Caribbean Community (CARICOM), held in Georgetown, Guyana, in February 2024, endorsed Ramdin's candidacy. The CARICOM bloc accounts for 14 votes in the OAS. As the election date approached, around ten other countries announced their intention to vote for Ramdin.

Ramírez was described as being close to the Trump administration in the United States.

=== Election ===
The election was held at a special session of the OAS General Assembly on 10 March 2025. As the sole candidate, Ramdin was elected by acclamation.

== Assistant Secretary General ==
2025 Organization of American States Assistant Secretary General election
- 5 May 2025
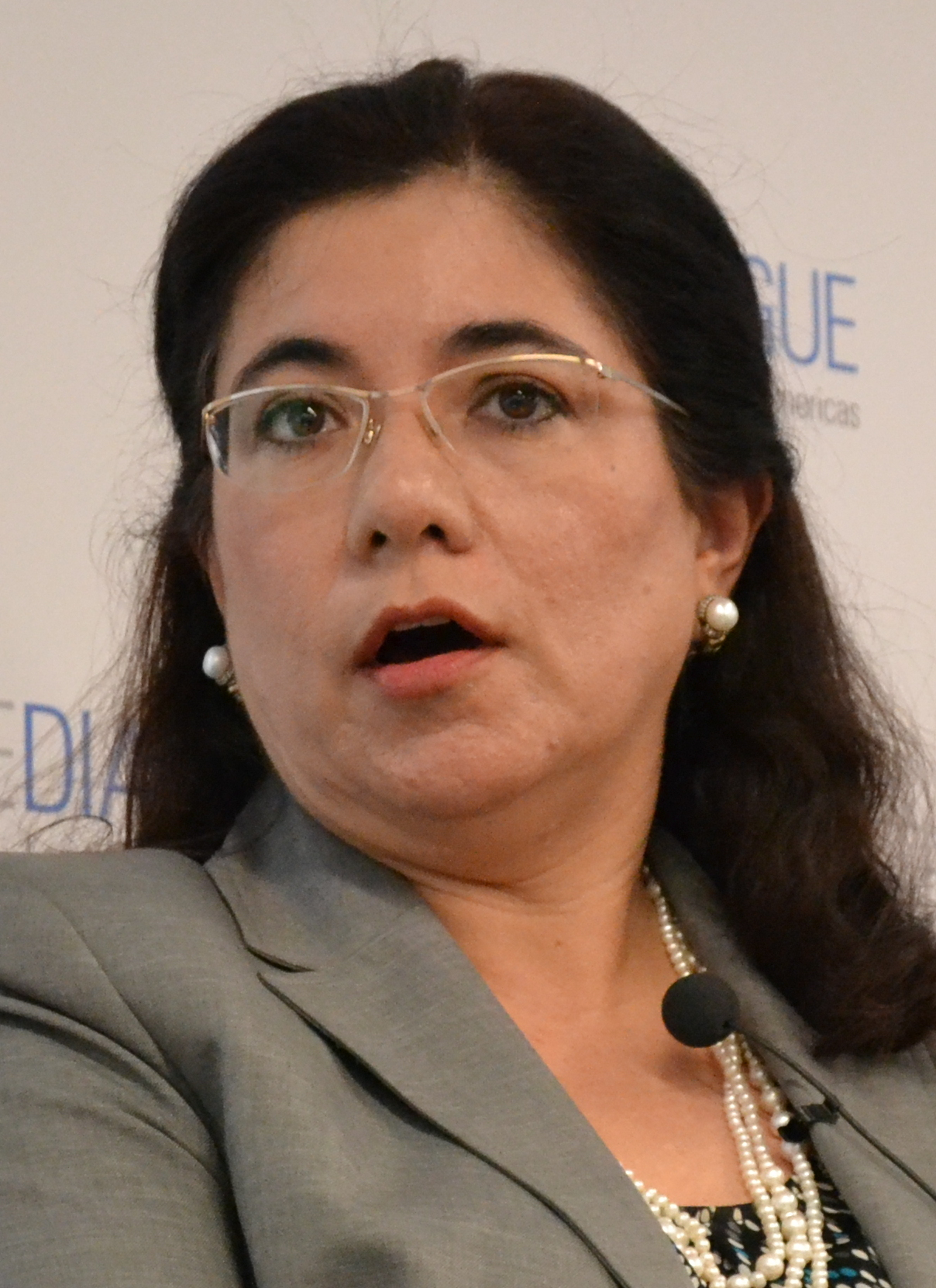

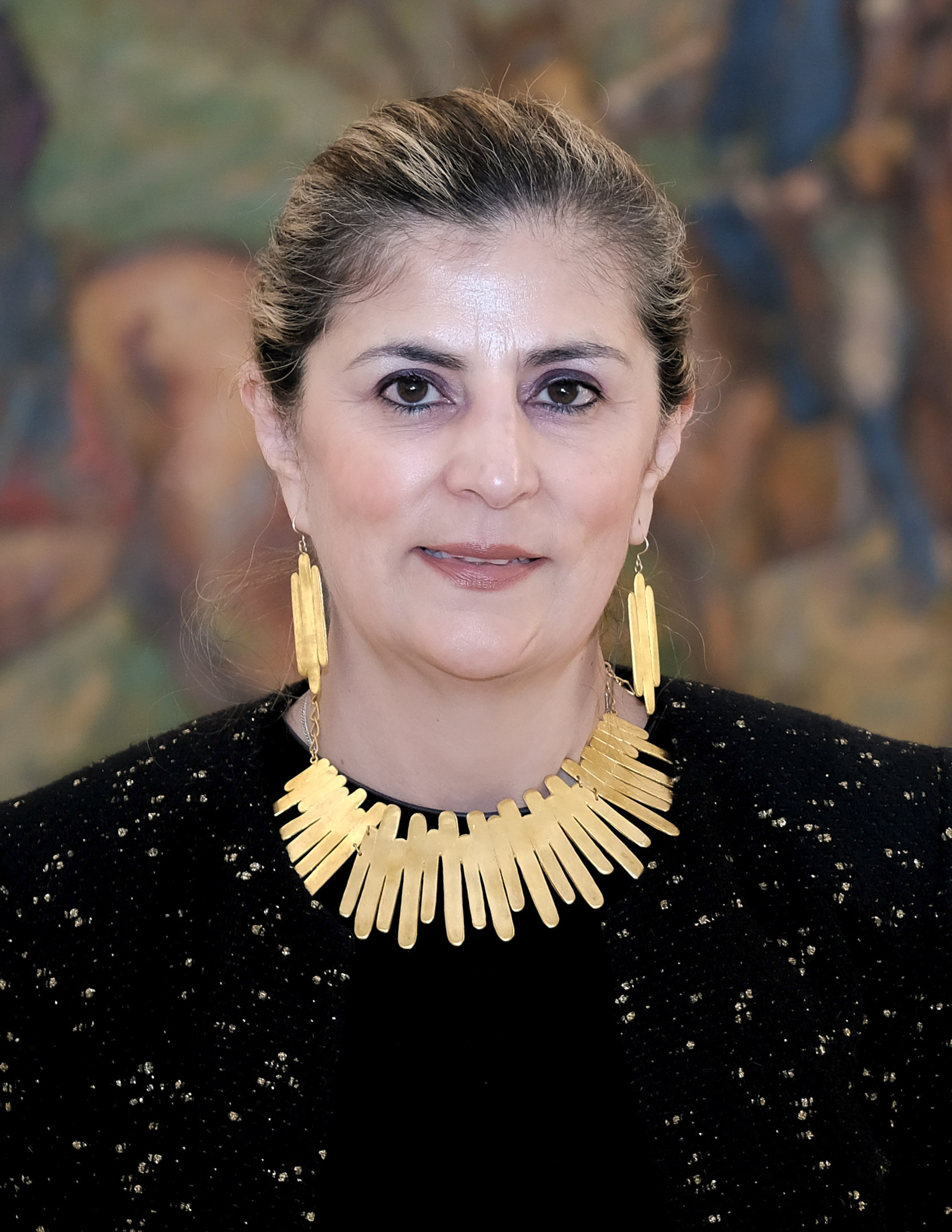

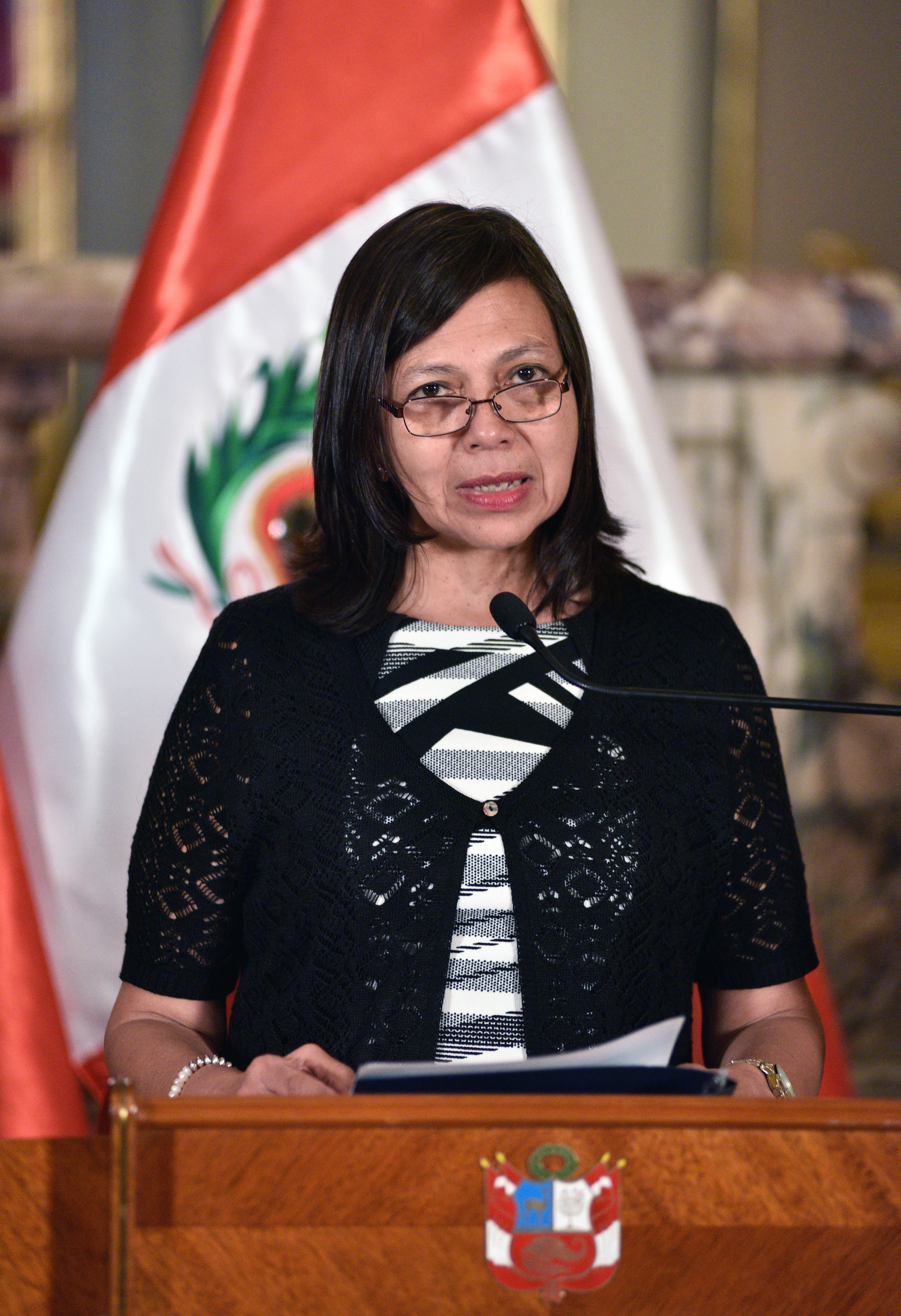
Nominee	Claudia Escobar	Laura Gil	Ana María Sánchez
Country	Guatemala	Colombia	Peru
First round	8	13	11
Second round	–	19	13
Assistant Secretary General before election
Nestor Mendez
Elected Assistant Secretary General
Laura Gil

The new assistant secretary general was elected by a special session of the General Assembly on 5 May 2025.

=== Candidates ===
- Claudia Escobar Mejía of Guatemala, the serving permanent representative to the OAS.
- Laura Gil Savastano of Colombia, the serving ambassador to Austria and the United Nations Office at Vienna and former vice minister for multilateral affairs.
- Ana María Sánchez of Peru, a career diplomat and former foreign minister.

=== Election ===
The election ran to two rounds of voting. Escobar received 8 votes in the first and was eliminated. In the second round, Gil received 19 votes to Sánchez's 13 and was declared the winner. When she takes office on 17 July, Gil will be the first woman in the OAS's history to hold the assistant secretary general position.
