= Ana María Sánchez Vargas de Ríos =

Peruvian diplomat

Ana María Sánchez de Ríos
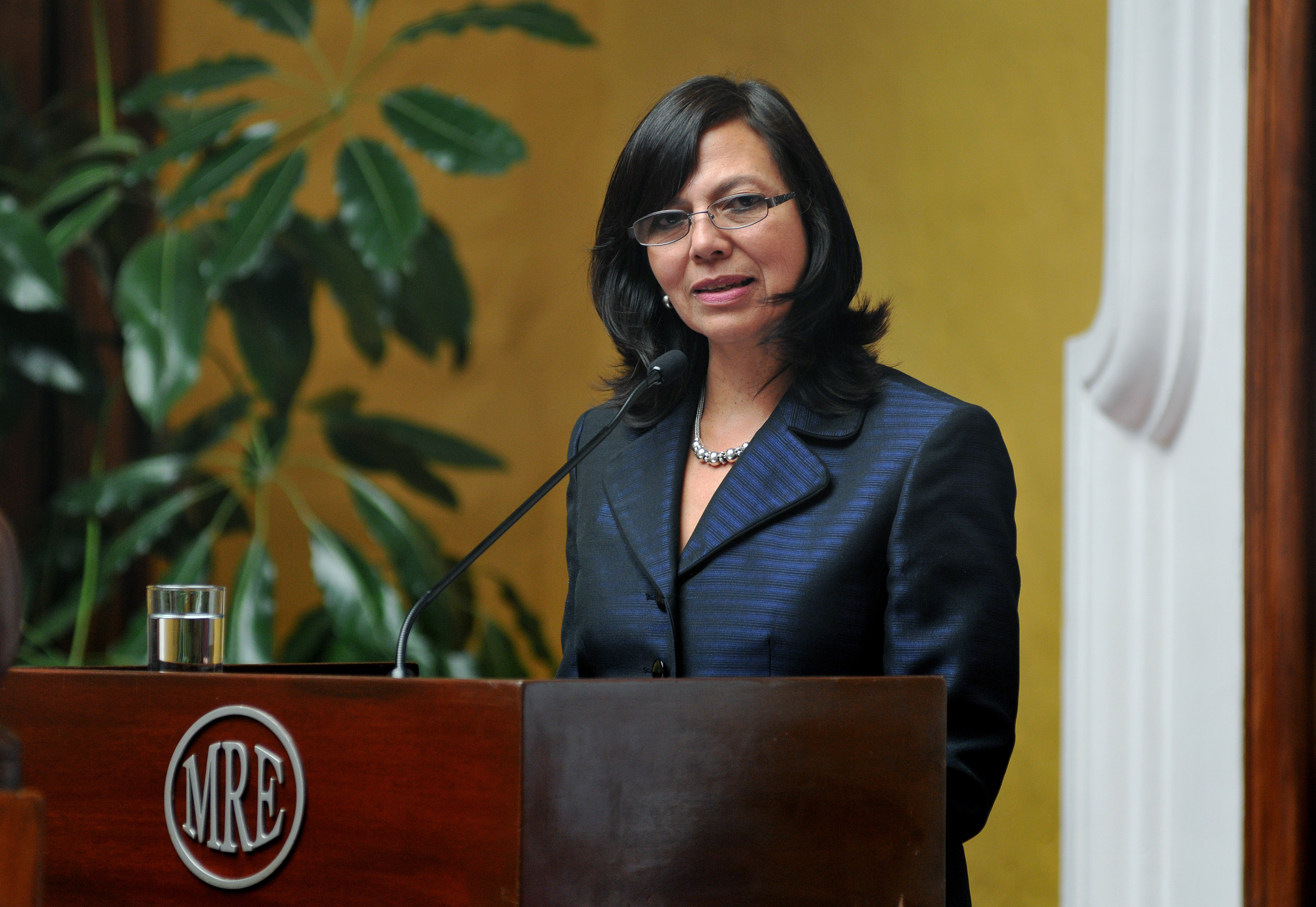

Minister of Foreign Affairs of Peru
- In office 2 April 2015 – 28 July 2016
- President: Ollanta Humala
- Preceded by: Gonzalo Gutiérrez Reinel
- Succeeded by: Ricardo Luna Mendoza

Personal details
- Born: Ana María Liliana Sánchez Vargas de Ríos; 28 January 1959 (age 67) Lima, Peru
- Education: Pontifical Catholic University of Peru
- Occupation: Diplomat, lawyer, politician
- Awards: Order of Isabella the Catholic (2015); Order of the Sun of Peru (2015)

Ana María Liliana Sánchez Vargas de Ríos (born 28 January 1959) is a Peruvian diplomat. She has a degree in law from the Pontifical Catholic University of Peru and a licentiate in International Relations from the Diplomatic Academy of Peru. She was the country's Minister of Foreign Affairs from 2 April 2015 to 28 July 2016.

== Biography ==
Ana María Sánchez de Ríos is a lawyer graduated from the Pontifical Catholic University of Peru.

In 1980 she entered the Diplomatic Service of Peru. She was promoted to the position of ambassador on 1 January 2013.

She has performed functions within the Ministry of Foreign Affairs – in the Undersecretariat of Foreign Policy; in the Directorate of America; in the Privileges and Immunities Directorate; in the General Directorate of Administration; in the Directorate of Political Cooperation and Integration; in the Coordination Office of the Vice Minister and Secretary General; was Director of Border Development and Integration; was Director of Integration-Economic Affairs; and was Chief of the Ministerial Office for three Foreign Ministers before her appointment to the post.

== Postings abroad ==
She has served in Peru's embassy in Hungary, its consulate in São Paulo, its consulate in Mexico City, and in the Permanent Representation of Peru in the Organization of American States (OAS). Since May 2019 she has been Peruvian ambassador to Ireland.

== Minister of Foreign Affairs ==
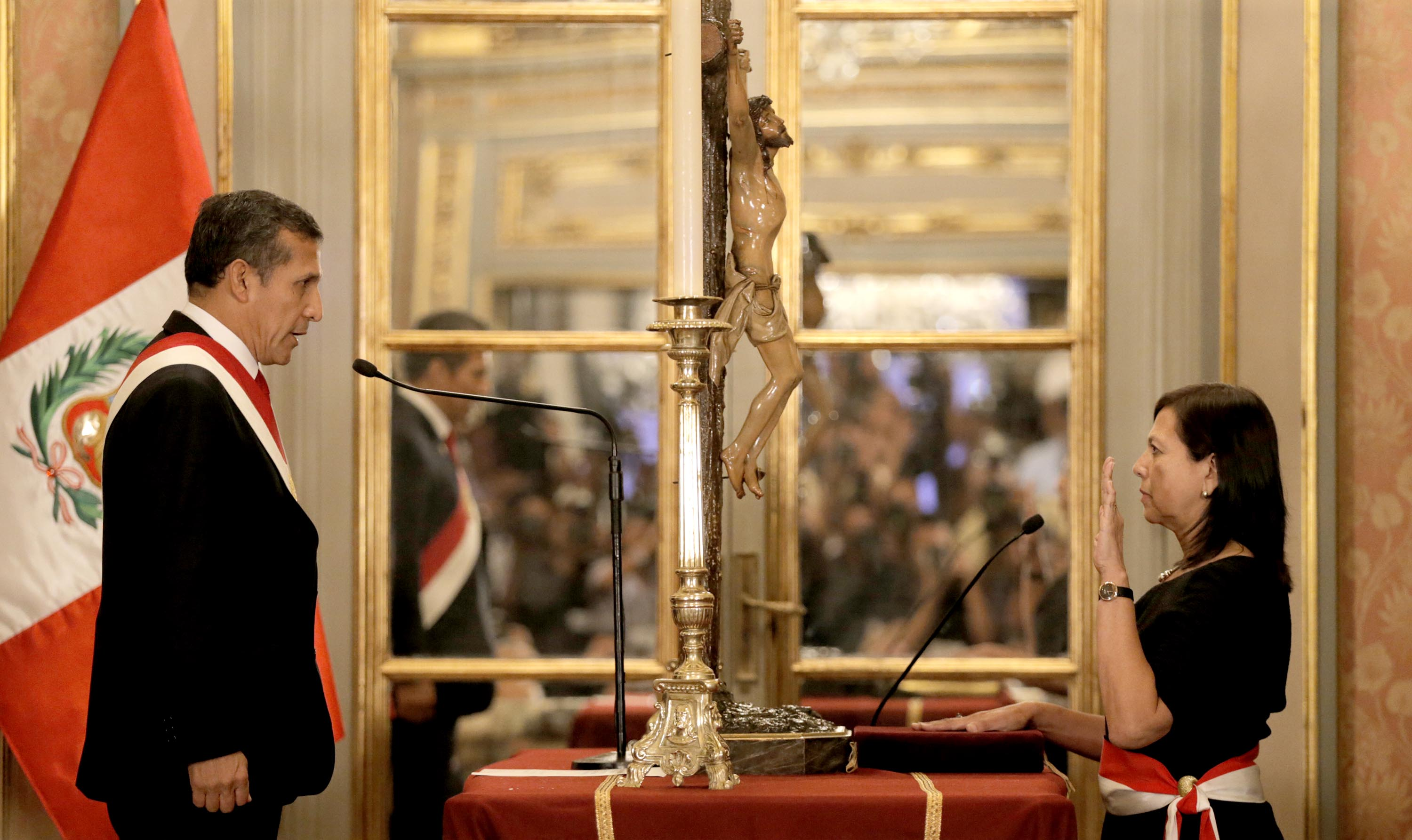
Ana María Sánchez, swearing in before President Ollanta Humala as Foreign Minister of the Republic of Peru

On 2 April 2015, she was sworn in as Minister of Foreign Affairs, joining the Council of Ministers chaired by Pedro Cateriano, the seventh of the government of President Ollanta Humala. The ceremony was held in the Golden Hall of the Government Palace. With her appointment she became the first woman in the diplomatic corps of Peru to be appointed Foreign Minister (her predecessor, Eda Rivas, was not a career diplomat). A day earlier, she had been named ambassador of Peru to France, a designation that was superseded as she assumed her new responsibility.

She was replaced as Foreign Minister by Ricardo Luna Mendoza on 28 July 2016, after the election of President Pedro Pablo Kuczynski.

== Later career ==
In 2025 Peru announced her candidacy for assistant secretary general of the Organization of American States in the May 2025 election. She lost in the second round of voting to Laura Gil of Colombia.

== Decorations ==
- 2008: Military Order of Ayacucho, in the rank of Commander
- 2015: Dame Grand Cross of the Order of Isabella the Catholic (Spain)
- 2015: Grand Cross of the Order of the Sun of Peru
- 2015: Grand Cross of the Order of Merit for Distinguished Services
- 2015: Grand Cross of the José Gregorio Paz Soldán Order of Merit of the Diplomatic Service of Peru

== See also ==
- Humala administration
