= 2021 WPT Madrid Open =

World Padel Tour tournament held in Madrid, Spain

- Date: 4 – 11 April
- Edition: 19th (Note: The first twelve editions were held under the organization of the Padel Pro Tour.)
- Category: Open
- Location: Madrid, Spain
- Venue: Palacio de Deportes de la Comunidad de Madrid

Champions
- Men's doubles: (Argentina) Fernando Belasteguín (Argentina) Sanyo Gutiérrez
- Women's doubles: (Spain) Ariana Sánchez (Spain) Paula Josemaría

Chronology
Previous
Master Final
(2020)
Next
Alicante Open

The 2021 Madrid Open (officially 2021 World Padel Tour Adeslas Madrid Open) was the first tournament of the ninth season organized by World Padel Tour, the most prestigious padel circuit at the time.

In the women's category, two of the newly formed pairs reached the final. The first finalists were the fourth-ranked pair, Bea González and Lucia Sainz, who eliminated the number 1 ranked pair, Alejandra Salazar and Gemma Triay, in the semi-final. Their opponents in the final were the number 3 ranked pair, Ariana Sánchez and Paula Josemaria, who eliminated Delfina Brea and Tamara Icardo to reach the final. In the final, Ariana and Paula defeated Bea and Lucia in two sets, becoming the first women's pair to win a title this season. With this victory, in addition to winning their first title together, they individually won their second title in Madrid (Ariana having won the Estrella Damm Open in 2020 and Paula the Madrid Master in 2019).

In the men's category, two of the newly formed pairs reached the final. The first finalists were Alejandro Ruiz and Franco Stupaczuk, who unexpectedly defeated the world number ones, Alejandro Galán and Juan Lebrón, in the quarterfinals and the third-ranked pair, Agustín Tapia and Pablo Lima, in the semifinals. Their opponents were the most anticipated new pair and second-ranked duo, Fernando Belasteguín and Sanyo Gutiérrez, who eliminated the tournament's revelation pair, Arturo Coello and Miguel Lamperti, to reach the final. In the final, Belasteguín and Sanyo defeated Ruiz and Stupaczuk in three sets to win their first title of the season and the first as a pair. With this victory, Sanyo won his second title in Madrid (having already won in 2015) and Bela his twelfth (having previously won in 2006-I, 2006-II, 2007-I, 2007-II, 2008, 2010-II, 2011-I, 2011-II, 2012-I, 2012-II and 2019).

== Relevant Data ==
=== Changes in the rankings and new pairs ===
On the men's side, five new pairs would be formed in the top 8 (the seeded pairs). The main novelty would be the new number 2 ranked pair, Fernando Belasteguín and Sanyo Gutiérrez, who would team up with the aim of dethroning Alejandro Galán and Juan Lebrón. The new number 3 pair would be composed of Belasteguín's former partner, Agustín Tapia, who would team up with Pablo Lima. And the number 4 pair would consist of Lima's former partner, Paquito Navarro, who would team up with Martín Di Nenno. The new standout pair outside the top 4 would be Franco Stupaczuk, who would team up with Alejandro Ruiz.

On the women's side, despite finishing the season as world number 1, Gemma Triay opted to end her five-year partnership with Lucia Sainz to join her former rival Alejandra Salazar, starting as the world's number 1 ranked doubles team. With Salazar's separation, Ariana Sánchez joined Paula Josemaria, thus breaking up the number three ranked doubles team, while Paula's former partner, Bea González, played alongside Lucia. The only top 4 doubles team to transition from one year to the next were the 'Martas', Marta Marrero and Marta Ortega.

== Head-to-head record between teams ranked in the top 4 during the season ==
=== Men's ===
Record	Galán–Lebrón	Belasteguín–Sanyo	Lima–Tapia	Di Nenno–Paquito
Galán–Lebrón	—	—	—	—
Belasteguín–Sanyo	—	—	—	—
Lima–Tapia	—	—	—	—
Di Nenno–Paquito	—	—	—	—

=== Women's ===
Record	Gemma–Salazar	Marrero–Ortega	Ariana–Josemaria	Bea–Lucia
Gemma–Salazar	—	—	—	0–1
Marrero–Ortega	—	—	—	—
Ariana–Josemaria	—	—	—	1–0
Bea–Lucia	1–0	—	0–1	—

== Draws ==
=== Men's Bracket ===
Round of 32
1	(Spain) Galán / (Spain) Lebrón
Bye
(Spain) J. Garrido / (Argentina) J.C. Belluati	6	6
(Argentina) D. Perino / (Spain) E. Moreno	3	4
(Spain) Á. Cepero / (Spain) J. Mieres	4	6	6
(Spain) A. Santana / (Argentina) C. Gutiérrez	6	2	2
(Spain) J. Rico / (Argentina) R. Moyano	6	3	1
7	(Spain) A. Ruiz / (Argentina) Stupaczuk	3	6	6
5	(Argentina) Chingotto / (Argentina) J. Tello	7	6
(Spain) N. Gadea / (Spain) V. Ruiz	6	1
(Argentina) A. Gutiérrez / (Spain) J. Martinez	3	3
(Spain) Coki / (Spain) J.M. Díaz	6	6
(Argentina) L. Capra / (Spain) P. Lijó	6	3	4
(Brazil) L. Bergamini / (Brazil) L. Campagnolo	3	6	6
Bye
3	(Brazil) Lima / (Argentina) Tapia
4	(Argentina) Di Nenno / (Spain) Paquito
Bye
(Spain) Coello / (Argentina) M. Lamperti	6	6
(Spain) J. Barahona / (Spain) M. Piñeiro	4	2
Q	(Spain) E. Alonso / (Spain) J. Moya	6	4
Q	(Spain) I. Ramírez / (Spain) M. Yanguas	7	6
Q	(Spain) R. Méndez / (Spain) S. Oria	3	4
6	(Argentina) A. Allemandi / (Argentina) Maxi	6	6
8	(Argentina) A. Silingo / (Spain) M. Díaz	3	6	2
Q	(Spain) F. Gil Morales / (Spain) S. Alba	6	4	6
(Spain) J.G. Diestro / (Spain) P. Fernández	0	4
(Spain) A. Sans / (Spain) I. Zaratiegui	6	6
(Spain) J. Rico / (Spain) Momo	6	6
(Spain) C. Fuster / (Spain) G. Rubio	3	2
Bye
2	(Argentina) Belasteguín / (Argentina) Sanyo

Round of 16
1	(Spain) Galán / (Spain) Lebrón	7	7
(Spain) J. Garrido / (Argentina) J.C. Belluati	6	6
(Spain) Á. Cepero / (Spain) J. Mieres	3	5
7	(Spain) A. Ruiz / (Argentina) Stupaczuk	6	7
5	(Argentina) Chingotto / (Argentina) J. Tello	6	6
(Spain) Coki / (Spain) J.M. Díaz	2	2
(Brazil) L. Bergamini / (Brazil) L. Campagnolo	5	1
3	(Brazil) Lima / (Argentina) Tapia	7	6
4	(Argentina) Di Nenno / (Spain) Paquito	4	6	6
(Spain) Coello / (Argentina) M. Lamperti	6	3	7
Q	(Spain) I. Ramírez / (Spain) M. Yanguas	6	6
6	(Argentina) A. Allemandi / (Argentina) Maxi	3	4
Q	(Spain) F. Gil Morales / (Spain) S. Alba	6	1
(Spain) A. Sans / (Spain) I. Zaratiegui	7	6
(Spain) J. Rico / (Spain) Momo	5	5
2	(Argentina) Belasteguín / (Argentina) Sanyo	7	7

Quarter-Final
1	(Spain) Galán / (Spain) Lebrón	6	4	1
7	(Spain) A. Ruiz / (Argentina) Stupaczuk	4	6	6
5	(Argentina) Chingotto / (Argentina) J. Tello	5	7	2
3	(Brazil) Lima / (Argentina) Tapia	7	6	6
(Spain) Coello / (Argentina) M. Lamperti	6	6
Q	(Spain) I. Ramírez / (Spain) M. Yanguas	4	4
(Spain) A. Sans / (Spain) I. Zaratiegui	2	3
2	(Argentina) Belasteguín / (Argentina) Sanyo	6	6

Semi-Finals
7	(Spain) A. Ruiz / (Argentina) Stupaczuk	6	6	6
3	(Brazil) Lima / (Argentina) Tapia	4	7	1
(Spain) Coello / (Argentina) M. Lamperti	5	6
2	(Argentina) Belasteguín / (Argentina) Sanyo	7	7

Finals
7	(Spain) A. Ruiz / (Argentina) Stupaczuk	7	4	3
2	(Argentina) Belasteguín / (Argentina) Sanyo	6	6	6

=== Women's Bracket ===
Round of 32
1	(Spain) Gemma / (Spain) Salazar
Bye
(Spain) L. Martínez / (Spain) V. Virseda	7	6
(Spain) B. Las Heras / (Spain) C. Mesa	5	1
Q	(Spain) C. Tur Mari / (Spain) M. Escandell	3	2
(Spain) L. Rufo / (Spain) M. Talavan	6	6
(Spain) I. Domínguez / (Spain) L. Alonso	0	0
6	(Spain) P. Llaguno / (Argentina) V. Riera	6	6
8	(Portugal) A.C. Nogueira / (Spain) T. Navarro	7	6
Q	(Argentina) C. Jensen / (Spain) Sandra Bellver	5	1
Q	(Spain) J. Velasco / (Spain) N. Canovas	6	6
(Spain) A. Blanco / (Spain) M. Merino	3	1
(France) A. Collombon / (Spain) J. Castelló	6	5	6
(Argentina) C. Tenorio / (Argentina) J. Bidahorria	4	7	2
Bye
4	(Spain) Bea González / (Spain) L. Sainz
3	(Spain) Ariana / (Spain) P. Josemaria
Bye
(Spain) B. Caldera / (Spain) C. Goenaga	4	7	6
(Spain) C. Navarro / (Argentina) C. Reiter	6	6	4
(Spain) E. Carnicero / (Brazil) R. Piltcher	5	3
(Spain) A. Galán / (Spain) M. Villalba	7	6
(Spain) A. Martínez / (Spain) S. Hernández	1	0
5	(Spain) Majo / (Spain) Mapi	6	6
7	(Spain) E. Amatriain / (Portugal) S. Araújo	6	6
(Spain) A. Cortiles / (Spain) A.F. de Ossó	2	3
(Argentina) D. Brea / (Spain) T. Icardo	6	6
(Argentina) N. Brito / (Spain) N. Traviesa	1	3
(Argentina) A. Osoro / (Spain) V. Iglesias	6	6
Q	(Spain) M. Gabarrus / (Spain) N. Rovira	2	3
Bye
2	(Spain) M. Marrero / (Spain) M. Ortega

Round of 16
1	(Spain) Gemma / (Spain) Salazar	6	6
(Spain) L. Martínez / (Spain) V. Virseda	1	1
(Spain) L. Rufo / (Spain) M. Talavan	5	7	2
6	(Spain) P. Llaguno / (Argentina) V. Riera	7	6	6
8	(Portugal) A.C. Nogueira / (Spain) T. Navarro	6	6
(Spain) J. Velasco / (Spain) N. Canovas	2	0
(France) A. Collombon / (Spain) J. Castelló	2	0
4	(Spain) Bea González / (Spain) L. Sainz	6	6
3	(Spain) Ariana / (Spain) P. Josemaria	6	6
(Spain) B. Caldera / (Spain) C. Goenaga	0	2
(Spain) A. Galán / M. Villalba	1	3
5	(Spain) Majo / (Spain) Mapi	6	6
7	(Spain) E. Amatriain / (Portugal) S. Araújo	4	2
(Argentina) D. Brea / (Spain) T. Icardo	6	6
(Argentina) A. Osoro / (Spain) V. Iglesias	6	7
2	(Spain) M. Marrero / (Spain) M. Ortega	2	6

Quarter-Final
1	(Spain) Gemma / (Spain) Salazar	6	7
6	(Spain) P. Llaguno / (Argentina) V. Riera	1	6
8	(Portugal) A.C. Nogueira / (Spain) T. Navarro
4	(Spain) Bea González / (Spain) L. Sainz	*
3	(Spain) Ariana / (Spain) P. Josemaria	7	6
5	(Spain) Majo / (Spain) Mapi	6	1
(Argentina) D. Brea / (Spain) T. Icardo	7	6
(Argentina) A. Osoro / (Spain) V. Iglesias	6	1

Semi-Finals
1	(Spain) Gemma / (Spain) Salazar	7	6	5
4	(Spain) Bea González / (Spain) L. Sainz	5	7	7
3	(Spain) Ariana / (Spain) P. Josemaria	6	6
(Argentina) D. Brea / (Spain) T. Icardo	2	4

Finals
4	(Spain) Bea González / (Spain) L. Sainz	3	4
3	(Spain) Ariana / (Spain) P. Josemaria	6	6

== Results ==
=== Round of 32 ===
Men's
Date	Winners	Score	Opponent	Ref.
7/4/2021	(Spain) Javi Garrido (Argentina) Juan Cruz Belluati	6–3 / 6–4	(Argentina) Denis Perino (Spain) Ernesto Moreno	
7/4/2021	(Spain) Álvaro Cepero (Spain) Juani Mieres	4–6 / 6–2 / 6–2	(Spain) Aday Santana (Argentina) Cristian Gutiérrez	
7/4/2021	(Spain) Alejandro Ruiz (Argentina) Franco Stupaczuk	3–6 / 6–3 / 6–1	(Spain) José Rico (Argentina) Ramiro Moyano	
7/4/2021	(Argentina) Federico Chingotto (Argentina) Juan Tello	7–6 / 6–1	(Spain) Nacho Gadea (Spain) Víctor Ruiz	
7/4/2021	(Spain) Coki Nieto (Spain) Juan Martín Díaz	6–3 / 6–3	(Argentina) Agustín Gutiérrez (Spain) Javier Martinez Vázquez	
7/4/2021	(Brazil) Lucas Bergamini (Brazil) Lucas Campagnolo	3–6 / 6–3 / 6–4	(Argentina) Lucho Capra (Spain) Pablo Lijó	
7/4/2021	(Spain) Arturo Coello (Argentina) Miguel Lamperti	6–4 / 6–2	(Spain) Javier Barahona (Spain) Martin Sánchez Piñeiro	
7/4/2021	(Spain) Iván Ramírez (Spain) Mike Yanguas	7–6 / 6–4	(Spain) Eduardo Alonso (Spain) Jesús Moya	
7/4/2021	(Argentina) Adrián Allemandi (Argentina) Maxi Sánchez	6–3 / 6–4	(Spain) Rafael Méndez (Spain) Salvador Oria	
7/4/2021	(Spain) Francisco Gil Morales (Spain) Sergio Alba	6–3 / 4–6 / 6–2	(Argentina) Agustin Gomez Silingo (Spain) Matías Díaz	
7/4/2021	(Spain) Anton Sans (Spain) Iñigo Zaratiegui	6–0 / 6–4	(Spain) José García Diestro (Spain) Pincho Fernández	
7/4/2021	(Spain) Javier Rico (Spain) Momo González	6–3 / 6–2	(Spain) Christian Fuster (Spain) Gonzalo Rubio	

Women's
Date	Winners	Score	Opponent	Ref.
7/4/2021	(Spain) Lucía Martínez (Spain) Verónica Virseda	7–5 / 6–1	(Spain) Barbara Las Heras (Spain) Carla Mesa	
7/4/2021	(Spain) Lorena Rufo (Spain) Marta Talavan	6–3 / 6–2	(Spain) Carla Tur Mari (Spain) Maria del Pilar Escandell	
7/4/2021	(Spain) Patricia Llaguno (Argentina) Virginia Riera	6–0 / 6–0	(Spain) Isabel Domínguez (Spain) Lorena Alonso	
7/4/2021	(Portugal) Ana Catarina Nogueira (Spain) Teresa Navarro	7–5 / 6–1	(Argentina) Claudia Jensen (Spain) Sandra Bellver	
7/4/2021	(Spain) Jimena Velasco (Spain) Noa Canovas	6–3 / 6–1	(Spain) Alicia Blanco Rojo (Spain) Melania Merino	
7/4/2021	(France) Alix Collombon (Spain) Jessica Castelló	6–4 / 5–7 / 6–2	(Argentina) Catalina Tenorio (Argentina) Julieta Bidahorria	
7/4/2021	(Spain) Beatriz Caldera (Spain) Carmen Goenaga	4–6 / 7–6 / 6–4	(Spain) Carolina Navarro (Argentina) Cecilia Reiter	
7/4/2021	(Spain) Alba Galán (Spain) Maria Villalba	7–5 / 6–3	(Spain) Esther Carnicero (Brazil) Raquel Piltcher	
7/4/2021	(Spain) Majo Sánchez (Spain) Mapi Sánchez	6–1 / 6–0	(Spain) Araceli Martínez (Spain) Sandra Hernández	
7/4/2021	(Spain) Elisabeth Amatriain (Portugal) Sofia Araújo	6–2 / 6–3	(Spain) Anna Cortiles (Spain) Ana Fernández de Ossó	
7/4/2021	(Argentina) Delfina Brea (Spain) Tamara Icardo	6–1 / 6–3	(Argentina) Nela Brito (Spain) Nicole Traviesa	
7/4/2021	(Argentina) Aranzazu Osoro (Spain) Victoria Iglesias	6–2 / 6–3	(Spain) Maite Gabarrús-Alonso (Spain) Nuria Rovira	

=== Round of 16 ===
Men's
Date	Winners	Score	Opponent	Ref.
8/4/2021	(Spain) Alejandro Galán (Spain) Juan Lebrón	7–6 / 7–6	(Spain) Javi Garrido (Argentina) Juan Cruz Belluati	
8/4/2021	(Spain) Alejandro Ruiz (Argentina) Franco Stupaczuk	6–3 / 7–5	(Spain) Álvaro Cepero (Spain) Juani Mieres	
8/4/2021	(Argentina) Federico Chingotto (Argentina) Juan Tello	6–2 / 6–2	(Spain) Coki Nieto (Spain) Juan Martín Díaz	
8/4/2021	(Argentina) Agustín Tapia (Brazil) Pablo Lima	7–5 / 6–1	(Brazil) Lucas Bergamini (Brazil) Lucas Campagnolo	
8/4/2021	(Spain) Arturo Coello (Argentina) Miguel Lamperti	6–4 / 3–6 / 7–6	(Argentina) Martin Di Nenno (Spain) Paquito Navarro	
8/4/2021	(Spain) Iván Ramírez (Spain) Mike Yanguas	6–3 / 6–4	(Argentina) Adrián Allemandi (Argentina) Maxi Sánchez	
8/4/2021	(Spain) Anton Sans (Spain) Iñigo Zaratiegui	7–6 / 6–1	(Spain) Francisco Gil Morales (Spain) Sergio Alba	
8/4/2021	(Argentina) Fernando Belasteguín (Argentina) Sanyo Gutiérrez	7–5 / 7–5	(Spain) Javier Rico (Spain) Momo González	

Women's
Date	Winners	Score	Opponent	Ref.
8/4/2021	(Spain) Alejandra Salazar (Spain) Gemma Triay	6–1 / 6–1	(Spain) Lucía Martínez (Spain) Verónica Virseda	
8/4/2021	(Spain) Patricia Llaguno (Argentina) Virginia Riera	7–5 / 6–7 / 6–2	(Spain) Lorena Rufo (Spain) Marta Talavan	
8/4/2021	(Portugal) Ana Catarina Nogueira (Spain) Teresa Navarro	6–2 / 6–0	(Spain) Jimena Velasco (Spain) Noa Canovas	
8/4/2021	(Spain) Bea González (Spain) Lucía Sainz	6–2 / 6–0	(France) Alix Collombon (Spain) Jessica Castelló	
8/4/2021	(Spain) Ariana Sánchez (Spain) Paula Josemaria	6–0 / 6–2	(Spain) Beatriz Caldera (Spain) Carmen Goenaga	
8/4/2021	(Spain) Majo Sánchez (Spain) Mapi Sánchez	6–1 / 6–3	(Spain) Alba Galán (Spain) Maria Villalba	
8/4/2021	(Argentina) Delfina Brea (Spain) Tamara Icardo	6–4 / 6–2	(Spain) Elisabeth Amatriain (Portugal) Sofia Araújo	
8/4/2021	(Argentina) Aranzazu Osoro (Spain) Victoria Iglesias	6–2 / 7–6	(Spain) Marta Marrero (Spain) Marta Ortega	

=== Quarter-Finals ===
Men's
Date	Winners	Score	Opponent	Ref.
9/4/2021	(Spain) Alejandro Ruiz (Argentina) Franco Stupaczuk	4–6 / 6–4 / 6–1	(Spain) Alejandro Galán (Spain) Juan Lebrón	
9/4/2021	(Argentina) Agustín Tapia (Brazil) Pablo Lima	7–5 / 6–7 / 6–2	(Argentina) Federico Chingotto (Argentina) Juan Tello	
9/4/2021	(Spain) Arturo Coello (Argentina) Miguel Lamperti	6–4 / 6–4	(Spain) Iván Ramírez (Spain) Mike Yanguas	
9/4/2021	(Argentina) Fernando Belasteguín (Argentina) Sanyo Gutiérrez	6–2 / 6–3	(Spain) Anton Sans (Spain) Iñigo Zaratiegui	

Women's
Date	Winners	Score	Opponent	Ref.
9/4/2021	(Spain) Alejandra Salazar (Spain) Gemma Triay	6–1 / 7–6	(Spain) Patricia Llaguno (Argentina) Virginia Riera	
9/4/2021	(Spain) Bea González (Spain) Lucía Sainz	W.O.	(Portugal) Ana Catarina Nogueira (Spain) Teresa Navarro	
9/4/2021	(Spain) Ariana Sánchez (Spain) Paula Josemaria	7–6 / 6–1	(Spain) Majo Sánchez (Spain) Mapi Sánchez	
9/4/2021	(Argentina) Delfina Brea (Spain) Tamara Icardo	7–6 / 6–1	(Argentina) Aranzazu Osoro (Spain) Victoria Iglesias	

=== Semi-Finals ===
Men's
Date	Winners	Score	Opponent	Ref.
10/4/2021	(Spain) Alejandro Ruiz (Argentina) Franco Stupaczuk	6–4 / 6–7 / 6–1	(Argentina) Agustín Tapia (Brazil) Pablo Lima	
10/4/2021	(Argentina) Fernando Belasteguín (Argentina) Sanyo Gutiérrez	7–5 / 7–6	(Spain) Arturo Coello (Argentina) Miguel Lamperti	

Women's
Date	Winners	Score	Opponent	Ref.
10/4/2021	(Spain) Bea González (Spain) Lucía Sainz	5–7 / 7–6 / 7–5	(Spain) Alejandra Salazar (Spain) Gemma Triay	
10/4/2021	(Spain) Ariana Sánchez (Spain) Paula Josemaria	6–2 / 6–4	(Argentina) Delfina Brea (Spain) Tamara Icardo	

=== Finals ===
Men's
Date	Winners	Score	Opponent	Ref.
11/4/2021	(Argentina) Fernando Belasteguín (Argentina) Sanyo Gutiérrez	6–7 / 6–4 / 6–3	(Spain) Alejandro Ruiz (Argentina) Franco Stupaczuk	

Women's
Date	Winners	Score	Opponent	Ref.
11/4/2021	(Spain) Ariana Sánchez (Spain) Paula Josemaria	6–3 / 6–4	(Spain) Bea González (Spain) Lucía Sainz	
