= 2025 supranational electoral calendar =

List of international elections held in 2025

The 2025 supranational electoral calendar lists elections, appointments, and leadership selection processes scheduled to be held in 2025 within international and transnational organizations. These include intergovernmental, supranational, and non-governmental bodies, such as international institutions, religious organizations, and sports organizations, whose governance structures extend beyond individual states. It does not include national elections or subnational electoral events within individual countries. Specific dates are given where these are known.

== February ==
- 15 February: African Union, Commission Chairperson

== March ==
- 10 March: Organization of American States, Secretary General
- 20 March: International Olympic Committee, President

== May ==
- 5 May: Organization of American States, Assistant Secretary General

== June ==
- 3 June: United Nations, Security Council

== September ==
- 21 September: Church of Sweden, Church Assembly

== Unknown date ==
- National Baseball Hall of Fame and Museum, Hall of Fame
