= Lescano =

Lescano is a surname. Notable people with the name include:

- Facundo Lescano (born 1996), Argentine footballer
- Juan Carlos Lescano (born 1991), Argentine footballer
- Juan Eduardo Lescano (born 1992), Argentine footballer
- Pablo Lescano (born 1977), Argentine musician
- Yonhy Lescano (born 1959), Peruvian lawyer and politician

== See also ==
- Lezcano
