= Madrid Destino =

Spanish public company

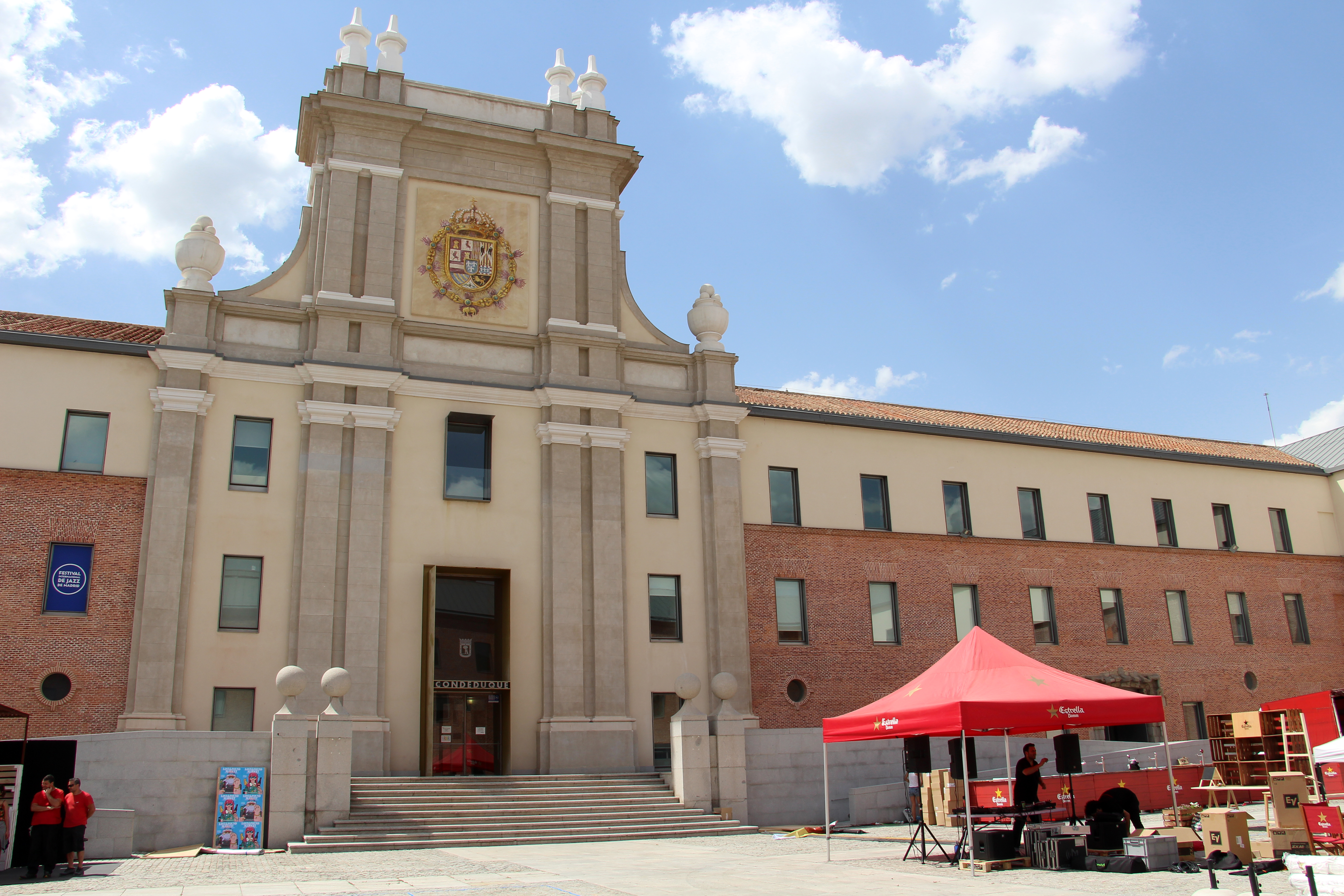
- Company type: sociedad anónima
- Headquarters: Calle del Conde Duque 9; 28015 Madrid
- Area served: Madrid
- Key people: Manuela Carmena Castrillo (Chairwoman); Antonio Fernández Segura (CEO)
- Owner: City Council of Madrid
- Number of employees: 583
- Website: www.madrid-destino.com/en

Madrid Destino Cultura, Turismo y Negocio, S.A, simply known as Madrid Destino, is a public company owned by the City Council of Madrid charged with the management of cultural aspects, tourism as well as venues and events.

It was created in June 2013, as result of the merging of Madrid Arte y Cultura S.A. (MACSA) and Madrid Visitors & Convention Bureau (MVCB). Later, it also inherited the assets of the municipal company Madrid Espacios y Congresos (MadridEC; effectively dissolved on 31 December 2013), such as Caja Mágica, the convention centres in La Castellana and Campo de las Naciones and the Madrid Arena.

Its headquarters are located at the Cuartel del Conde-Duque, in the Universidad neighborhood.
