= List of ambassadors of Belize to the United States =

Coordinates: 38°54′59.9″N 77°03′22.5″W

Ambassador of Belize to United States Embassy of Belize in Washington, D.C.
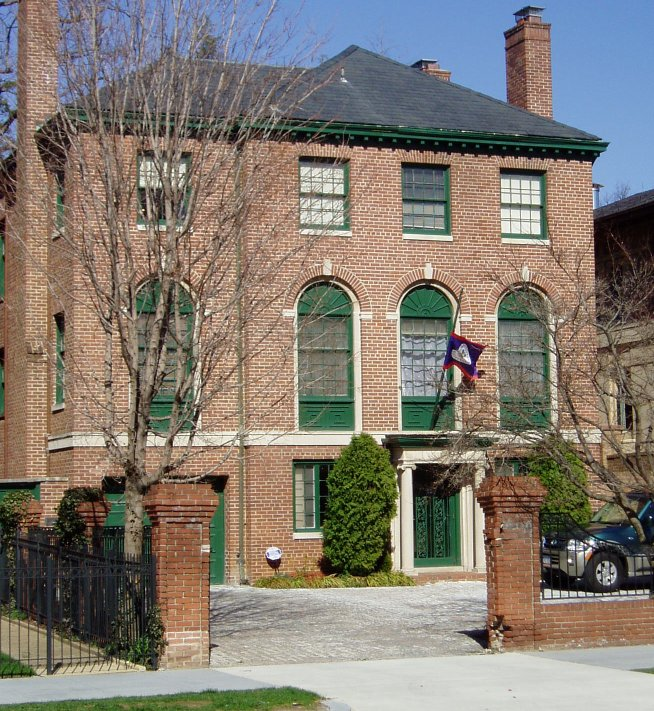
- Incumbent; Patrick Andrews since September 18, 2015
- Inaugural holder: Edmund Andrew Marshalleck
- Formation: April 12, 1982

The Belizean ambassador in Washington, D. C. is the official representative of the Government in Belmopan to the Government of the United States.

== List of representatives ==
Diplomatic agrément	Diplomatic accreditation	Ambassador	Observations	List of prime ministers of Belize	List of presidents of the United States	Term end
March 19, 1982	April 12, 1982	Edmund Andrew Marshalleck	NON-RESIDENT: Dip. in Public Administration (1965), B.Sc. (Econ.) 1970, public servant, A/g Financial Secretary, Ministry of Finance, Chairman, Income Tax Appeal Board, Chairman, Monetary Authority, Alternate Director, Caribbean Development Bank, Born Benque Viejo, Cayo, Belize, Dec. 12, 1932, son of Upton Daniel Marshalleck and Lucy née Wade. Educated in Belize, U.W.I., Jamaica. Speaks Spanish. Married Nov. 19, 1966, Felicia Maria née Escalante, 2 sons (Martin Gregory, Edmund Andrew), 1 dau. (Julie Ann). Career: Administrative Officer, Sr. Economist, Undersecretary Finance, Religion: Roman Catholic, Recreation: sports,	George Cadle Price	Ronald Reagan	
November 15, 1983	November 21, 1983	Henry Edney Conrad Cain	O.B.E. (1975), F.C.C.A. (1977), certified accountant, Managing director, The Monetary Authority of Belize, Member, Income Tax Appeal Board. Born Belize City, December 2, 1924, son of late Henry Edney Conrad Cain and Rhoda Cain (née Stamp). Educated Ebenezer Primary, St. George's College, St. Michael's College, Bal- ham and Tooting College of Commerce, London, A.A.C.C.A. (1961). Married July 1951, Leonie Elfreda née Locke. Career: joined Government Service, 1940, Audit Department, 1946, Examiner of Accounts, 1954–55, Sr. Examiner of Accounts, 1955–59, Auditor 1959- 61, acted as Principal Auditor (Auditor General) 1956 and 1959, Assistant Accountant General, Attorney General's Department, 1961–63, Accountant General, 1963-77 (retired), Managing Director, The Monetary Authority of Belize, 1977-. Awarded M.B.E. (1965). Religion: Methodist (Dist: Treas, Blize/Honduras Dist. of the Methodist Church). Affiliations:	George Cadle Price	Ronald Reagan	
July 24, 1985	September 17, 1985	Edward Arthur Laing	Educator, ambassador, attorney. (* Feb 27, 1942), son of Marjorie Laing and Edward Laing, married Margery V Fairweather, Apr 5, 1969, children: Obi Uchenna, Nyasha Rufaro.; 1964 BA Cambridge.; 1966 LLB Cambridge.; 1968 LLM Columbia.; 1966 Barrister at Law; 1969, Atty at Law IL .; 1966-67: Belize, magistrate & crown counsel.; 1968-69Baker & McKenzie, assoc.; 1970-74Univ of West Indies, Barbados & Jamaica, sr lecturer.; From 1974 to 1976 he was, asst prof at the Notre Dame Law School.; 1976-81 he was associate law prof at the Univ of Maryland.; 1980-85: Howard Univ School of Law, professor/director of graduate program, .,	Manuel Esquivel	Ronald Reagan	
July 11, 1990	August 7, 1990	James Vallencourt Hyde	(* Sept, 29, 1933) Land surveyor, bus. exec.: 1977 Commr. of Lands and Survey Dept.; 1980-85 Permanent Secretary of the Ministry of Natural Resources.	George Cadle Price	George H. W. Bush	
September 20, 1993	October 1, 1993	Dean Lindo		Manuel Esquivel	Bill Clinton	
September 19, 1996	October 9, 1996	James Schoffield Murphy		Manuel Esquivel	Bill Clinton	
October 27, 2000	December 7, 2000	Lisa Shoman		Said Wilbert Musa	Bill Clinton	
July 28, 2008		Nestor Mendez		Dean Oliver Barrow	George W. Bush	
	September 18, 2015	Patrick Andrews		Dean Oliver Barrow	Barack Obama	

- Belize–United States relations
