= 2019 WPT Madrid Master =

World Padel Tour tournament held in Madrid, Spain

- Date: 3 – 8 September
- Edition: 15th (Note: The first twelve editions were held under the organization of the Padel Pro Tour, with this being the first edition as a Master.)
- Category: Master
- Location: Madrid, Spain
- Venue: Madrid Arena

Champions
- Men's doubles: (Argentina) Agustín Tapia (Argentina) Fernando Belasteguín
- Women's doubles: (Portugal) Ana Catarina Nogueira (Spain) Paula Josemaría

Chronology

The 2019 Madrid Master (officially 2019 World Padel Tour Estrella Damm Madrid Master) was the eleventh tournament of the seventh season organized by World Padel Tour, the most prestigious padel circuit at the time.

In the women’s category, for the second consecutive tournament Ana Catarina Nogueira and Paula Josemaria reached the finals (their third of the season), where they faced Elisabeth Amatriain and Patricia Llaguno, marking the first time this season that no pair from the top 4 of the FIP rankings reached the final. In the championship match, Nogueira and Josemaria defeated Amatriain and Llaguno, securing the first title of both their careers and marking the first time a Portuguese player has won a title at the highest level of professional padel.

In the men’s category, for the first time this season, a pair ranked outside the top 8 reached the final, with Agustín Tapia and Fernando Belasteguín, eliminating the 2nd-seeded pair (Lebrón-Paquito), the 5th seeds (Díaz-Stupaczuk), and the 6th seeds (Botello-Ruíz) on their way to the last round. Their opponents were the world number 1s, Maxi Sánchez and Sanyo Gutiérrez, who were returning to a final after a five-tournament absence from the championship match. In the final, Belasteguín and Tapia defeated Maxi and Sanyo in straight sets, securing their first title as a pair, and the first of Tapia’s career. For Belasteguín, it marked his eleventh title in Madrid (having previously won in 2006-I, 2006-II, 2007-I, 2007-II, 2008, 2010-II, 2011-I, 2011-II, 2012-I, and 2012-II).

== Relevant Data ==
=== Alejandra Salazar and Paquito Navarro miss the chance to reach the top of the world rankings in Madrid ===
Paquito Navarro, who entered the tournament placed third in the world rankings, had his first mathematical opportunity of the year at the Madrid Master to reach the number one spot. A victory alongside his partner, Juan Lebrón, would have propelled him to the top, making him the first Spaniard to lead the rankings and joining an elite group of players who have held the top spot this century: Juan Martín Díaz, Fernando Belasteguín, Pablo Lima, Maxi Sánchez, and Sanyo Gutiérrez. Before the tournament began, Maxi and Sanyo held 11,810 points compared to Paquito’s 11,185. Furthermore, Maxi and Sanyo were defending 1,000 points, while Paquito was defending only 180.

On the women’s circuit, Alejandra Salazar also had the chance to overtake Marta Marrero and become the sole leader of the ranking, a feat that did not materialize, as she did not win the tournament.

== Head-to-head record between teams ranked in the top 4 during the season ==
=== Men's ===
Record	Maxi–Sanyo	Lebrón–Paquito	Galán–Lima	Lamperti–Mieres	Former Pairs	Díaz–Stupaczuk	Belasteguín–Lima	Galán–J. Mieres
Maxi–Sanyo	—	3–1	—	—		2–0	—	1–1
Lebrón–Paquito	1–3	—	0–2	—		2–1	5–0	2–0
Galán–Lima	—	2–0	—	—		—	—	—
Lamperti–Mieres	—	—	—	—		—	—	—
Former Pairs
Díaz–Stupaczuk	0–2	1–2	—	—		—	0–1	2–0
Belasteguín–Lima	—	0–5	—	—		1–0	—	0–1
Galán–J. Mieres	1–1	0–2	—	—		0–2	1–0	—

=== Women's ===
Record	Marrero–Ortega	Ariana–Salazar	Triay–Sainz	Majo–Mapi	Former Pairs	Delfina–Majo
Marrero–Ortega	—	3–2	3–0	—		2–0
Ariana–Salazar	2–3	—	3–0	—		4–0
Triay–Sainz	0–3	0–3	—	—		—
Majo–Mapi	—	—	—	—		—
Former Pairs
Delfina–Majo	0–2	0–4	—	—		—

== Draws ==
=== Men's Bracket ===
Round of 32
1	(Argentina) Maxi / (Argentina) Sanyo	6	6
(Spain) Á. Cepero / (Spain) P. Lijó	4	2
Q	(Spain) I. Ramírez / (Spain) M. Yanguas	2	2
(Brazil) L. Bergamini / (Brazil) L. Campagnolo	6	6
(Spain) A. Ruiz / (Spain) M. Piñeiro	6	6
Q	(Spain) A. Sans/ (Spain) M. Del Castillo	4	2
(Argentina) Di Nenno / (Spain) J. Garrido	4	4
7	(Argentina) A. Allemandi / (Argentina) A. Silingo	6	6
8	(Argentina) C. Gutiérrez / (Argentina) L. Capra	6	6
Q	(Argentina) A. Patiniotis / (Argentina) Godo Díaz	2	4
(Spain) N. Gadea / (Argentina) S. Nerone	3	7	6
(Argentina) J.C. Belluati / (Argentina) R. Moyano	6	5	7
(Uruguay) D. Ramos / (Spain) R. Méndez	7	2	6
(Spain) J. Rico / (Spain) V. Ruiz	6	6	6
(Spain) Coki / (Spain) J. Rico	7	6
4	(Spain) J. Mieres / (Argentina) M. Lamperti	5	2
3	(Spain) Galán / (Brazil) Lima	6	6
(Argentina) J. Restivo / (Spain) M. Solbes	0	3
(Spain) A. Blanco / (Spain) J. Martinez	6	4	0
(Spain) G. Rubio / (Spain) E. Moreno	3	6	6
(Spain) A. Santana / (Argentina) M. Grabiel	2	4
Q	(Spain) C. Fuster / (Portugal) M. Oliveira	6	6
(Argentina) G. Tamame / J. Muñoz	4	4
6	(Spain) J. Ruiz / (Spain) U. Botello	6	6
5	(Argentina) F. Stupaczuk / (Spain) M. Díaz	6	6
(Argentina) F. Chingotto / (Argentina) J. Tello	2	4
(Argentina) F. Poggi / (Spain) P.A. Martínez	6	1	4
(Argentina) F. Quiles / (Brazil) F. Gomes	4	6	6
(Argentina) Belasteguín / (Argentina) Tapia	7	6
(Spain) J. Barahona / (Spain) J. Gutiérrez	5	3
(Spain) J.G. Diestro / (Spain) P. Fernandéz	1	2
2	(Spain) Lebrón / (Spain) Paquito	6	6

Round of 16
1	(Argentina) Maxi / (Argentina) Sanyo	6	6
(Brazil) L. Bergamini / (Brazil) L. Campagnolo	3	1
(Spain) A. Ruiz / (Spain) M. Piñeiro	4	2
7	(Argentina) A. Allemandi / (Argentina) A. Silingo	6	6
8	(Argentina) C. Gutiérrez / (Argentina) L. Capra	1	3
(Argentina) J.C. Belluati / (Argentina) R. Moyano	6	6
(Spain) J. Rico / (Spain) V. Ruiz	6	6	6
(Spain) Coki / (Spain) J. Rico	4	7	1
3	(Spain) Galán / (Brazil) Lima	6	7
(Spain) G. Rubio / (Spain) E. Moreno	3	6
(Spain) C. Fuster / (Portugal) M. Oliveira	3	6
6	(Spain) J. Ruiz / (Spain) U. Botello	6	7
5	(Argentina) F. Stupaczuk / (Spain) M. Díaz	6	6
(Argentina) F. Quiles / (Brazil) F. Gomes	3	3
(Argentina) Belasteguín / (Argentina) Tapia	6	6
2	(Spain) Lebrón / (Spain) Paquito	4	4

Quarter-Final
1	(Argentina) Maxi / (Argentina) Sanyo	6	6
7	(Argentina) A. Allemandi / (Argentina) A. Silingo	2	2
(Argentina) J.C. Belluati / (Argentina) R. Moyano	6	6
(Spain) J. Rico / (Spain) V. Ruiz	2	4
3	(Spain) Galán / (Brazil) Lima	4	4
6	(Spain) J. Ruiz / (Spain) U. Botello	6	6
5	(Argentina) F. Stupaczuk / (Spain) M. Díaz	3	2
(Argentina) Belasteguín / (Argentina) Tapia	6	6

Semi-Finals
1	(Argentina) Maxi / (Argentina) Sanyo	7	5	*
(Argentina) J.C. Belluati / (Argentina) R. Moyano	6	1
6	(Spain) J. Ruiz / (Spain) U. Botello	6	0
(Argentina) Belasteguín / (Argentina) Tapia	7	6

Finals
1	(Argentina) Maxi / (Argentina) Sanyo	4	4
(Argentina) Belasteguín / (Argentina) Tapia	6	6

=== Women's Bracket ===
Round of 32
1	(Spain) M. Marrero / (Spain) M. Ortega
Bye
(Spain) L. Alonso / (Spain) S. Pujals	7	4	4
(Spain) A. Blanco / (Spain) B. Caldera	5	6	6
(Spain) C. Navarro / (Argentina) C. Reiter	6	6
(Argentina) A. Osoro / (Argentina) N. Brito	3	4
(Spain) M. Villalba / (Spain) V. Virseda	6	4	6
(Spain) A. Galán / (Spain) V. Iglesias	1	6	1
(Spain) E. Amatriain / (Spain) P. Llaguno	6	6
Q	(Spain) A. Cañellas / (Spain) C. Carrascosa	2	0
(Spain) E. Ramírez / (Spain) M. Talavan	6	6
(Spain) C. Goenaga / (Spain) N. Rodríguez	4	2
(France) A. Collombon / (Spain) N. Traviesa	6	2	6
(Spain) C. Mesa / (Brazil) R. Piltcher	4	6	1
Bye
4	(Spain) Majo / (Spain) Mapi
3	(Spain) Gemma / (Spain) L. Sainz
Bye
Q	(Belgium) H. Wyckaert / (Spain) S. Bellver	2	5
(Uruguay) A. De los Santos / (Uruguay) M. Drosdov	6	7
(Spain) L. Martínez / (Spain) T. Navarro	6	6
(Spain) A.F. de Ossó / (Spain) S. Ruiz	4	3
(Spain) E. Carnicero / (Spain) M. Merino	1	1
(Portugal) A.C. Nogueira / (Spain) P. Josemaría	6	6
(Spain) B. González / (Argentina) D. Brea	6	6
Q	(Spain) A. Izquierdo / (Spain) A. Rico	0	2
(Portugal) S. Araújo / (Argentina) V. Riera	6	6
(Spain) S. Hernández / (Spain) T. Icardo	7	7
(Spain) A. Martinez / (Argentina) C. Tenorio	6	6
(Spain) A. Tapia / (Spain) J. Castelló	1	2
Bye
2	(Spain) Ariana / (Spain) Salazar

Round of 16
1	(Spain) M. Marrero / (Spain) M. Ortega	6	6
(Spain) A. Blanco / (Spain) B. Caldera	1	4
(Spain) C. Navarro / (Argentina) C. Reiter	6	1
(Spain) M. Villalba / (Spain) V. Virseda	7	6
(Spain) E. Amatriain / (Spain) P. Llaguno	6	6
(Spain) E. Ramírez / (Spain) M. Talavan	3	0
(France) A. Collombon / (Spain) N. Traviesa	1	4
4	(Spain) Majo / (Spain) Mapi	6	6
3	(Spain) Gemma / (Spain) L. Sainz	6	6
(Uruguay) A. De los Santos / (Uruguay) M. Drosdov	0	1
(Spain) L. Martínez / (Spain) T. Navarro	4	3
(Portugal) A.C. Nogueira / (Spain) P. Josemaría	6	6
(Spain) B. González / (Argentina) D. Brea	6	6
(Spain) S. Hernández / (Spain) T. Icardo	1	3
(Spain) A. Martinez / (Argentina) C. Tenorio	2	4
2	(Spain) Ariana / (Spain) Salazar	6	6

Quarter-Final
1	(Spain) M. Marrero / (Spain) M. Ortega	6	6
(Spain) M. Villalba / (Spain) V. Virseda	0	2
(Spain) E. Amatriain / (Spain) P. Llaguno	6	7	6
4	(Spain) Majo / (Spain) Mapi	7	6	2
3	(Spain) Gemma / (Spain) L. Sainz	3	6	6
(Portugal) A.C. Nogueira / (Spain) P. Josemaría	6	3	7
(Spain) B. González / (Argentina) D. Brea	6	4
2	(Spain) Ariana / (Spain) Salazar	7	6

Semi-Finals
1	(Spain) M. Marrero / (Spain) M. Ortega	6	3	4
(Spain) E. Amatriain / (Spain) P. Llaguno	4	6	6
(Portugal) A.C. Nogueira / (Spain) P. Josemaría	1	7	7
2	(Spain) Ariana / (Spain) Salazar	6	6	6

Finals
(Spain) E. Amatriain / (Spain) P. Llaguno	4	3
(Portugal) A.C. Nogueira / (Spain) P. Josemaría	6	6

== Results ==
=== Round of 32 ===
Men's
Date	Winners	Score	Opponent	Ref.
6/9/2019	(Argentina) Maxi Sánchez (Argentina) Sanyo Gutiérrez	6–4 / 6–2	(Spain) Álvaro Cepero (Spain) Pablo Lijó	
6/9/2019	(Brazil) Lucas Bergamini (Brazil) Lucas Campagnolo	6–2 / 6–2	(Spain) Iván Ramírez (Spain) Mike Yanguas	
6/9/2019	(Spain) Alejandro Ruiz (Spain) Martin Sánchez Piñeiro	6–4 / 6–2	(Spain) Anton Sans (Spain) Mario Del Castillo	
6/9/2019	(Argentina) Agustin Goméz Silingo (Argentina) Adrián Allemandi	6–4 / 6–4	(Spain) Javi Garrido (Argentina) Martín Di Nenno	
6/9/2019	(Argentina) Cristian Gutiérrez (Argentina) Lucho Capra	6–2 / 6–4	(Argentina) Aris Patiniotis (Argentina) Godo Díaz	
6/9/2019	(Argentina) Juan Cruz Belluati (Argentina) Ramiro Moyano	6–3 / 5–7 / 7–6	(Spain) Nacho Gadea (Argentina) Sebastián Nerone	
6/9/2019	(Spain) José Rico (Spain) Víctor Ruiz	6–7 / 6–2 / 7–6	(Uruguay) Diego Ramos (Spain) Rafael Méndez	
6/9/2019	(Spain) Coki Nieto (Spain) Javi Rico	7–5 / 6–2	(Spain) Juani Mieres (Argentina) Miguel Lamperti	
6/9/2019	(Spain) Alejandro Galán (Brazil) Pablo Lima	6–0 / 6–3	(Argentina) Juan Manuel Restivo (Spain) Miguel Solbes	
6/9/2019	(Spain) Gonzalo Rubio (Spain) Ernesto Moreno	3–6 / 6–4 / 6–0	(Spain) Adrián Blanco (Spain) Javier Martinez Vazquez	
6/9/2019	(Spain) Christian Fuster (Portugal) Miguel Oliveira	6–2 / 6–4	(Spain) Aday Santana (Argentina) Maxi Grabiel	
6/9/2019	(Spain) Javi Ruiz (Spain) Uri Botello	6–4 / 6–4	(Argentina) Germán Tamame (Spain) Jordi Muñoz	
6/9/2019	(Argentina) Franco Stupaczuk (Spain) Matías Díaz	6–2 / 6–4	(Argentina) Federico Chingotto (Argentina) Juan Tello	
6/9/2019	(Argentina) Federico Quiles (Brazil) Francisco Gomes	4–6 / 6–1 / 6–4	(Argentina) Fernando Poggi (Spain) Pedro Alonso Martínez	
6/9/2019	(Argentina) Agustín Tapia (Argentina) Fernando Belasteguín	7–5 / 6–3	(Spain) Javier Barahona (Spain) Jorge Ruiz Gutiérrez	
6/9/2019	(Spain) Juan Lebrón (Spain) Paquito Navarro	6–1 / 6–2	(Spain) José García Diestro (Spain) Pincho Fernández	

Women's
Date	Winners	Score	Opponent	Ref.
6/9/2019	(Spain) Alicia Blanco Rojo (Spain) Beatriz Caldera	5–7 / 6–4 / 6–4	(Spain) Angela Caro Cantin (Spain) Sara Pujals	
6/9/2019	(Spain) Carolina Navarro (Argentina) Cecilia Reiter	6–3 / 6–4	(Argentina) Aranzazu Osoro (Argentina) Nela Brito	
6/9/2019	(Spain) Maria Villalba (Spain) Verónica Virseda	6–1 / 4–6 / 6–1	(Spain) Alba Galán (Spain) Victoria Iglesias	
6/9/2019	(Spain) Elisabeth Amatriain (Spain) Patricia Llaguno	6–2 / 6–0	(Spain) Ariadna Cañellas (Spain) Cristina Carrascosa	
6/9/2019	(Spain) Elena Ramírez (Spain) Marta Talavan	6–4 / 6–2	(Spain) Carmen Goenaga (Spain) Nuria Rodríguez	
6/9/2019	(France) Alix Collombon (Spain) Nicole Traviesa Mola	6–4 / 2–6 / 6–1	(Spain) Nuria Rovira (Brazil) Raquel Piltcher	
6/9/2019	(Uruguay) Andreína De los Santos (Uruguay) Manuela Alaga Drosdov	6–2 / 7–5	(Belgium) Helena Wyckaert (Spain) Sandra Bellver	
6/9/2019	(Spain) Lucía Martínez (Spain) Teresa Navarro	6–4 / 6–3	(Spain) Ana Fernández de Ossó (Spain) Sara Ruiz	
6/9/2019	(Portugal) Ana Catarina Nogueira (Spain) Paula Josemaría	6–1 / 6–1	(Spain) Esther Carnicero (Spain) Melania Merino	
6/9/2019	(Spain) Bea González (Argentina) Delfina Brea	6–0 / 6–2	(Spain) Ainhoa Rico Martin (Spain) Alba Izquierdo	
6/9/2019	(Spain) Sandra Hernández (Spain) Tamara Icardo	7–6 / 7–6	(Portugal) Sofia Araújo (Argentina) Virginia Riera	
6/9/2019	(Spain) Araceli Martinez (Argentina) Catalina Tenorio	6–1 / 6–2	(Spain) Anna Cortiles Tapia (Spain) Jessica Castelló	

=== Round of 16 ===
Men's
Date	Winners	Score	Opponent	Ref.
7/9/2019	(Argentina) Maxi Sánchez (Argentina) Sanyo Gutiérrez	6–3 / 6–1	(Brazil) Lucas Bergamini (Brazil) Lucas Campagnolo	
7/9/2019	(Argentina) Agustin Goméz Silingo (Argentina) Adrián Allemandi	6–4 / 6–2	(Spain) Alejandro Ruiz (Spain) Martin Sánchez Piñeiro	
7/9/2019	(Argentina) Juan Cruz Belluati (Argentina) Ramiro Moyano	6–1 / 6–3	(Argentina) Cristian Gutiérrez (Argentina) Lucho Capra	
7/9/2019	(Spain) José Rico (Spain) Víctor Ruiz	6–4 / 6–7 / 6–1	(Spain) Coki Nieto (Spain) Javi Rico	
7/9/2019	(Spain) Alejandro Galán (Brazil) Pablo Lima	6–3 / 7–6	(Spain) Gonzalo Rubio (Spain) Ernesto Moreno	
7/9/2019	(Spain) Javi Ruiz (Spain) Uri Botello	6–3 / 7–6	(Spain) Christian Fuster (Portugal) Miguel Oliveira	
7/9/2019	(Argentina) Franco Stupaczuk (Spain) Matías Díaz	6–3 / 6–3	(Argentina) Federico Quiles (Brazil) Francisco Gomes	
7/9/2019	(Argentina) Agustín Tapia (Argentina) Fernando Belasteguín	6–4 / 6–4	(Spain) Juan Lebrón (Spain) Paquito Navarro	

Women's
Date	Winners	Score	Opponent	Ref.
7/9/2019	(Spain) Marta Marrero (Spain) Marta Ortega	6–1 / 6–4	(Spain) Alicia Blanco Rojo (Spain) Beatriz Caldera	
7/9/2019	(Spain) Maria Villalba (Spain) Verónica Virseda	7–6 / 6–1	(Spain) Carolina Navarro (Argentina) Cecilia Reiter	
7/9/2019	(Spain) Elisabeth Amatriain (Spain) Patricia Llaguno	6–3 / 6–0	(Spain) Elena Ramírez (Spain) Marta Talavan	
7/9/2019	(Spain) Majo Sánchez (Spain) Mapi Sánchez	6–1 / 6–4	(France) Alix Collombon (Spain) Nicole Traviesa Mola	
7/9/2019	(Spain) Gemma Triay (Spain) Lucia Sainz	6–0 / 6–1	(Uruguay) Andreína De los Santos (Uruguay) Manuela Alaga Drosdov	
7/9/2019	(Portugal) Ana Catarina Nogueira (Spain) Paula Josemaría	6–4 / 6–3	(Spain) Lucía Martínez (Spain) Teresa Navarro	
7/9/2019	(Spain) Bea González (Argentina) Delfina Brea	6–1 / 6–3	(Spain) Sandra Hernández (Spain) Tamara Icardo	
7/9/2019	(Spain) Alejandra Salazar (Spain) Ariana Sánchez	6–2 / 6–4	(Spain) Araceli Martinez (Argentina) Catalina Tenorio	

=== Quarter-Finals ===
Men's
Date	Winners	Score	Opponent	Ref.
6/9/2019	(Argentina) Maxi Sánchez (Argentina) Sanyo Gutiérrez	6–2 / 6–2	(Argentina) Agustin Goméz Silingo (Argentina) Adrián Allemandi	
6/9/2019	(Argentina) Juan Cruz Belluati (Argentina) Ramiro Moyano	6–2 / 6–4	(Spain) José Rico (Spain) Víctor Ruiz	
6/9/2019	(Spain) Javi Ruiz (Spain) Uri Botello	6–4 / 6–4	(Spain) Alejandro Galán (Brazil) Pablo Lima	
6/9/2019	(Argentina) Agustín Tapia (Argentina) Fernando Belasteguín	6–3 / 6–2	(Argentina) Franco Stupaczuk (Spain) Matías Díaz	

Women's
Date	Winners	Score	Opponent	Ref.
6/9/2019	(Spain) Marta Marrero (Spain) Marta Ortega	6–0 / 6–2	(Spain) Maria Villalba (Spain) Verónica Virseda	
6/9/2019	(Spain) Elisabeth Amatriain (Spain) Patricia Llaguno	6–7 / 7–6 / 6–2	(Spain) Majo Sánchez (Spain) Mapi Sánchez	
6/9/2019	(Portugal) Ana Catarina Nogueira (Spain) Paula Josemaría	6–3 / 3–6 / 7–6	(Spain) Gemma Triay (Spain) Lucia Sainz	
6/9/2019	(Spain) Alejandra Salazar (Spain) Ariana Sánchez	7–6 / 6–4	(Spain) Bea González (Argentina) Delfina Brea	

=== Semi-Finals ===
Men's
Date	Winners	Score	Opponent	Ref.
7/9/2019	(Argentina) Maxi Sánchez (Argentina) Sanyo Gutiérrez	7–6 / 5–1 / W.O.	(Argentina) Juan Cruz Belluati (Argentina) Ramiro Moyano	
7/9/2019	(Argentina) Agustín Tapia (Argentina) Fernando Belasteguín	7–6 / 6–0	(Spain) Javi Ruiz (Spain) Uri Botello	

Women's
Date	Winners	Score	Opponent	Ref.
7/9/2019	(Spain) Elisabeth Amatriain (Spain) Patricia Llaguno	4–6 / 6–3 / 6–4	(Spain) Marta Marrero (Spain) Marta Ortega	
7/9/2019	(Portugal) Ana Catarina Nogueira (Spain) Paula Josemaría	1–6 / 7–6 / 7–6	(Spain) Alejandra Salazar (Spain) Ariana Sánchez	

=== Finals ===
Men's
Date	Winners	Score	Opponent	Ref.
8/9/2019	(Argentina) Agustín Tapia (Argentina) Fernando Belasteguín	6–4 / 6–4	(Argentina) Maxi Sánchez (Argentina) Sanyo Gutiérrez	

Women's
Date	Winners	Score	Opponent	Ref.
8/9/2019	(Portugal) Ana Catarina Nogueira (Spain) Paula Josemaría	6–4 / 6–3	(Spain) Elisabeth Amatriain (Spain) Patricia Llaguno	
