= Saúl Cepeda Lezcano =

Spanish writer, gourmand and journalist

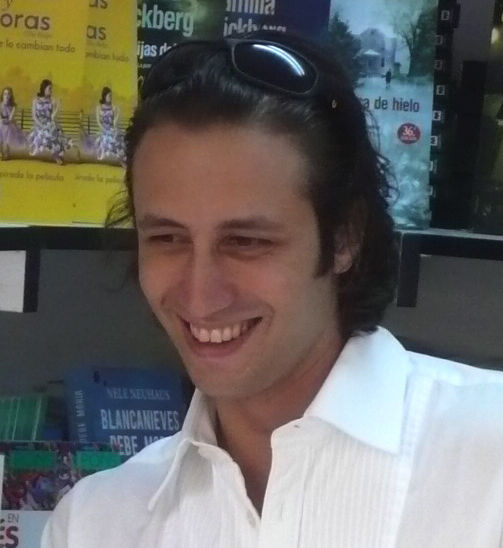
- Lezcano signing books at Madrid in 2012.
- Born: Saul Cepeda Lezcano; 6 November 1976 (age 49); Irun, Guipuzkoa, Spain
- Education: Complutense University of Madrid; Political Science
- Occupations: Writer, journalist
- Writing career
- Pen name: Saul
- Period: 1997–present
- Genres: Short story, novel, existentialism
- Website: saulweb.com

Saúl Cepeda Lezcano (born Irún, 1976) is a Spanish writer, jurist, gourmand and journalist.

== Biography ==
Saúl Cepeda Lezcano has degrees in Political Science and Law. He was involved in student associations for the defense of intellectual property at the University. He has worked as a creative director, nightclub manager and environmental activist. In 2006 he invented a new system of representation of time. Currently he writes about food, travel and social issues in several media such as on Madrid (El País), Sobremesa and Rolling Stone, having covered almost a hundred countries, including conflict areas like the Balkans.

== Literary work ==
In 1998 he was the youngest finalist in the history of the Antonio Machado Short Story Award, granted by the Spanish Railways Foundation and under the chairmanship of the jury of Camilo José Cela. In 2003 he won the XI Food and Travel award of El Chiscón. In 2012 he published the short stories book Delitos para llevar, signing as Saul. In the same year he was awarded with the XVI José María de Pereda Prize for his novel Previsto. In April 2015 was published his novel Aforo Completo (Full House), inspired by his high-level experience in nightlife business, where he worked for the main accused at the trial by the tragedy of Madrid Arena. In 2017 he was awarded with the XIII Eurostars Hotels Travel Narrative Award for his work Cuentakilómetros. In 2018, he received the Ciudad de Getafe Crime Novel Prize. In 2021, he received the XXXVII Benito Pérez Armas Prize.

== Essay ==
Cepeda is coauthor of the book Pulses: Nutritious seeds for a sustainable future published by the Food and Agriculture Organization of the United Nations to support the International Year of Pulses declared by the United Nations General Assembly. The text is published in the six FAO official languages and distributed in 194 countries.
