= Madrid Arena =

Tennis venue in Madrid, Spain

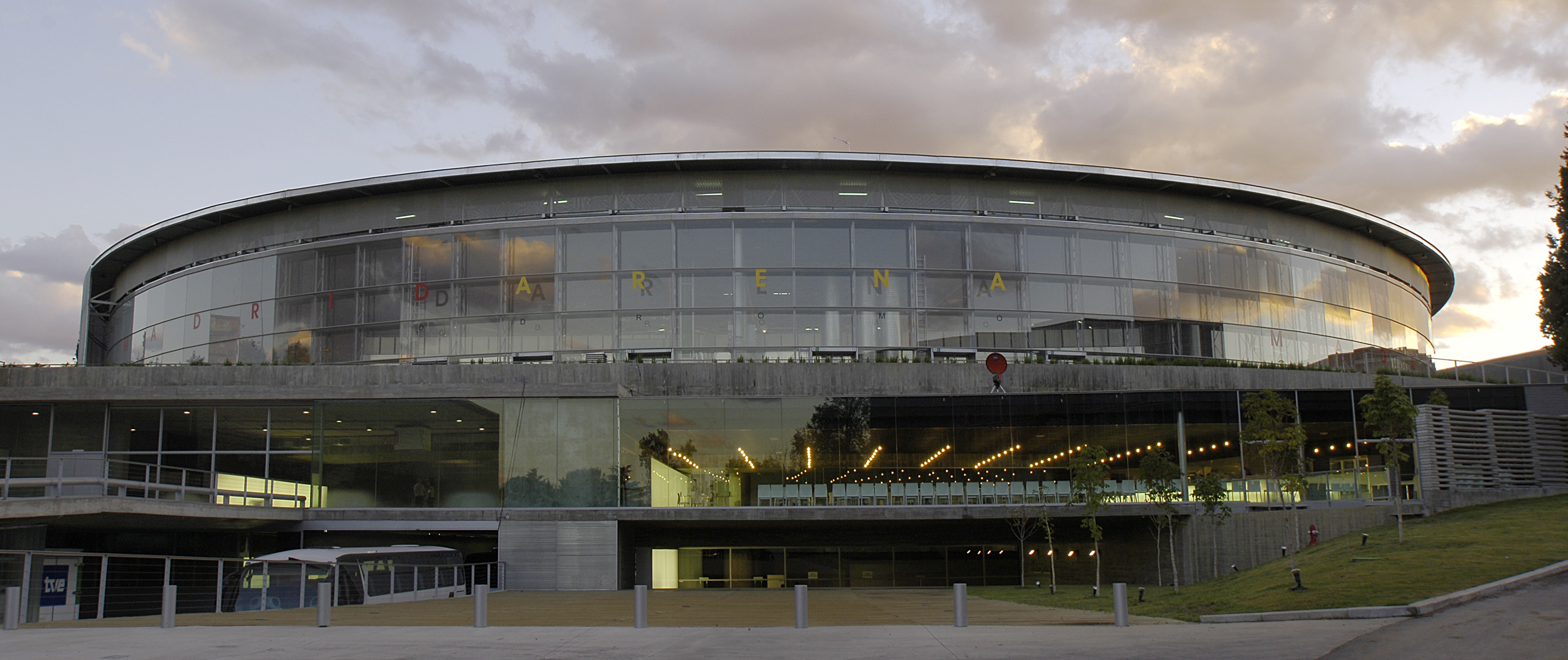
- Interactive map of Madrid Arena
- Former names: Telefónica Arena
- Location: Madrid, Spain
- Coordinates: 40°24′46.97″N 3°44′17.72″W
- Owner: City Council of Madrid
- Capacity: 12,000 (seating capacity); 10,500 (basketball, tennis)

Construction
- Built: February 2002
- Opened: July 2002
- Cost: €57 million
- Architect: Estudio Cano Lasso
- Structural engineer: Julio Martínez Calzón

Tenants
- CB Estudiantes (Basketball) (2005–2010); Madrid Masters (Masters 1000) (2002–2008); WTA Tour Championships (Tennis) (2006, 2007)

Madrid Arena is an indoor arena located in the city of Madrid, in the fairgrounds in the Casa de Campo, just minutes from the city centre. Built from the old Rocódromo, the pavilion was designed by Spanish architects Estudio Cano Lasso who designed this versatile building in 2001 to host sporting events, commercial, cultural and leisure activities. The pavilion was sponsored by the company Telefónica for what was also known as Telefónica Arena.

== Construction ==
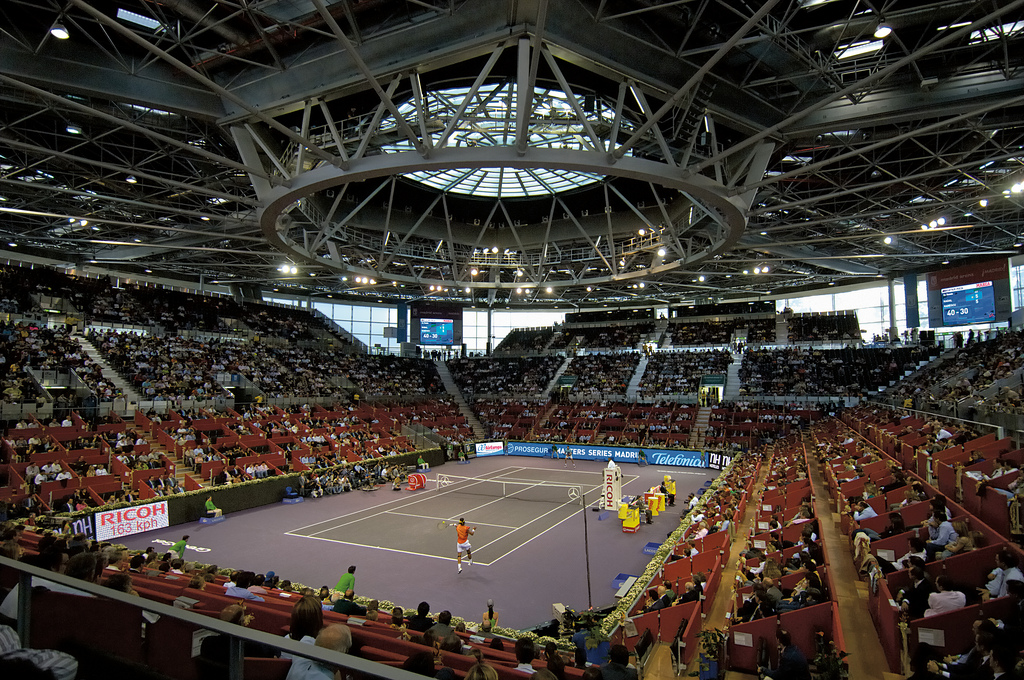
The arena during the Madrid Open in October 2005

The arena was built in 2002 as part of the facilities planned for the Madrid 2012 Olympic bid. It was expected to house basketball competitions. The first phase was about in 2002, expanded the following year.

It is distributed on three floors (access, intermediate and low). Its central court has three retractable bleachers, allowing the surface to change depending on the type of event.

The pavilion features a Satellite Pavilion, with an area of 2,100 m^{2} and it was the location of the Mutua Madrileña Masters Madrid men's tennis tournament until Caja Mágica was opened. It has a maximum seating capacity of 12,000 seats.

It is owned by the City Council of Madrid and is managed by Madrid Destino, municipal company which replaced the disappeared Madridec.

It has a maximum capacity of 10,248 spectators for basketball and 12,000 for boxing and 30,000 m^{2}. Its dome is 11,000 m^{2} and is supported by a three-dimensional structure supported on 181 piles. It has a skylight that can be opened, letting in natural light. The facade is composed of a double curve of glass, very light and variable transparency.

CB Estudiantes played its matches in the Madrid Arena from 2005 to 2010. It has signed a five-year contract with an option for another five. It hosted also all the games of the second round of the Eurobasket 2007.

== Madrid Arena tragedy ==
On 1 November 2012, a human stampede a Halloween party featuring Steve Aoki resulted in five girls being crushed to death and a further 29 people were injured. There were 16,600 people crowded into the hall, authorized for 10,600.

A few days later it was announced that the Madrid Arena was not going to host the Handball World Championship as expected, due to its safety problems. In 2015 the Spanish writer Saúl Cepeda Lezcano, who worked for the main parties blamed for the tragedy, published the novel Aforo Completo (Full House). The book uncovers many illegal activities in nightlife and clubbing activities that had led to a similar disaster.

== Transport ==
=== Metro ===
- Line 6: Alto de Extremadura station.
- Line 10: Lago station.

== Major sporting events ==
- Masters Series Madrid (annually from 2002 to 2008)
- WTA Tour Championships (7–12 November 2006)
- EuroBasket 2007 second round (September 2007)
- 2021 Davis Cup Finals (25 November – 5 December 2021)
- 2024 Valorant Champions Tour: Madrid Masters (14–24 March 2024)

== See also ==
- List of indoor arenas in Spain
- List of tennis stadiums by capacity

Preceded by Hanns-Martin-Schleyer-Halle	Mutua Madrileña Madrid Open venues 2002–2008	Succeeded by Caja Mágica
Preceded by Staples Center	WTA Tour Championships venues 2006–2007	Succeeded by Khalifa International Tennis Complex
Preceded by Palacio Vistalegre	Home of MMT Estudiantes; 2005–2010	Succeeded by Palacio de Deportes de la CAM
Preceded by Caja Mágica	Davis Cup; Finals Venue; 2021	Succeeded by Palacio de Deportes José María Martín Carpena
