= Secretary General of the Organization of American States =

Position in international organization

Secretary-General of the Organization of American States
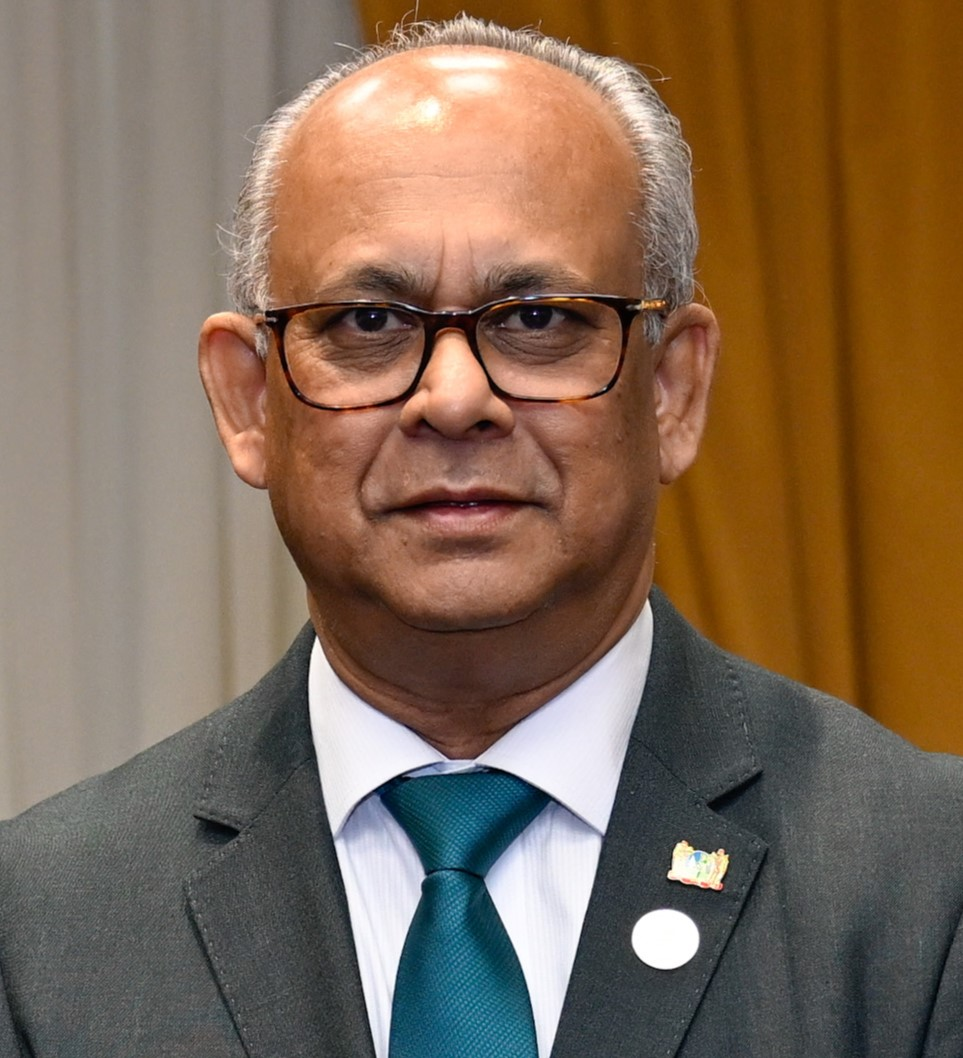
- Incumbent; Albert Ramdin since 30 May 2025
- Organization of American States
- Style: His Excellency
- Residence: Pan American Union Building
- Seat: Washington, D.C., U.S.
- Nominator: Organization of American States
- Appointer: General Assembly
- Term length: 5 years; (renewable, traditionally limited to 2 terms)
- Constituting instrument: Organization of American States
- Inaugural holder: Alberto Lleras Camargo
- Formation: 1948; 78 years ago

The Secretary General of the Organization of American States is the highest position within the Organization of American States.

== Duties ==
According to the Charter of the Organization of American States:

The Secretary General shall direct the General Secretariat, be the legal representative thereof, and [...] be responsible to the General Assembly for the proper fulfillment of the obligations and functions of the General Secretariat.

The Secretary General of the Organization shall be elected by the General Assembly for a five-year term and may not be reelected more than once or succeeded by a person of the same nationality. In the event that the office of Secretary General becomes vacant, the Assistant Secretary General shall assume his duties until the General Assembly shall elect a new Secretary General for a full term.

The Secretary General, or his representative, may participate with voice but without vote in all meetings of the Organization.

The Secretary General may bring to the attention of the General Assembly or the Permanent Council any matter which in his opinion might threaten the peace and security of the Hemisphere or the development of the Member States.

== Secretaries General of the OAS ==
| No. | Image | Name | Country | Term of Office |
|---|---|---|---|---|
| 1 | | Alberto Lleras Camargo | Colombia | 30 April 1948 – 1 August 1954 |
| 2 | | Carlos Dávila; Died while in office | Chile | 1 August 1954 – 19 October 1955 |
| 3 | | José Antonio Mora | Uruguay | 1956–1968 |
| 4 | | Galo Plaza | Ecuador | 1968–1975 |
| 5 | | Alejandro Orfila | Argentina | 1975–1984 |
| 6 | | João Clemente Baena Soares | Brazil | 1984–1994 |
| 7 | | César Gaviria; Re-elected to a second term at the 1999 General Assembly | Colombia | 15 September 1994 – 15 September 2004 |
| 8 | | Miguel Ángel Rodríguez; Resigned | Costa Rica | 15 September 2004 – 15 October 2004 |
| – | | Luigi R. Einaudi (acting) | United States | 15 October 2004 – 26 May 2005 |
| 9 | | José Miguel Insulza; Elected 2 May 2005 (see: OAS Secretary General election, 2005), re-elected on 24 March 2010 | Chile | 26 May 2005 – 26 May 2015 |
| 10 | | Luis Almagro | Uruguay | 26 May 2015 – 30 May 2025 |
| 11 | | Albert Ramdin; Elected 10 March 2005 (see: 2025 OAS elections) | Suriname | 30 May 2025 – present |

== Assistant Secretaries General of the OAS ==
The Charter specifies that:

The Assistant Secretary General shall be the Secretary of the Permanent Council. He shall serve as advisory officer to the Secretary General and shall act as his delegate in all matters that the Secretary General may entrust to him. During the temporary absence or disability of the Secretary General, the Assistant Secretary General shall perform his functions.

The Secretary General and the Assistant Secretary General shall be of different nationalities.

| No. | Image | Name | Country | Term of Office |
|---|---|---|---|---|
| 1 | | William Manger | United States | 1948–1958 |
| 2 | | William Sanders | United States | 1958–1968 |
| 3 | | M. Rafael Urquía | El Salvador | 1968–1975 |
| 4 | | Jorge Luis Zelaya Coronado | Guatemala | 1975–1980 |
| 5 | | Val T. McComie | Barbados | 1980–1990 |
| 6 | | Christopher R. Thomas | Trinidad and Tobago | 1990–2000 |
| 7 | | Luigi R. Einaudi | United States | 2000 – July 2005 |
| 8 | | Albert Ramdin | Suriname | 19 July 2005 – 2015 |
| 9 | | Nestor Mendez | Belize | 17 July 2015 – present |
