= Laura Gil Savastano =

Colombian internationalist, political scientist, journalist and diplomat

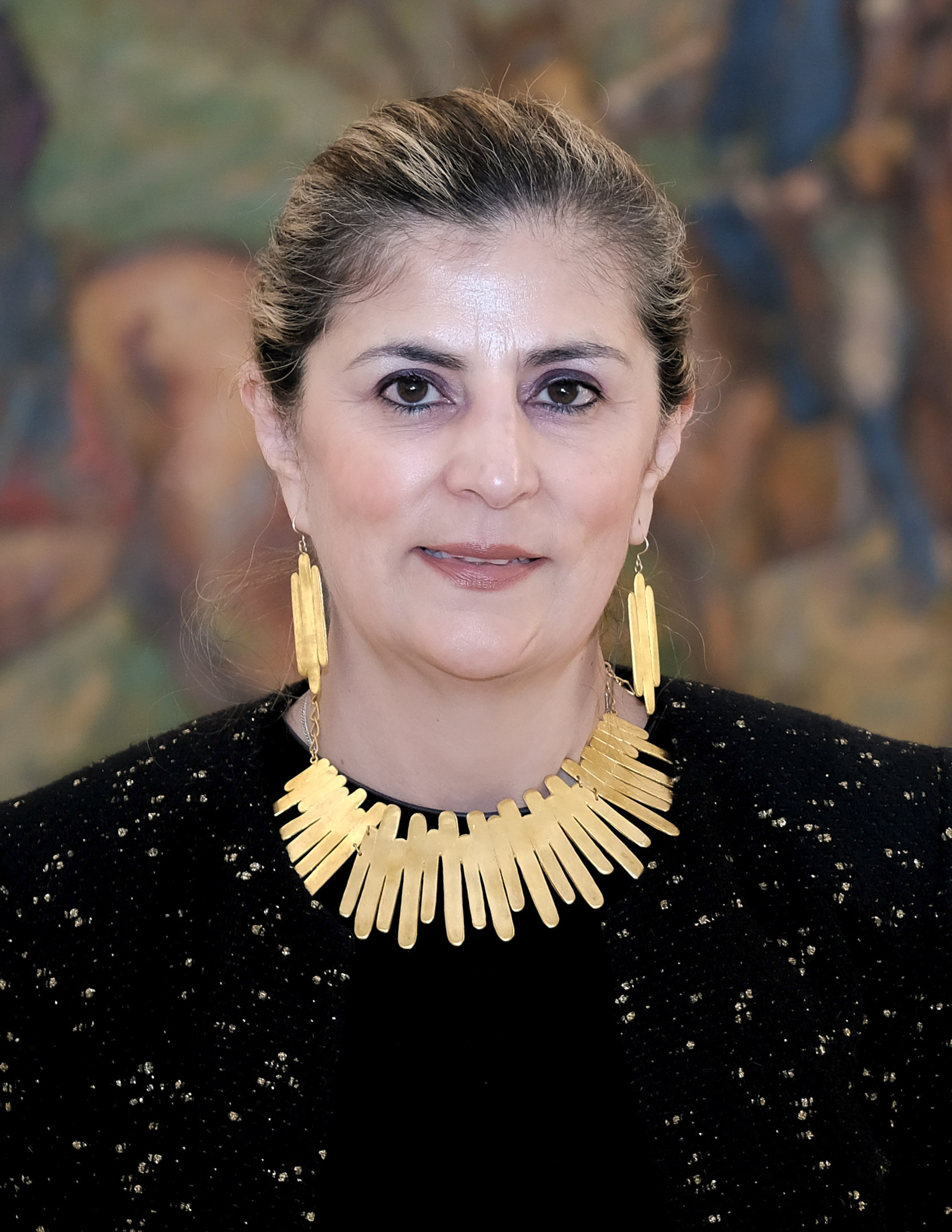

Ambassador of Colombia to Austria
- In office 4 July 2023 – 7 August 2026
- President: Gustavo Petro
- Preceded by: Miguel Ruiz

Vice Minister of Multilateral Affairs
- In office 22 August 2022 – 31 March 2023
- President: Gustavo Petro
- Minister: Álvaro Leyva
- Preceded by: María Carmelina Londoño
- Succeeded by: Elizabeth Taylor Jay

Personal details
- Born: Laura Gabriela Gil Savastano Montevideo, Uruguay
- Education: St. John's University; Fletcher School at Tufts University (BBL)

Laura Gabriela Gil Savastano is a Colombian internationalist, political scientist, journalist, media analyst, columnist, expert on human rights issues, international law and humanitarian law, born in Uruguay.

Gil was elected assistant secretary general of the Organization of American States for the 2025–2030 term in the May 2025 election.

Political offices
Preceded by María Carmelina Londoño	Vice Minister of Multilateral Affairs; 2022–2023	Succeeded by Elizabeth Taylor Jay
Diplomatic posts
Preceded by Miguel Ruiz	Ambassador of Colombia to Austria; 2023-2026	Incumbent
