= Albert Ramdin =

Surinamese diplomat (born 1958)

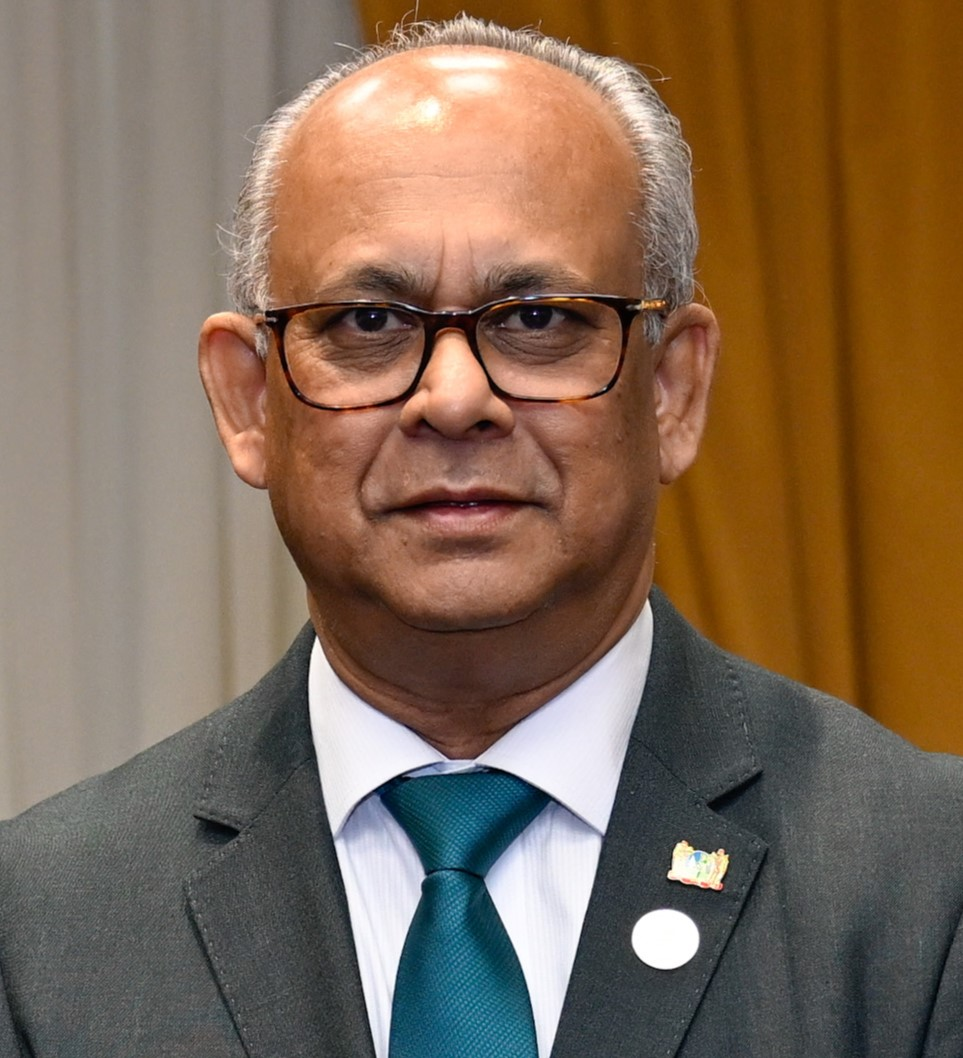
- Ramdin in 2024

11th Secretary General of the Organization of American States
- Incumbent
- Assumed office 30 May 2025
- Preceded by: Luis Almagro

Minister of Foreign Affairs, International Business and International Cooperation
- In office 16 July 2020 – 29 May 2025
- President: Chan Santokhi
- Preceded by: Yldiz Pollack-Beighle
- Succeeded by: Krishna Mathoera

Assistant Secretary General of Organization of American States
- In office 19 July 2005 – July 2015

Personal details
- Born: Albert Ramchand Ramdin; 27 February 1958 (age 68) Suriname District, Suriname
- Party: Progressive Reform Party (VHP)
- Occupation: Minister, diplomat, politician

Albert Ramchand Ramdin (born 27 February 1958) is a Surinamese diplomat serving as Minister of Foreign Affairs in the Santokhi cabinet since 16 July 2020. He is a member of the Progressive Reform Party (VHP).

He was a diplomat until 2015 and was, among other roles, Assistant Secretary General of the Organization of American States (OAS). In March 2025 he was elected to serve as the Secretary General of the OAS for the 2025–2030 term.

== Early life and education ==
Ramdin was born in Suriname District and went to secondary school in the capital city of Paramaribo. After completing secondary school, he left for the Netherlands where he studied social geography at the University of Amsterdam and the Vrije Universiteit Amsterdam.

== Career ==
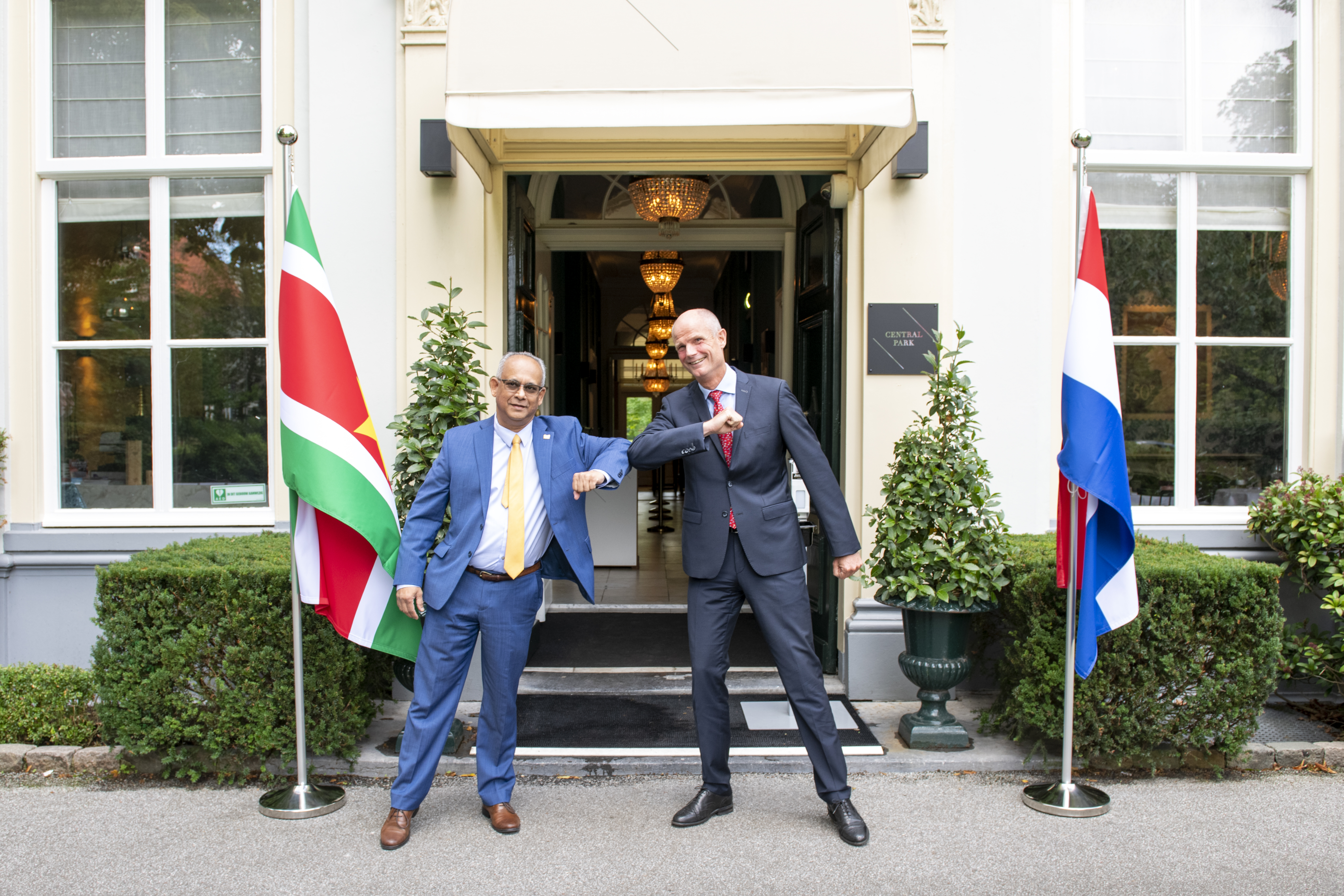
Ramdin meeting with Dutch Minister of Foreign Affairs Stef Blok in 2020.

In 1991, Ramdin became the Director of the HIMOS Development Agency in Oegstgeest, Netherlands. In 1997, Ramdin was appointed the Permanent Representative of the Organization of American States (OAS) for Suriname.

In 1999, he became assistant general for external relations at the Caribbean Community (CARICOM). In 2001, Ramdin became adviser to the Secretary General of the OAS. On 7 June 2005, Ramdin was elected Assistant Secretary General of the Organization of American States, and took office on 19 July 2005.

In July 2015, he returned to Suriname where he worked for the Ministry of Foreign Affairs. In August 2015, approximately a month after his return to Suriname, he was appointed by Minister Niermala Badrising as Ambassador at Large. In May 2016, Ramdin started working for the American gold mining company Newmont.

=== Minister of Foreign Affairs ===
On 16 July 2020, Ramdin became Minister of Foreign Affairs, International Business and International Cooperation in the cabinet of President Chan Santokhi. In August 2020, he was the first Surinamese member of government in ten years to pay an official visit to the Netherlands.

=== Secretary General of the Organization of American States ===
In early 2025, Ramdin presented his candidacy to succeed Luis Almagro as OAS Secretary General. He was elected to a five-year term on 10 March 2025.

== Awards ==
- 2009: GOPIO International Award
- 2013: CREF Award, Caribbean Renewal Energy Forum

Political offices
| Preceded by Yldiz Pollack-Beighle | Minister of Foreign Affairs, International Business and International Cooperation; 2020–2025 | Succeeded by Krishna Mathoera |
Diplomatic posts
| Preceded by Luis Almagro | Secretary General of the Organization of American States; 2025–present | Incumbent |
