= Inter-American Democratic Charter =

Instrument for strengthening and defending democracy in the Americas

The Inter-American Democratic Charter was adopted on 11 September 2001 by a special session of the General Assembly of the Organization of American States, held in Lima, Peru. It is an inter-American instrument with the central aim of strengthening and upholding democratic institutions in the nations of the Americas. The Charter, which is binding on all 34 of the currently active OAS member states, spells out what democracy entails and specifies how it should be defended when it is under threat.

== Background ==
Beginning in the 1980s, and especially after the Cold War, as international interest in multilateral action in support of human rights and democracy resulted in several conventions and treaties at the United Nations and other regional organizations of states, the Organization of American States held a series of diplomatic conferences on the issue of democracy. Democracy is one of the foundational principles of the OAS, and it was enshrined in its charter from the beginning. In 1985, the Protocol of Cartagena de Indias strengthened the charter's original language on democracy by asserting that "representative democracy is an indispensable condition for the stability, peace and development of the region" and "[t]he solidarity of the American States and the high aims which are sought through it require the political organization of those States on the basis of the effective exercise of representative democracy". However, the charter also exhorts the organization to promote democracy "with due respect for the principle of nonintervention," and lacks any mechanism for collective action among the states in defense of democracy.

The Carter Center's Americas Program advised the Organization of American States on the development of the document. The General Assembly special session in Lima at which the Democratic Charter was adopted was the reason why United States Secretary of State Colin Powell was absent from his country during the Al-Qaeda terrorist attacks of 11 September 2001; he cut short his participation at the meeting and departed Lima for Washington, D.C., shortly after midday.

== Provisions ==
Article 1 frames the purpose and goal of the Charter:

"The peoples of the Americas have a right to democracy and their governments have an obligation to promote and defend it."

Title IV establishes how the Organization is to react following "an unconstitutional interruption of the democratic order or an unconstitutional alteration of the constitutional regime that seriously impairs the democratic order in a member state." Article 19 states that such an interruption or alteration constitutes "an insurmountable obstacle to its government's participation in sessions of the General Assembly, the Meeting of Consultation, the Councils of the Organization, the specialized conferences, the commissions, working groups, and other bodies of the Organization." Consequently, Article 20 provides that following such a breakdown in a member state's constitutional regime, any other member state or the Secretary General may request the immediate convocation of the Organization's Permanent Council to undertake a collective assessment of the situation and to take such decisions as it deems appropriate. Should the Permanent Council's diplomatic efforts prove fruitless in re-establishing the constitutional order, or if the situation is deemed particularly urgent, a special session of the General Assembly may be convened to address the matter. That special session may then resolve, by a two-thirds vote of the member states, to suspend the membership of the state in question.

Once the situation that led to suspension has been resolved, the suspended member may be re-instated by a two-thirds vote of the General Assembly.

The Charter contains additional provisions dealing with actions to be adopted by member states to promote a culture of democracy within their countries, and it sets a framework for the conduction of the OAS's electoral observation missions in the member states.

== Applications ==
=== Venezuela, 2002 ===
The Inter-American Democratic Charter was formally invoked for the first time in April 2002 on the occasion of the attempted coup d'état in Venezuela that temporarily removed President Hugo Chávez from office on 11 April. The Heads of State of 19 Rio Group nations were holding a summit in San José, Costa Rica, when news of the coup broke and were able to issue a joint statement on 12 April condemning the attempted takeover and calling for a special session of the General Assembly to be held. One of the leaders who issued an immediate call for a special session was Mexican President Vicente Fox – himself no supporter of Chávez's policies and who would three years later recall his country's ambassador from Caracas after Chávez called his Mexican counterpart a "puppy dog of the Empire". As it transpired, Chávez was returned to power before any further steps could be taken to convene the General Assembly.

=== Honduras, 2009 ===
The Inter-American Democratic Charter was not invoked again until the coup d'état in Honduras in June 2009. U.S. President Barack Obama referred to the Charter in his statement regarding the coup. Obama stated he believed that the coup was in violation of the Charter.

=== Venezuela, 2014 ===
On the one-month anniversary of continued protests and political unrest in Venezuela, the U.S. Secretary of State, John Kerry, said in a hearing before the House of Representatives that the United States was prepared to invoke the Democratic Charter on Venezuela if necessary.

=== Venezuela, 2016 ===
On 19 May, the National Assembly of Venezuela formally asked Organization of American States Secretary General Luis Almagro to apply the Inter-American Democratic Charter in view of the country's economic and political situation, including the economic crisis, the de facto control by President Maduro of the judicial and electoral branches of government, a decree of "state of exception and economic emergency" passed without parliamentary approval, and threats made by President Maduro to close down the National Assembly and prevent a recall referendum promoted by the opposition. On 31 May, despite considerable criticism from left-wing countries, Almagro called an emergency meeting that could have potentially resulted in Venezuela's expulsion from the OAS.

=== Peru, 2023 ===
Due to concerns with the Congress of Peru consolidating power of Peru's institutions regarding the restructuring of the National Board of Justice (JNJ), the Center for Justice and International Law (CEJIL), Due Process of Law Foundation, Fundación Construir, Fundación para la Justicia y el Estado Democrático de Derecho (FJEDD), Human Rights Watch, the International Commission of Jurists, Observatorio Derechos y Justicia (ODJ), Robert F. Kennedy Human Rights and the Washington Office on Latin America, demanded the application of the Inter-American Democratic Charter.

== See also ==
- African Charter on Democracy, Elections and Governance
- Ushuaia Protocol
