= Charles Manga Fombad =

Cameroonian legal scholar

- Born: Cameroon
- Occupations: Legal scholar, professor
- Employer: University of Pretoria
- Known for: Comparative African constitutional law
- Title: Director, Institute for International and Comparative Law in Africa

Charles Manga Fombad is a Cameroonian legal scholar and professor of law. He is widely regarded as one of Africa's leading experts in comparative constitutional law, with additional contributions in media law, legal history, and African Union law. He is currently the Director of the Institute for International and Comparative Law in Africa (ICLA) at the University of Pretoria, South Africa.

== Early life and education ==
Fombad completed a Licence en Droit at the University of Yaoundé in Cameroon. He later obtained an LL.M. and Ph.D. in law from the University of London. He also holds a Diploma in Conflict Resolution from the University of Uppsala.

== Academic career ==
Fombad has taught law in Cameroon, Botswana, and South Africa. Prior to joining the University of Pretoria, he served as a faculty member at the University of Botswana, where he received several commendations for research excellence.

At the University of Pretoria, he has held various academic leadership positions, including:

- Head of the Department of Public Law (2010–2012)
- Director of the Institute for International and Comparative Law in Africa (ICLA)

He is a member of the Academy of Science of South Africa, an Associate Member of the International Academy of Comparative Law, and serves as a Vice President of the International Association of Constitutional Law.

== Research and scholarship ==
Fombad's research interests include:

- Comparative African constitutional law
- Legal history and mixed legal systems
- Media law
- Governance, rule of law, and constitutional implementation
- African Union law

He has played a significant role in shaping debates on constitutional design, the separation of powers, popular participation in constitution-making, and the harmonisation of customary and modern legal systems.

Fombad is the Series Editor of the Stellenbosch Handbooks in African Constitutional Law, published by Oxford University Press.

=== Publications ===
Notable works include:

- Separation of Powers in African Constitutionalism (editor)
- Comparative Research in Contemporary African Legal Studies
- Designing Institutions and Mechanisms for the Implementation and Enforcement of Constitutions
- Numerous articles in the African Human Rights Law Journal, Fundamina, and the African Journal of International and Comparative Law

== Awards and honours ==
Fombad has received several awards for research excellence, including:

- Multiple commendations from the University of Botswana Research Awards Committee (2004, 2005, 2007)
- University of Pretoria Chancellor's Award for Research (2021)

In 2024, a conference was held at the University of Pretoria's Future Africa campus to honour his contributions to African comparative constitutional scholarship.

== Professional service ==
In addition to his research and teaching, Fombad serves on editorial boards for several international academic journals. He also supervises postgraduate students and contributes to continental initiatives on constitutional governance and the rule of law.

== See also ==
- Constitutionalism
- Comparative law
- African Union law
- Vukosi Marivate
