= Protocol 1 (disambiguation) =

Protocol 1, First Protocol, or Additional Protocol may refer to:

- Protocol I to the Geneva Conventions
- Protocol 1 to the European Convention on Human Rights
- Additional Protocol to the American Convention on Human Rights, more commonly known as the Protocol of San Salvador
