= Member states of the Organization of American States =

Overview of OAS member states

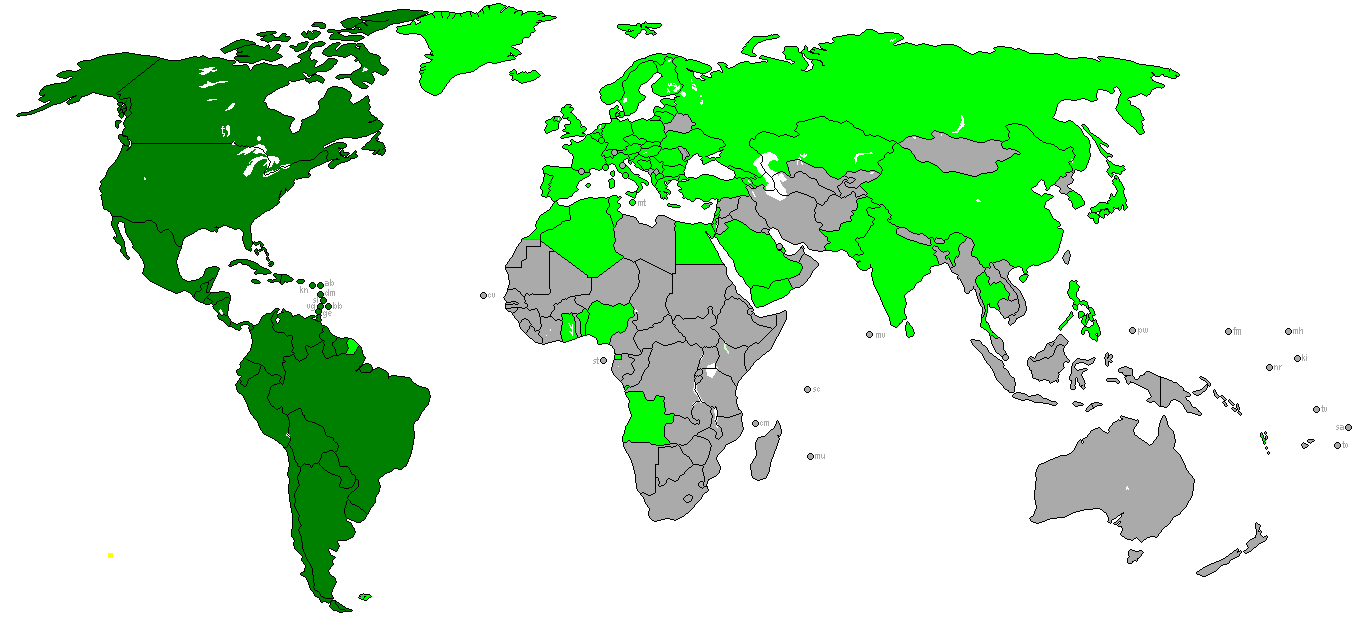
Current and former member states Observer states

33 out of 35 sovereign states of the Americas are member states of the Organization of American States (OAS); Cuba and Nicaragua are the only exceptions, although they are both former member states.

== Member states ==
When formed on 5 May 1948, there were 21 members of the OAS. The organization's membership expanded as other nations in the Americas gained full political independence as sovereign states.

| Country | Capital | Year joined | GDP (PPP) (million USD) | GDP (PPP) per capita (2020) | HDI (2018 est. for 2017) | Currency | Official or national language(s) |
|---|---|---|---|---|---|---|---|
| Antigua and Barbuda | St. John's | 1981 | 1.78 | $18,241 | 0.780 | Eastern Caribbean dollar | English |
| Argentina | Buenos Aires | 1948 | 716 | $20,771 | 0.825 | Argentine peso | Spanish |
| Bahamas | Nassau | 1982 | 11.8 | $32,538 | 0.807 | Bahamian dollar | English |
| Barbados | Bridgetown | 1967 | 7.169 | $13,349 | 0.800 | Barbadian dollar | English |
| Belize | Belmopan | 1991 | 2.38 | $6,458 | 0.708 | Belizean dollar | English |
| Bolivia | Sucre | 1948 | 55.4 | $8,275 | 0.693 | Bolivian boliviano | Spanish |
| Brazil | Brasília | 1948 | 3,012 | $14,835 | 0.759 | Brazilian real | Portuguese |
| Canada | Ottawa | 1990 | 1,519 | $46,611 | 0.926 | Canadian dollar | English; French |
| Chile | Santiago | 1948 | 386 | $25,110 | 0.843 | Chilean peso | Spanish |
| Colombia | Bogotá | 1948 | 598 | $14,931 | 0.747 | Colombian peso | Spanish |
| Costa Rica | San José | 1948 | 64 | $22,132 | 0.794 | Costa Rican colón | Spanish |
| Dominica | Roseau | 1979 | 0.91 | $10,853 | 0.715 | East Caribbean dollar | English |
| Dominican Republic | Santo Domingo | 1948 | 200 | $17,935 | 0.736 | Dominican peso | Spanish |
| Ecuador | Quito | 1948 | 165 | $10,895 | 0.752 | United States dollar | Spanish |
| El Salvador | San Salvador | 1948 | 45 | $8,420 | 0.674 | United States dollar | Spanish |
| Grenada | St. George's | 1975 | 1.142 | $15,283 | 0.772 | East Caribbean dollar | English |
| Guatemala | Guatemala City | 1948 | 113 | $8,853 | 0.650 | Guatemalan quetzal | Spanish |
| Guyana | Georgetown | 1991 | 2.70 | $19,704 | 0.654 | Guyanese dollar | English |
| Haiti | Port-au-Prince | 1948 | 13 | $3,095 | 0.498 | Haitian gourde | French |
| Honduras (Note: Suspended between 2009–2011.) | Tegucigalpa | 1948 | 33 | $5,420 | 0.617 | Honduran lempira | Spanish |
| Jamaica | Kingston | 1969 | 21 | $9,241 | 0.732 | Jamaican dollar | English |
| Mexico | Mexico City | 1948 | 2,014 | $18,444 | 0.774 | Mexican peso | Spanish |
| Panama | Panama City | 1948 | 64 | $26,782 | 0.789 | United States dollar | Spanish |
| Paraguay | Asunción | 1948 | 41 | $13,069 | 0.702 | Paraguayan guaraní | Spanish |
| Peru | Lima | 1948 | 358 | $11,878 | 0.750 | Peruvian sol | Spanish |
| Saint Kitts and Nevis | Basseterre | 1984 | 0.97 | $25,653 | 0.778 | East Caribbean dollar | English |
| Saint Lucia | Castries | 1979 | 2.02 | $12,709 | 0.747 | East Caribbean dollar | English |
| Saint Vincent and the Grenadines | Kingstown | 1981 | 1.20 | $12,705 | 0.723 | East Caribbean dollar | English |
| Suriname | Paramaribo | 1977 | 4.7 | $16,734 | 0.720 | Surinamese dollar | Dutch |
| Trinidad and Tobago | Port of Spain | 1967 | 35.6 | $25,023 | 0.784 | Trinidad and Tobago dollar | English |
| United States | Washington, D.C. | 1948 | 16,800 | $63,593 | 0.924 | United States dollar | English |
| Uruguay | Montevideo | 1948 | 62 | $22,793 | 0.804 | Uruguayan peso | Spanish |
| Venezuela (Note: On 28 April 2017, Venezuela notified the OAS of its denounciation of the Charter of the OAS, which as per Article 143 would lead to the withdraw of Venezuela from the OAS effective two years from the date of notification. During the 2019 Venezuelan presidential crisis, the President of the National Assembly of Venezuela Juan Guaidó, who was recognized by the National Assembly as the acting president, sent a letter to the OAS Secretary General annulling the previous denuncation of the OAS Charter, and expressing his desire for Venezuela to remain a member of the OAS. The National Assembly designated a special envoy as representative to the OAS, who the OAS voted to recognize as Venezuela's delegate in April.) | Caracas | 1948 | 553 | $5,177 | 0.761 | Venezuelan bolívar | Spanish |

=== Former member states ===
| Country | Capital | Year joined | GDP (PPP) (million USD) | GDP (PPP) per capita (2020) | HDI (2018 est. for 2017) | Currency | Official or national language |
|---|---|---|---|---|---|---|---|
| Cuba (Note: Suspended between 1962–2009. However, following the lifting of their suspension, a Declaration of the Revolutionary Government stated that while Cuba welcomed the Assembly's gesture, in light of the Organization's historical record "Cuba will not return to the OAS". See: Cuba–OAS relations.) | Havana | 1948 | 212 | No data | 0.777 | Cuban peso | Spanish |
| Nicaragua (Note: In November 2021, Nicaragua submitted a formal request to leave the OAS, following the OAS condemnation of the outcome of the 2021 election. The withdrawal was completed in November 2023.) | Managua | 1948 | 24.39 | $5,569 | 0.658 | Nicaraguan córdoba | Spanish |

=== Permanent missions accredited to the OAS in Washington, D.C. ===
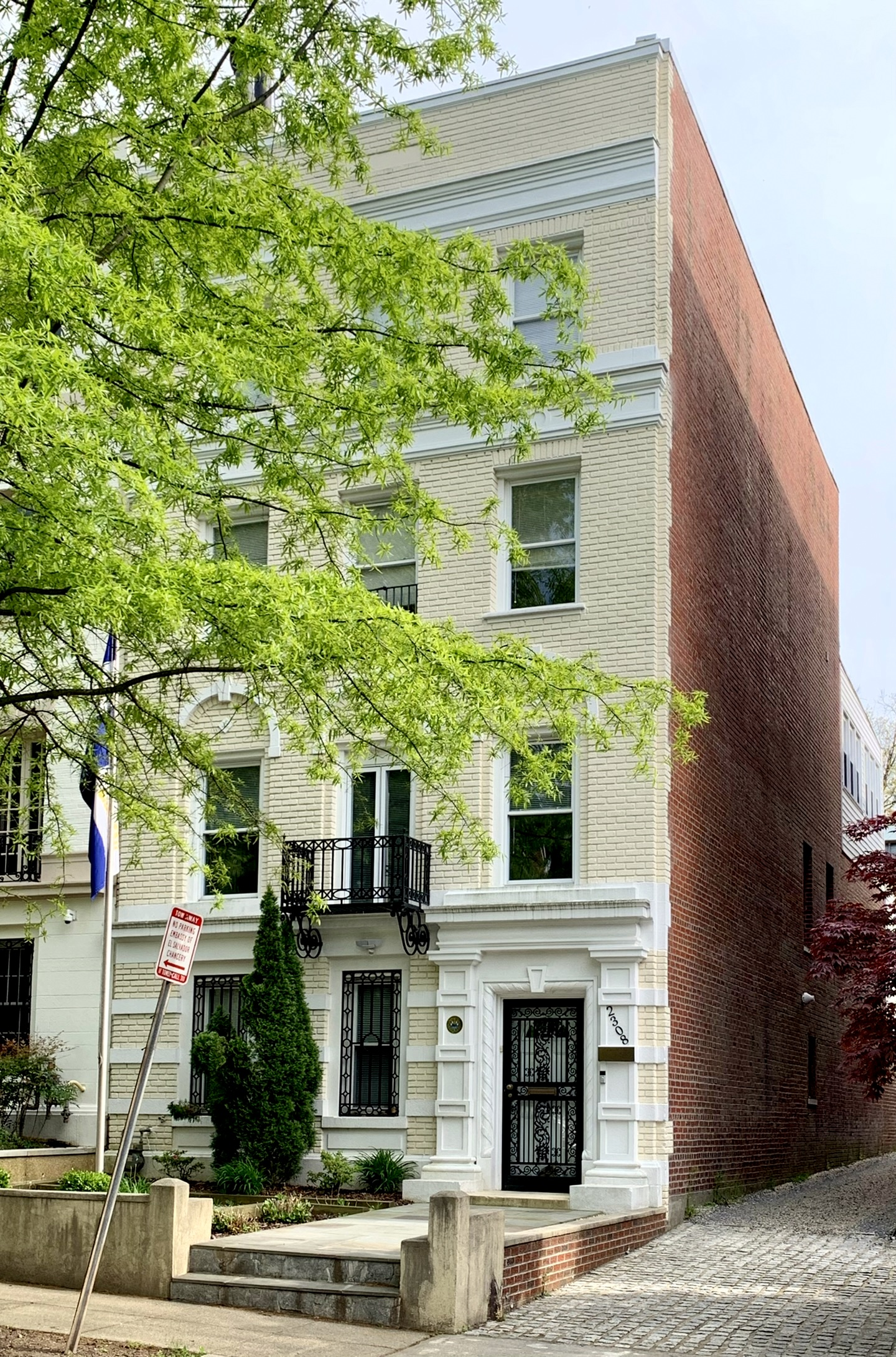
Permanent Mission of El Salvador to the OAS

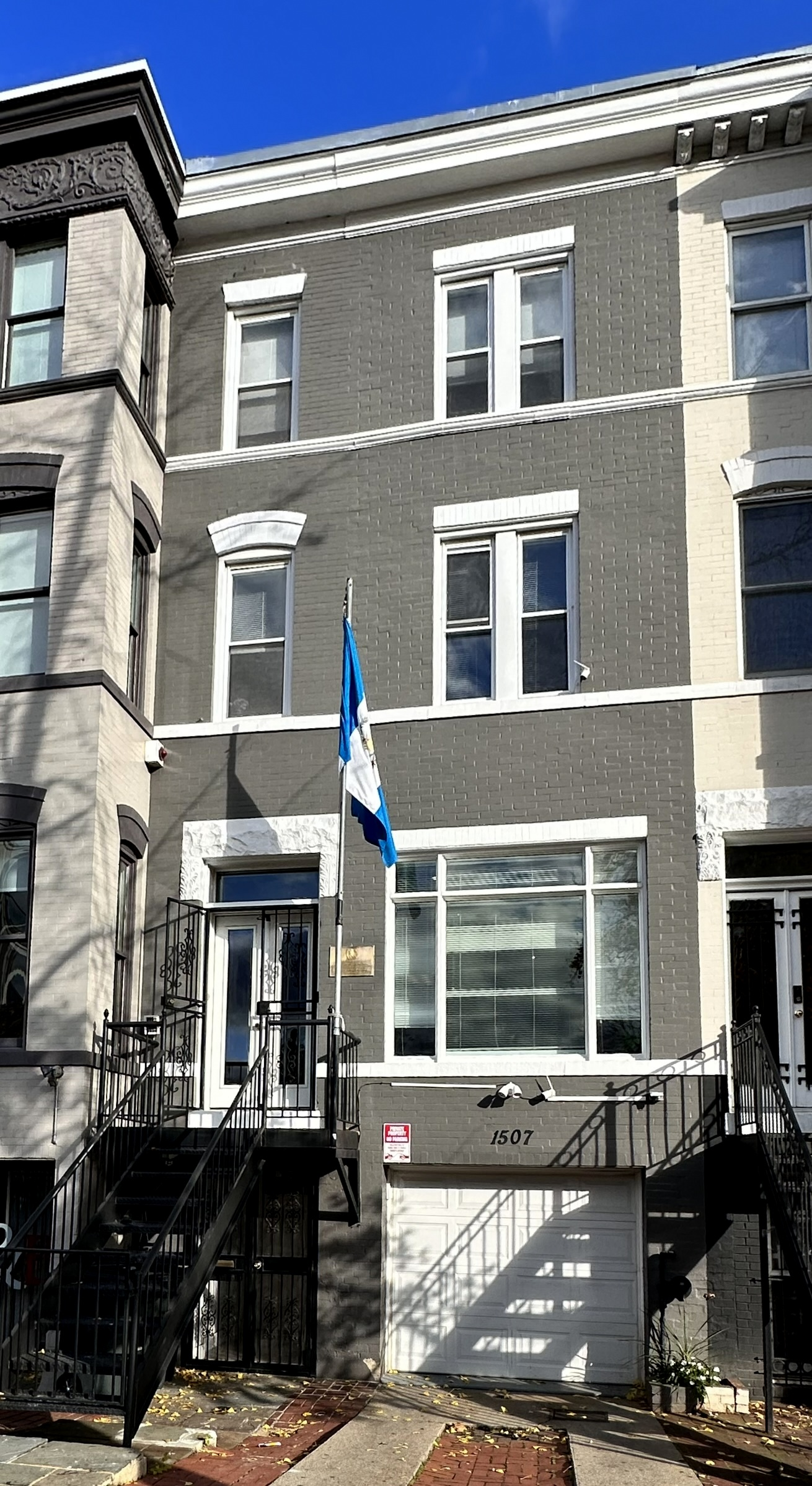
Permanent Mission of Guatemala to the OAS

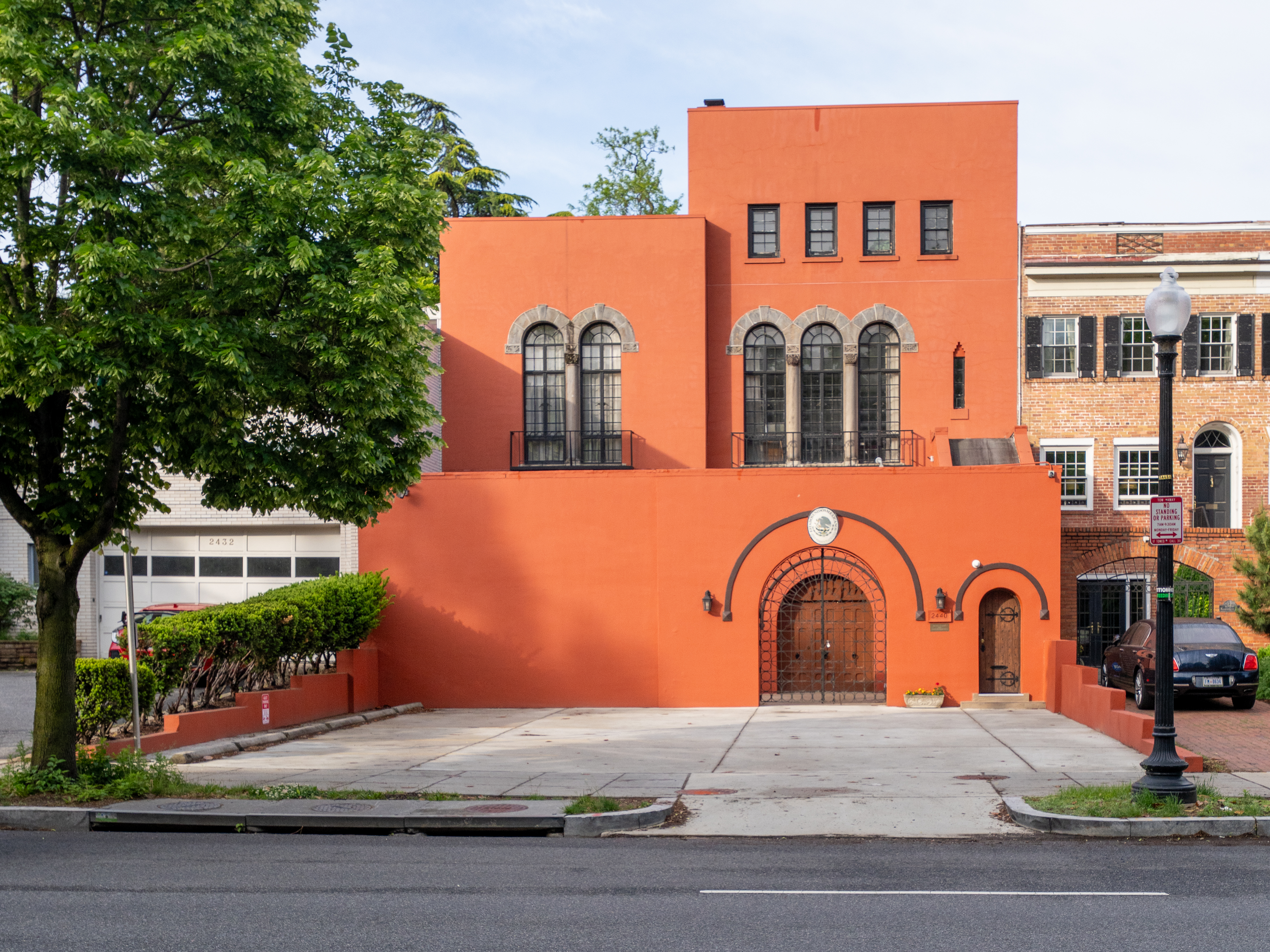
Permanent Mission of Mexico to the OAS

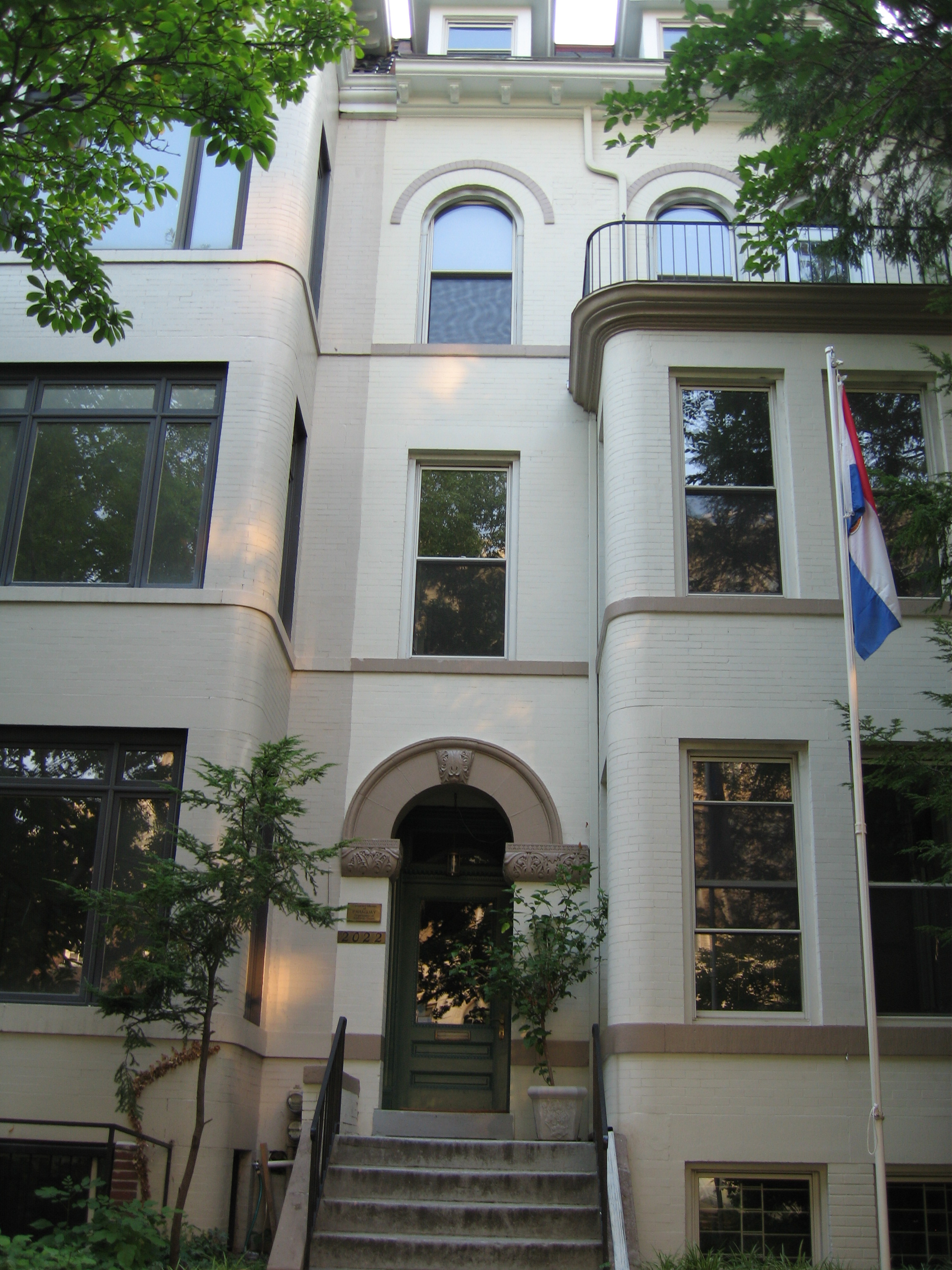
Permanent Mission of Paraguay to the OAS

== Non-member jurisdictions ==
The following jurisdictions are not members of the OAS as each is a dependent territory or overseas territory of another sovereign state. They are grouped under the parent state which has sovereignty over them.

| Territory | Parent state | Status |
|---|---|---|
| Anguilla | United Kingdom | Overseas territory |
| Aruba | Netherlands | Constituent country |
| Bermuda | United Kingdom | Overseas territory |
| Bonaire | Netherlands | Special municipality |
| Bouvet Island | Norway | Dependency |
| British Virgin Islands | United Kingdom | Overseas territory |
| Cayman Islands | United Kingdom | Overseas territory |
| Clipperton Island | France | Overseas state private property |
| Curaçao | Netherlands | Constituent country |
| Falkland Islands (Note: Claimed by Argentina as the Islas Malvinas. See: Falkland Islands sovereignty dispute.) | United Kingdom | Overseas territory |
| French Guiana | France | Overseas department and region |
| Greenland | Denmark | Autonomous territory |
| Guadeloupe | France | Overseas department and region |
| Martinique | France | Overseas department and region |
| Montserrat | United Kingdom | Overseas territory |
| Navassa Island (Note: Claimed by Haiti.) | United States | Unincorporated unorganized territory |
| Puerto Rico | United States | Unincorporated organized territory |
| Saba | Netherlands | Special municipality |
| Saint Barthélemy | France | Overseas collectivity |
| Saint Martin | France | Overseas collectivity |
| Saint Pierre and Miquelon | France | Overseas collectivity |
| Sint Eustatius | Netherlands | Special municipality |
| Sint Maarten | Netherlands | Constituent country |
| South Georgia and the South Sandwich Islands (Note: Claimed by Argentina as a part of the Islas Malvinas. See: Falkland Islands sovereignty dispute.) | United Kingdom | Overseas territory |
| Turks and Caicos Islands | United Kingdom | Overseas territory |
| U.S. Virgin Islands | United States | Unincorporated organized territory |

== Observer states ==
The observer states are:

- Albania
- Algeria
- Angola
- Armenia
- Australia
- Austria
- Azerbaijan
- Bangladesh
- Belgium
- Benin
- Bosnia and Herzegovina
- Bulgaria
- China
- Croatia
- Cyprus
- Czechia
- Denmark
- Egypt
- Equatorial Guinea
- Estonia
- European Union
- Finland
- France
- Georgia
- Germany
- Ghana
- Greece
- Hungary
- Iceland
- India
- Ireland
- Israel
- Italy
- Japan
- Kazakhstan
- Latvia
- Lebanon
- Liechtenstein
- Lithuania
- Luxembourg
- Malta
- Moldova
- Monaco
- Montenegro
- Morocco
- Netherlands
- Nigeria
- North Macedonia
- Norway
- Pakistan
- Philippines
- Poland
- Portugal
- Qatar
- Romania
- Russia (suspended)
- Saudi Arabia
- Serbia
- Slovakia
- Slovenia
- South Korea
- Spain
- Sri Lanka
- Sweden
- Switzerland
- Thailand
- Togo
- Tunisia
- Turkey
- Ukraine
- United Kingdom
- Uzbekistan
- Vanuatu
- Vatican City
- Yemen
