= Cuba–OAS relations =

Bilateral relations between Cuba and the Organization of American States

Cuba – OAS relations

- Cuba: Americas

Despite being a founding member of the Organization of American States (OAS), Cuba was effectively suspended from 31 January 1962 to 3 June 2009. Thus, for almost the entire time that the OAS has been operating, Cuba has been barred from sending representatives to the OAS and effectively had its membership suspended. It was not until 3 June 2009 that foreign ministers of OAS member countries assembled for the OAS's 39th General Assembly in San Pedro Sula, Honduras, passed a vote to lift Cuba's suspension from the OAS.

== Prerevolution background ==
Cuba was one of the 21 initial members of the OAS upon foundation in Bogotá on 5 May 1948. The Organization, first led by Colombian Alberto Lleras Camargo, was created "to achieve an order of peace and justice, to promote their solidarity, to strengthen their collaboration, and to defend their sovereignty, their territorial integrity, and their independence".

== Post-revolution relations ==
Following the Cuban Revolution of 1959, relations between Cuba and the United States began to deteriorate rapidly. Initially, however, the nations that comprised the Organization of American States were reluctant to be drawn on the issue of Cuba's representation at the organization. The United States favored collective action against Cuba with the stated aim, as forwarded by President John F. Kennedy, of isolating Cuba politically and economically. At a meeting of foreign ministers in August 1960, most nations refused to comment on the status of Cuba. Some, like Mexico and Argentina were adamant to remain impartial and stressed that the issue was a private quarrel between Cuba and the United States.

In 1961, Venezuela and Colombia broke off diplomatic relations with Cuba and a new meeting was called between the OAS nations. By a vote of 14 to 2, with five nations abstaining, the OAS timetabled a council meeting for January 1962. In the buildup to that meeting Argentinian President Arturo Frondizi outlined his reservations to Washington's plans, stating that the U.S. was "obsessed with Cuba at the expense of the needs of the hemisphere" and that retaliation against the island would only strengthen Fidel Castro. States were also concerned about how any anti-Cuban measure would be perceived by the largely pro-Castro populations of Latin America. Pressure from the United States continued via U.S. ambassador to the OAS DeLesseps Morrison.

== Punta del Este gathering ==
On 21 January 1962, the OAS held the Eighth Meeting of Consultation of the Ministers of Foreign Affairs in Punta del Este, Uruguay. The United States had encouraged Central American representatives to advocate a hard line against Cuba, and to walk out if sanctions were not tabled. Argentina, Brazil, Mexico, Chile, Bolivia and Ecuador were opposed to sanctions, Uruguay and Haiti were uncertain. United States Secretary of State Dean Rusk was hopeful that 14 votes, two thirds of the council would suffice to ensure U.S. policy in the region. After initial talks, the foreign minister of Haiti had a series of private discussions with the U.S. party. As a result, the U.S. agreed to resume aid to the nation in return for their support of sanctions against Cuba. Aid to Haiti had been suspended following the rise of the authoritarian autocrat François Duvalier.

Argentina proposed a compromise that would see Cuba expelled from the organization. The proposal would also be supplemented by partial economic sanctions and the establishment of a special security committee. This was accepted by the U.S. who agreed to defend the new scheme. In his key speech to the organization, Dean Rusk stated that Cuba's alignment with the Sino-Soviet bloc was incompatible with the inter-American system, and such measures were imperative.

Though only 14 nations voted explicitly to exclude Cuba from the organization, all twenty republics supported the declaration forwarded by the U.S. Seventeen states voted to suspend arms sales to Cuba, 16 voted to follow this with a trade embargo, and 19 voted to create a Committee of Experts to combat "Cuba's subversive activities".

== Conclusions of the decision ==
The vote was passed by 14 in favor, with one against (Cuba) and six abstentions (Argentina, Bolivia, Brazil, Chile, Ecuador, and Mexico). The operative part of the resolution read as follows:

1. That adherence by any member of the Organization of American States to Marxism–Leninism is incompatible with the inter-American system and the alignment of such a government with the communist bloc breaks the unity and solidarity of the hemisphere.
2. That the present Government of Cuba, which has officially identified itself as a Marxist–Leninist government, is incompatible with the principles and objectives of the inter-American system.
3. That this incompatibility excludes the present Government of Cuba from participation in the inter-American system.

This means that the Cuban nation was still technically a member state, but that the current government was denied the right of representation and attendance at meetings and of participation in activities. The OAS's position was that although Cuba's participation is suspended, its obligations under the Charter, the American Declaration of the Rights and Duties of Man, etc. still hold: for instance, the Inter-American Commission on Human Rights continued to publish reports on Cuba's human rights situation and to hear individual cases involving Cuban nationals. However, this stance was occasionally questioned by other individual member states.

Cuba's position was stated in an official note sent to the Organization "merely as a courtesy" by Minister of Foreign Affairs Dr. Raúl Roa on 4 November 1964: "Cuba was arbitrarily excluded ... The Organization of American States has no juridical, factual, or moral jurisdiction, nor competence, over a state which it has illegally deprived of its rights."

Moreover, although Cuba was suspended and thus disengaged from the Organization of American States in 1962, it maintained active participation in the Pan American Health Organization (PAHO), the OAS’s specialized health agency and the regional office for the World Health Organization (WHO). In fact, Cuba has a long history with PAHO, dating back to its involvement with PAHO's predecessor, with Cuban physician Dr. Juan Guiteras serving on the first executive board.

PAHO has served as a unique space for geopolitics as a forum in which Cuba and the United States have continued to interact, even during times of political contention, with both countries using and engaging with PAHO to achieve their objectives. The United States, for example, worked with PAHO on its Alliance for Progress initiative through the OAS, which focused on building economic cooperation between North and South America. PAHO notably achieved and facilitated significant investments in public health such as the creation of a fund for public water investments. Cuba and PAHO have engaged extensively on Cuba's public health system and global health initiatives, namely through support of its state-run healthcare system as well as its medical internationalism efforts. One significant example was its engagement with the Mais Médicos program, where PAHO served as a key intermediary.

== Rapprochement attempts ==
The reincorporation of Cuba as an active member regularly arose as a topic within the inter-American system (e.g., it was intimated by the outgoing ambassador of Mexico in 1998) but most observers did not see it as a serious possibility while the present government remained in power. Since 1960, the Cuban administration had repeatedly characterized the OAS as the "Ministry of Colonies" of the United States of America. On 6 May 2005, President Fidel Castro reiterated that the island nation would not "be part of a disgraceful institution that has only humiliated the honor of Latin American nations".

On 3 June 2009, foreign ministers assembled in San Pedro Sula, Honduras, for the OAS's 39th General Assembly, passed a vote to lift Cuba's suspension from the OAS. In its resolution (AG/RES 2438), the General Assembly decided that:

1. Resolution VI, ... which excluded the Government of Cuba from its participation in the Inter-American system, hereby ceases to have effect
2. The participation of the Republic of Cuba in the OAS will be the result of a process of dialogue initiated at the request of the Government of Cuba, and in accordance with the practices, purposes, and principles of the OAS.

The United States had been urging for weeks that the OAS base Cuba's readmission to the hemispheric group on prerequisites of democratic principles and a commitment to human rights; after the vote was announced, it was pleased with the results. Ecuador's Foreign Minister Fander Falconí said, "This is a new proposal, it has no conditions – of any kind", Falconí said. "That suspension was made in the Cold War, in the language of the Cold War. What we have done here is to fix a historic error."

In an editorial published by Granma, Fidel Castro applauded the Assembly's "rebellious" move and said that the date would "be recalled by future generations". However, a Declaration of the Revolutionary Government dated 8 June 2009 stated that while Cuba welcomed the Assembly's gesture, in light of the Organization's historical record "Cuba will not return to the OAS". As recently as January 2014 Cuban Foreign Minister Bruno Rodriguez has said that "Cuba’s position in relation to the OAS remains unchanged, we will not return to it".

Although the member states of the OAS have taken steps as detailed above, which advocated for Cuba's reintegration into the OAS, the organization has not taken similar steps, with the Inter-American Commission on Human Rights (IACHR) issuing reports criticizing Cuba's human rights record, highlighting restrictions on political freedoms, judicial independence, free expression, and more. Moreover, OAS leadership such as Secretary-General Luis Almagro has also been vocal in his criticism of Cuba and its human rights record.

== See also ==
- United States embargo against Cuba
- Foreign relations of Cuba
