= Flag of the Organization of American States =

Organization of American States
- Proportion: 17:30
- Adopted: 1965; 61 years ago
- Design: The OAS' emblem defacing a light blue field.

The flag of the Organization of American States is one of the official symbols of the Organization of American States (OAS); it consists of the OAS' emblem defacing a light blue field.

== History ==
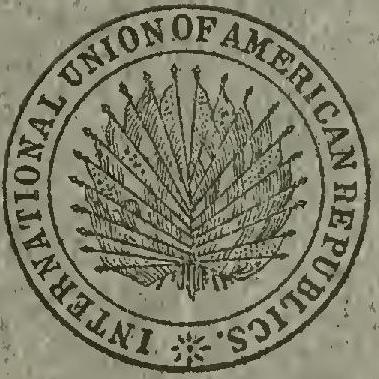
Emblem that was already used in Pan-Americanism in 1909.

It was adopted in 1965 and has been amended several times as new members have joined the OAS. The flag of the Organization of American States was used for the first time during the administration of Secretary General José Antonio Mora. The flag consists of the seal of the Organization, which represents the flags of all the Member States, on a royal blue background. This stamp with the flags is seen for the first time on memorandum paper in the twenties, during the General Direction of Mr. Leo S. Rowe. The flag was ordered to the company Annin & Co., of New York, in April 1961. The color of the fund that was chosen was real blue that was neither light blue, nor dark blue. In the center are the flags of all the member countries placed in a circular shape, with ten masts at the bottom and framed by a circle. The design was updated for the last time in 1991 when Belize and Guyana joined the Organization of American States. Each time a new member state enters, its flag is incorporated into the design. The use of the flag has been established in accordance with the traditions and customs in exercise throughout the years in the Organization.

== Vexillological description ==
The design consists of a rectangle of blue background with a white circle, bordered in gold, in its center. On the inside of this circle is the organization shell consisting of a grouping of flags of all member states, which are currently 35, hoisted on golden masts. The order of the flags is given in Spanish alphabetical order, starting with Antigua and Barbuda in the lower left, following clockwise until Venezuela in the lower right.
