= American Declaration of the Rights and Duties of Man =

1948 treaty and human rights instrument

- Signed: April 1948
- Location: Bogotá, Colombia
- Effective: 2 May 1948

Full text
- American Declaration of the Rights and Duties of Man at Wikisource

The American Declaration of the Rights and Duties of Man, also known as the Bogota Declaration, was the world's first international human rights instrument of a general nature, predating the Universal Declaration of Human Rights by less than a year.

Although a declaration is not, strictly speaking, a legally binding treaty, the jurisprudence of both the Inter-American Court of Human Rights and the Inter-American Commission on Human Rights has established that the declaration gives rise to binding international obligations for OAS member states. The declaration has been largely superseded in practice by the more detailed provisions of the American Convention on Human Rights (in force since 18 July 1978); it continues to be applied, however, to states that have not ratified the Convention, such as Cuba, the United States, and Canada.

All men are born free and equal, in dignity and in rights, and, being endowed by nature with reason and conscience, they should conduct themselves as brothers one to another.

— Preamble, American Declaration of the Rights and Duties of Man

== History ==
The declaration was adopted by the nations of the Americas at the Ninth International Conference of American States in Bogotá, Colombia, on 2 May 1948. The conference and declaration was led and designed chiefly by United States public servants. The same conference adopted the Charter of the Organization of American States and thereby created the OAS.

== Contents ==
Chapter One of the declaration sets forth a catalogue of civil and political rights to be enjoyed by the citizens of the signatory nations, together with additional economic, social, and cultural rights due to them. As a corollary, its second chapter contains a list of corresponding duties. As explained in the preamble:

The fulfillment of duty by each individual is a prerequisite to the rights of all. Rights and duties are interrelated in every social and political activity of man. While rights exalt individual liberty, duties express the dignity of that liberty.
