= African Union law =

African Union law is the body of law comprising treaties, resolutions and decisions that have direct and indirect application to the member States of the African Union (AU). Similar to European Union law, AU law regulates the behavior of countries party to the regional body.

== Sources of African Union law ==
African Union law is based on several sources, which include constitutional documents, Treaties, Decisions of the policy organs of the AU, African customary international law, soft laws, regional courts decisions and future laws to be enacted by the Pan African Parliament. These also include some of the Treaties, Resolutions and Declarations of the AU's predecessor organisation, the Organisation of African Unity. The main legal instruments of African Union law include the Constitutive Act of the African Union, the African Charter on Human and Peoples' Rights, the African Charter on the Rights and Welfare of the Child, the African Charter on Democracy, Elections and Governance and the Treaty Establishing the African Economic Community.

Examples of soft law instruments include the Declaration on Gender Equality in Africa, Guidelines and Measures for the Prohibition and Prevention of Torture, Cruel, Inhuman or Degrading Treatment or Punishment in Africa (The Robben Island Guidelines), Declaration of the Principles on Freedom of Expression in Africa, Ouagadougou Declaration and Plan of Action on Accelerating Prisons and Penal Reforms in Africa, Principles and Guidelines on the Implementation of Economic, Social and Cultural Rights in the African Charter on Human and Peoples' Rights, Guidelines for African Union Electoral Observations and Monitoring Missions, Pretoria Declaration on Economic, Social and Cultural Rights in Africa, Kigali Declaration, and Principles and Guidelines on the Right to a Fair Trial and Legal Assistance In Africa and Grand Bay (Mauritius) Declaration and Plan of Action.

== Development of law and legal norms ==
In January 2017, a research project was established at the University of Sussex Law School, UK, on the concept of AU law. The project received initial funding from the Arts and Humanities Research Council, funding the project through 2019. The project explores the emergence of AU law as a new legal order and its implications for existing legal order in the region.

A number of academics have advocated further developing the legal framework of the African Union to advance regional goals. Professor Michèle Olivier of the University of Hull has suggested that "African Union law will hold member states accountable to comply with international and continentally agreed standards on, inter alia, democracy, good governance and human rights."

== Bibliography ==
- O Amao, "African union law: the emergence of a sui generis legal order" (Routledge, 2019)
- M Olivier, "The role of African Union law in integrating Africa" (2015) 22 (4) South African Journal of International Affairs 513–533
- M Olivier, "Despite Brexit, the EU still holds valuable lessons for African integration" (2017) The Conversation
- Abdulqawi A. Yusuf and Fatsah Ouguergouz, The African Union: Legal and Institutional Framework: A Manual on the Pan-African Organization (Martinus Nijhoff, 2012)
- KD Magliveras and GJ Naldi, The African Union (AU) (Wolters Kluwer, 2013) 93
- Babatunde Olaitan Fagbayibo, A politico-legal framework for integration in Africa: Exploring the attainability of a supranational African Union (2010) University of Pretoria
- Babatunde Fagbayigbo, "Why the African Union needs to revisit its admission criteria" (2017) The Conversation
- African Union Law Research Network, Newsletter, Edition 1, Vol 1
