= Executive Secretary for Integral Development =

The Executive Secretariat for Integral Development (SEDI) is one of seven Secretariats that operate under the direction of the General Secretariat of the Organization of American States. The department's stated mission is to support and facilitate the development of Democracy, multilateral security, and human rights in the 35 member states of the OAS. SEDI operates in six main issue areas, and has a corresponding office for each issue. These include: Education and Culture; Trade and Tourism; Sustainable Development; Social Development and Employment; Science and Technology; and Human Development.

== External sources ==
http://www.oas.org
