= Organization of American States =

International organization

(in other official languages)
Spanish	Organización de los Estados Americanos
French	Organisation des États américains
Portuguese	Organização dos Estados Americanos
- Flag Emblem
- Motto: "Democracy for peace, security and development"
- The OAS as of 2022 Member states Disputed member state Former member states
- Headquarters: 17th Street and Constitution Avenue NW, Washington, D.C., U.S. 38°53′34″N 77°02′25″W
- Largest Metropolis: São Paulo
- Official languages: English; French; Portuguese; Spanish
- Member states: 33 states: Antigua and Barbuda; Argentina; Bahamas, The; Barbados; Belize; Bolivia; Brazil; Canada; Chile; Colombia; Costa Rica; Dominica; Dominican Republic; Ecuador; El Salvador; Grenada; Guatemala; Guyana; Haiti; Honduras; Jamaica; Mexico; Panama; Paraguay; Peru; Saint Kitts and Nevis; Saint Lucia; Saint Vincent and the Grenadines; Suriname; Trinidad and Tobago; United States; Uruguay; Venezuela (Note: On 28 April 2017, Venezuela notified the OAS of its denunciation of the Charter of the OAS, which as per Article 143 would lead to the withdrawal of Venezuela from the OAS effective two years from the date of notification. During the 2019 Venezuelan presidential crisis, the President of the National Assembly of Venezuela Juan Guaidó, who was recognized by the National Assembly as the acting president, sent a letter to the OAS Secretary General annulling the previous denunciation of the OAS Charter, and expressing his desire for Venezuela to remain a member of the OAS. The National Assembly designated a special envoy as representative to the OAS, who the OAS voted to recognize as Venezuela's delegate in April. The interim government of Guaidó was later dissolved in 2022, with the chavista state being the only government structure remaining.)

Leaders
  - Secretary General: (Suriname) Albert Ramdin
  - Assistant Secretary General: (Colombia) Laura Gil Savastano

Establishment
  - Charter: 30 April 1948

Area
  - Total: 40,275,678 km^{2} (15,550,526 sq mi)

Population
  - 2023 estimate: 1,028,404,247
- Time zone: UTC−10 to +0
- Website oas.org

A clickable Euler diagram showing the relationships between various multinational organizations in the Americas

The Organization of American States (OAS or OEA; Spanish: Organización de los Estados Americanos; Portuguese: Organização dos Estados Americanos; French: Organisation des États américains) is an international organization founded on 30 April 1948 to promote cooperation among its member states within the Americas.

Headquartered in Washington, D.C., United States, the OAS is a voluntary "multilateral regional body focused on human rights, electoral oversight, social and economic development, and security in the Western Hemisphere", according to the Council on Foreign Relations. As of November 2023, 32 states in the Americas are OAS members.

Albert Ramdin of Suriname was inaugurated as OAS secretary general in May 2025, replacing Luis Almagro of Uruguay.

== History ==
=== 19th century ===
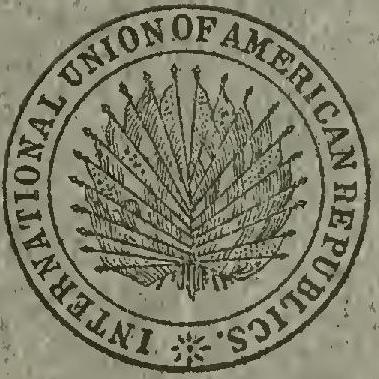
The International Union of American Republics' logo in 1909

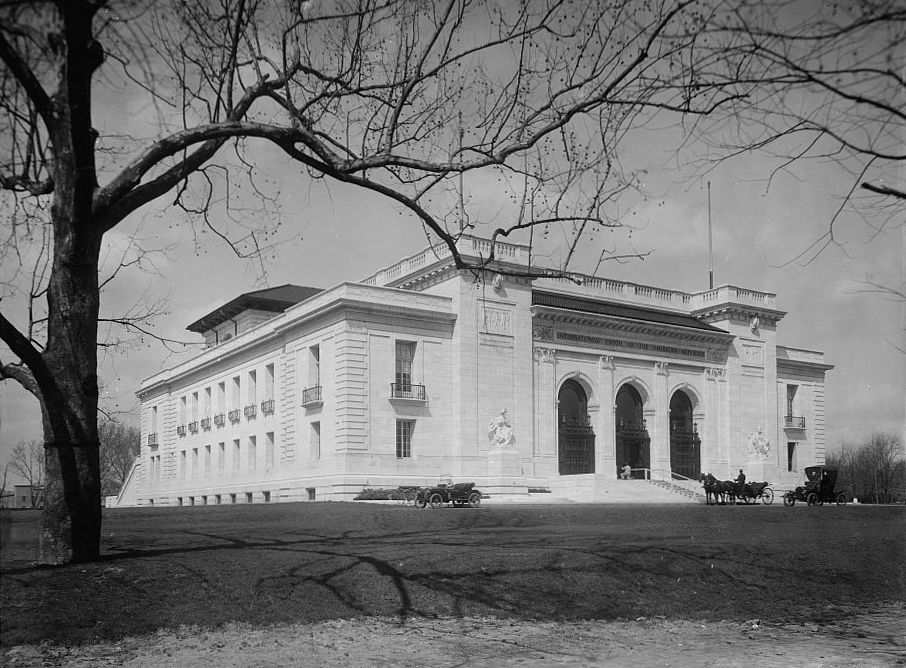
The Pan American Union Building in 1910, shortly after its construction in Washington, D. C.

The notion of an international union in the American continent was first put forward during the liberation of America by José de San Martín and Simón Bolívar who, at the 1826 Congress of Panama, still being part of Colombia, proposed creating a league of American republics, with a common military, a mutual defense pact, and a supranational parliamentary assembly. The meeting was attended by representatives of Gran Colombia (comprising the present-day countries of Colombia, Ecuador, Panama, and Venezuela), Argentina, Peru, Bolivia, the United Provinces of Central America, and Mexico but the grandly titled "Treaty of Union, League, and Perpetual Confederation" was ultimately ratified only by Gran Colombia. Bolívar's dream soon floundered with civil war in Gran Colombia, the disintegration of Central America, and the emergence of national rather than New World outlooks in the newly independent American republics. Bolívar's dream of inter-American unity was meant to unify Hispanic American nations against external powers.

==== Founding of the International Union of American Republics ====
The pursuit of regional solidarity and cooperation again came to the forefront in 1889–1890, at the First International Conference of American States. Gathered together in Washington, D.C., 18 nations resolved to found the International Union of American Republics, served by a permanent secretariat called the Commercial Bureau of the American Republics (renamed the International Commercial Bureau at the Second International Conference in 1901–1902). These two bodies, in existence as of 14 April 1890, represent the point of inception to which the OAS and its General Secretariat trace their origins.

=== 20th century ===
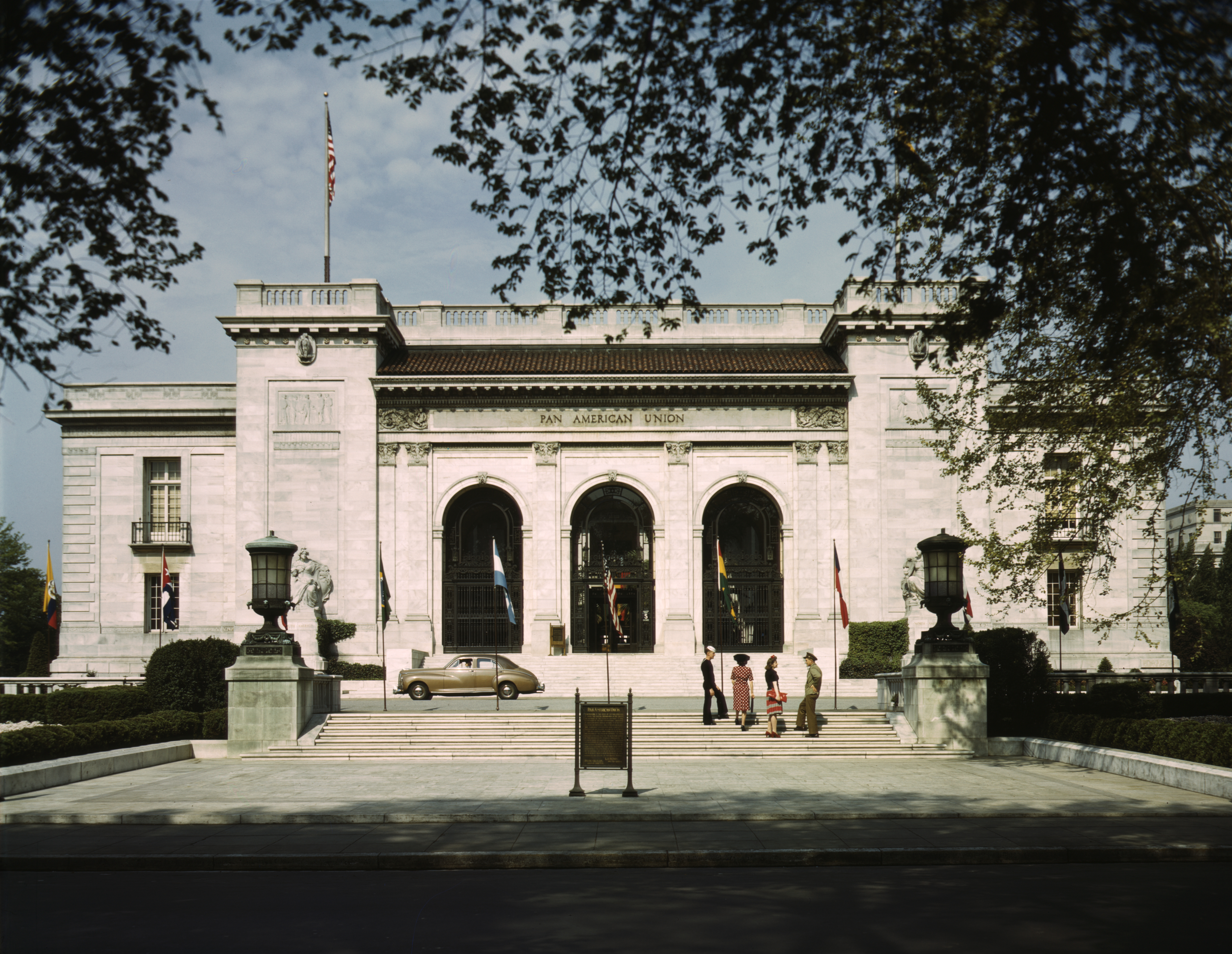
Pan American Union headquarters building in Washington, D.C. in 1943

At the fourth International Conference of American States (Buenos Aires, 1910), the name of the organization was changed to the Union of American Republics and the Bureau became the Pan American Union. The Pan American Union Building was constructed in 1910, on Constitution Avenue, Northwest, Washington, D.C.

In the mid-1930s, U.S. President Franklin Delano Roosevelt organized an inter-American conference in Buenos Aires. One of the items at the conference was a "League of Nations of the Americas", an idea proposed by Colombia, Guatemala, and the Dominican Republic. At the subsequent Inter-American Conference for the Maintenance of Peace, 21 nations pledged to remain neutral in the event of a conflict between any two members. At the 1933 OAS convention in Montevideo, member states agreed to not recognize territorial acquisitions obtained by force. At the 1936 convention in Buenos Aires, member states agreed to enter into a process of arbitration in case there was a threat to peace.

The experience of World War II convinced hemispheric governments that unilateral action could not ensure the territorial integrity of the American nations in the event of external aggression. To meet the challenges of global conflict in the postwar world and to contain conflicts within the hemisphere, they adopted a system of collective security, the Inter-American Treaty of Reciprocal Assistance (Rio Treaty) signed in 1947 in Rio de Janeiro.

==== Creation of the OAS ====
The ninth International Conference of American States was held in Bogotá between March and May 1948 and led by United States Secretary of State George Marshall, a meeting which led to a pledge by members to fight communism in the Western Hemisphere. This was the event that saw the birth of the OAS as it stands today, with the signature by 21 American countries of the Charter of the Organization of American States on 30 April 1948 (in effect since December 1951). The meeting also adopted the American Declaration of the Rights and Duties of Man, the world's first general human rights instrument.

The transition from the Pan American Union to OAS would have been smooth if it had not been for the assassination of Colombian leader Jorge Eliécer Gaitán. The Director General of the Pan American Union, Alberto Lleras Camargo, became the Organization's first Secretary General.

=== 21st century ===
The OAS emblem with its official name in English

The OAS conducted an audit of the 2019 Bolivian general election, which opposition supporters argued was fraudulent. The OAS report contended that the results were marred by "clear manipulation" and significant irregularities leading to the 2019 Bolivian political crisis. Bolivian president Evo Morales resigned soon after, having lost the confidence of the country's military in what he described as a coup. Some media outlets debated whether it should be referred to as a coup. On 21 December, the Technical Mission of Electoral Experts sent by the European Union published a 67-page report which made similar observations and conclusions to that of the OAS. They noted that "there were minutes with an unusually high number of null votes, blank votes and a hundred percent participation of voters in a series of polling stations" and highlighted the general failure of the TSE to declare these irregularities. Studies commissioned by the American left-leaning think tank CEPR argued that the OAS report's statistical analysis was inaccurate and unreliable. The author of the OAS's vote return analysis stated that the CEPR's explanation of the results was implausible. The organization has been criticized by Mexico and the CEPR for their perception of interference into the internal affairs of Bolivia. The OAS observed the subsequent 2020 Bolivian general election stating there was no evidence of fraud. The New York Times concluded that there was some fraud, but that it was unclear how much or if it was sufficient to change the result of the election, and suggested the initial analysis by the OAS was flawed and that the OAS consultant refused to share the data or methods of the OAS analysis.

In November 2021, OAS condemned the outcome of the Nicaraguan general election. In April 2022, Nicaragua reported the completion of its withdrawal process from the OAS initiated in November 2021. The OAS stated that, due to the terms of treaty, the withdrawal would not take effect until 2023. The move was completed on 19 November that year.

=== Milestones ===
Significant milestones in the history of the OAS since the signing of the Charter have included the following:

- 1959: Inter-American Commission on Human Rights created.
- 1959: Inter-American Development Bank created.
- 1960: First application of the Inter-American Treaty of Reciprocal Assistance against the regime of Rafael Trujillo in the Dominican Republic.
- 1961: Charter of Punta del Este signed, launching the Alliance for Progress.
- 1962: OAS suspends Cuba.
- 1969: American Convention on Human Rights signed (in force since 1978).
- 1970: OAS General Assembly established as the Organization's supreme decision-making body.
- 1979: Inter-American Court of Human Rights created.
- 1991: Adoption of Resolution 1080, which requires the Secretary General to convene the Permanent Council within ten days of a coup d'état in any member country.
- 1994: First Summit of the Americas (Miami), which resolved to establish a Free Trade Area of the Americas by 2005.
- 2001: Inter-American Democratic Charter adopted.
- 2009: OAS revokes 1962 suspension of Cuba.
- 2009: OAS suspends Honduras due to the coup which ousted president Manuel Zelaya.
- 2011: OAS lifts the suspension of Honduras with the return of Manuel Zelaya from exile.
- 2017: Venezuela announces it would begin the process to leave the OAS, accusing the organization of interference in Venezuela's political crisis.
- 2019: During the Venezuelan presidential crisis, the President of the National Assembly Juan Guaidó, recognized by the National Assembly as the acting president, expressed his desire for Venezuela to remain a member of the OAS. The OAS voted to recognize Gustavo Tarre Briceño as Venezuela's delegate in April, the National Assembly's representative to the OAS.
- 2020: OAS concluded that the 2019 Bolivian general election was fraudulent.
- 2021: Nicaragua submitted a formal request to leave the OAS, following condemnation from the OAS General Assembly of Foreign Ministers of the outcome of the 2021 election.
- 2023: Nicaragua completed its withdrawal from the OAS.

== Goals and purpose ==
In the words of Article 1 of the Charter, the goal of the member nations in creating the OAS was "to achieve an order of peace and justice, to promote their solidarity, to strengthen their collaboration, and to defend their sovereignty, their territorial integrity, and their independence." Article 2 then defines eight essential purposes:

- To strengthen the peace and security of the continent.
- To promote and consolidate representative democracy, with due respect for the principle of non-intervention.
- To prevent possible causes of difficulties and to ensure the pacific settlement of disputes that may arise among the member states.
- To provide for common action on the part of those states in the event of aggression.
- To seek the solution of political, judicial, and economic problems that may arise among them.
- To promote, by cooperative action, their economic, social, and cultural development.
- To eradicate extreme poverty, which constitutes an obstacle to the full democratic development of the peoples of the hemisphere.
- To achieve an effective limitation of conventional weapons that will make it possible to devote the largest amount of resources to the economic and social development of the member states.

Over the course of the 1990s, with the end of the Cold War, the return to democracy in Latin America, and the thrust toward globalization, the OAS made major efforts to reinvent itself to fit the new context. Its stated priorities now include the following:

- Strengthening democracy: Between 1962 and 2002, the Organization sent multinational observation missions to oversee free and fair elections in the member states on more than 100 occasions. The OAS also works to strengthen national and local government and electoral agencies, to promote democratic practices and values, and to help countries detect and defuse official corruption.
- Working for peace: Special OAS missions have supported peace processes in Nicaragua, Suriname, Haiti, and Guatemala. The Organization has played a leading part in the removal of landmines deployed in member states and it has led negotiations to resolve the continents' remaining border disputes (Guatemala/Belize; Peru/Ecuador). Work is also underway on the construction of a common inter-American counter-terrorism front.
- Defending human rights: The agencies of the inter-American human rights system provide a venue for the denunciation and resolution of human rights violations in individual cases. They also monitor and report on the general human rights situation in the member states.
- Fostering free trade: The OAS is one of the three agencies currently engaged in drafting a treaty aiming to establish an inter-continental free trade area from Alaska to Tierra del Fuego.
- Fighting the drugs trade: The Inter-American Drug Abuse Control Commission was established in 1986 to coordinate efforts and cross-border cooperation in this area.
- Promoting sustainable development: The goal of the OAS's Inter-American Council for Integral Development is to promote economic development and combating poverty. OAS technical cooperation programs address such areas as river basin management, the conservation of biodiversity, preservation of cultural diversity, planning for global climate change, sustainable tourism, and natural disaster mitigation.

== Organizational structure ==
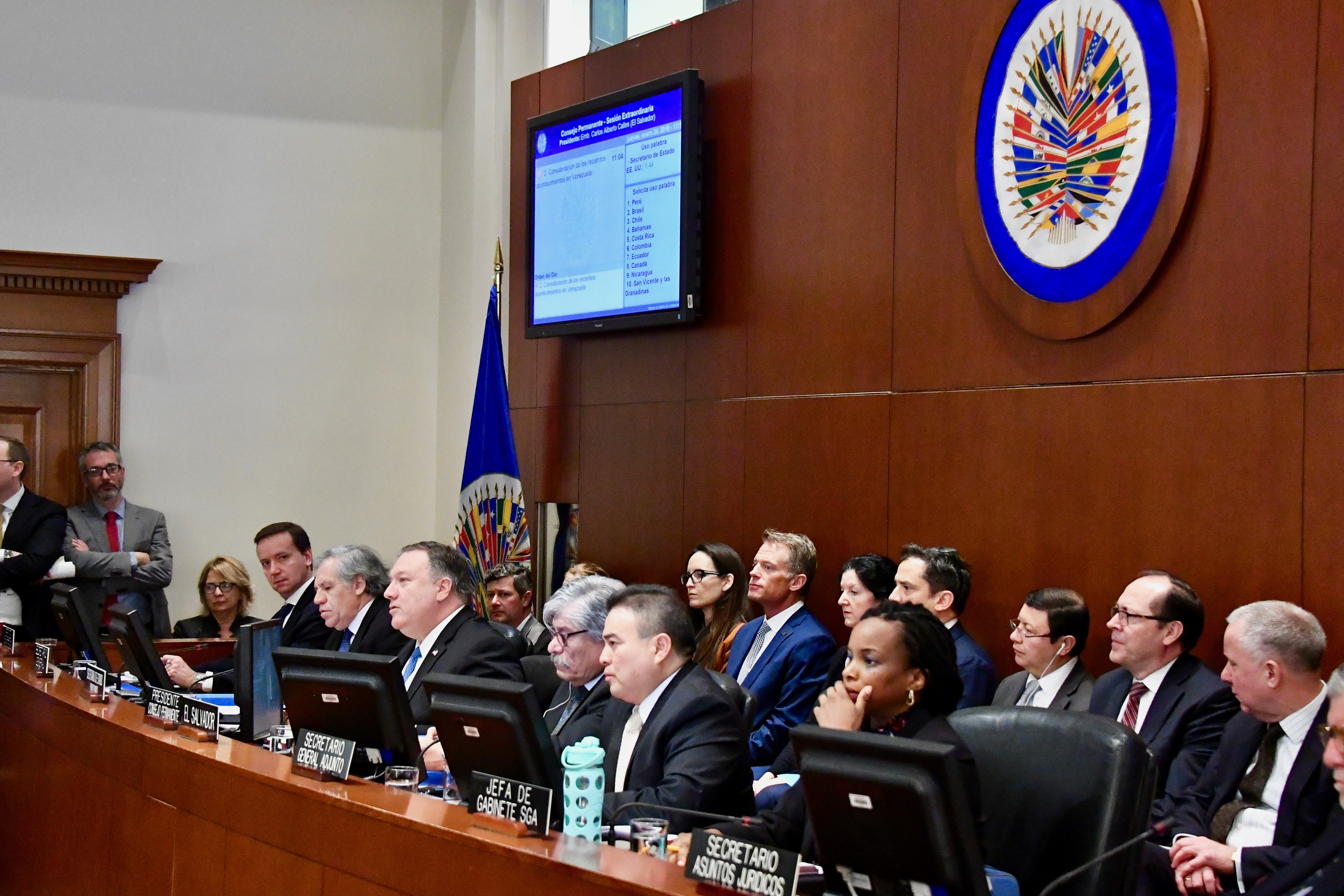
U.S. Secretary of State Mike Pompeo speaks at the OAS Permanent Council in January 2019.

The Organization of American States is composed of a General Secretariat, the Permanent Council, the Inter-American Council for Integral Development, and a number of committees.

The General Secretariat of the Organization of American States consists of six secretariats.

- Secretariat for Political Affairs
- Executive Secretariat for Integral Development
- Secretariat for Multidimensional Security
- Secretariat for Administration and Finance
- Secretariat for Legal Affairs
- Secretariat for External Relations

The various committees of the Organization of American States include:

- The Committee on Juridical and Political Affairs
- The Committee on Administrative and Budgetary Affairs
- The Committee on Hemispheric Security
- The Committee on Inter-American Summits Management and Civil Society Participation in OAS Activities

The various commissions of the Organization of American States include:

- Inter-American Commission of Women (CIM)
- Inter-American Commission on Human Rights (CIDH)
- Inter-American Telecommunication Commission (CITEL)

=== General Assembly ===
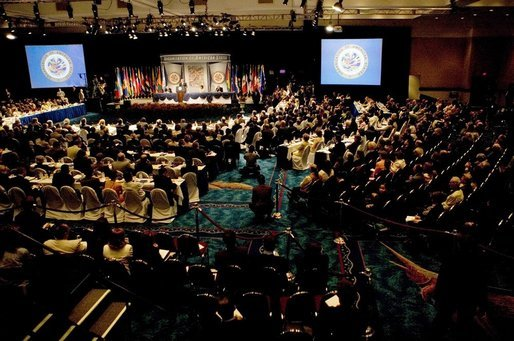
A session of the OAS's 35th General Assembly in Fort Lauderdale, Florida, in June 2005

The General Assembly is the supreme decision-making body of OAS. It convenes once every year in a regular session. In special circumstances, and with the approval of two-thirds of the member states, the Permanent Council can convene special sessions.

The Organization's member states take turns hosting the General Assembly on a rotating basis. The states are represented at its sessions by their chosen delegates: generally, their ministers of foreign affairs, or their appointed deputies. Each state has one vote, and most matters are settled by a majority vote, except for those for which the Charter or the General Assembly's own rules of procedure specifically require a two-thirds majority.

The General Assembly's powers include setting the OAS's general course and policies by means of resolutions and declarations; approving its budget and determining the contributions payable by the member states; approving the reports and previous year's actions of the OAS's specialized agencies; and electing members to serve on those agencies.

=== Specialized agencies ===
The OAS has five specialized agencies:

- Pan American Health Organization (PAHO)
- Inter-American Children's Institute (IIN)
- Inter-American Commission of Women (CIM)
- Pan-American Institute of Geography and History (PAIGH)
- Inter-American Institute for Cooperation on Agriculture (IICA)

=== Official languages ===
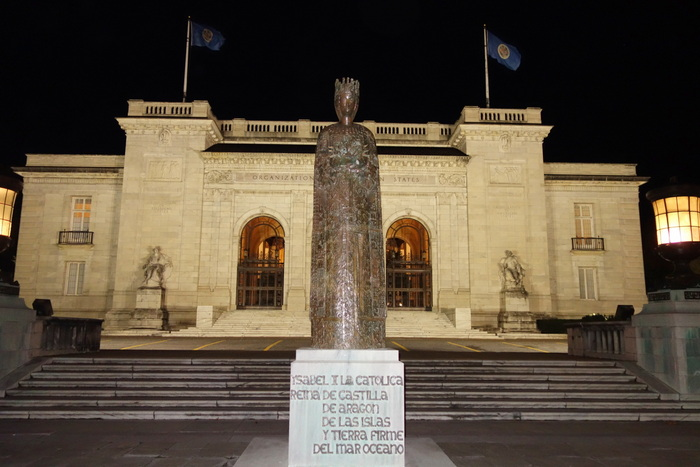
Statue of Isabella I of Castile, the Catholic Queen in front of the seat of the OAS headquarters in Washington, D.C.

The Organization's official languages are Spanish, Portuguese, French, and English. The Charter, the basic instrument governing OAS, makes no reference to the use of official languages. These references are to be found in the Rules of Procedure governing the various OAS bodies. Article 51 of the Rules of Procedure of the General Assembly, the supreme body of the OAS, which meets once a year, states that English, French, Portuguese, and Spanish are the four official languages. Article 28 stipulates that a Style Committee shall be set up with representatives of the four official languages to review the General Assembly resolutions and declarations. Article 53 states that proposals shall be presented in the four official languages. The Rules of Procedure and Statutes of other bodies, such as the Inter-American Council for Integral Development (CIDI), the Permanent Executive Committee of the Inter-American Council for Integral Development (CEPCIDI), the Inter-American Commission of Women (CIM), the Inter-American Drug Abuse Control Commission (CICAD), the Inter-American Commission on Human Rights (IACHR) and the Inter-American Juridical Committee (CJI), technical bodies of the OAS, also mention the four official languages in which their meetings are to be conducted. Policy is therefore dictated through these instruments that require use of the four official languages at meetings.

Although a number of other languages have official status in one or more member states of OAS (Dutch in Suriname; Haitian Creole alongside French in Haiti; Quechua and Aymara in Peru, Ecuador and Bolivia; Guaraní in Paraguay), they are not official languages of the Organization.

=== Funding and accountability ===
The OAS has two funds, one for the General Secretariat, and one for specific programs and initiatives. The General Assembly asks for contributions from each member country based on its capacity to pay. In 2018 the General Secretariat's budget was $85 million of which the US contributed $50 million. In 2017 the US contributed $17 million to the fund for specific programs which was almost a third of the total contributions for that year. As of June 2026 there's no full clear indication the United States would follow through on providing funding of the OAS in FY2027.

==== OAS Office of the Inspector General audits ====
The OAS Office of the Inspector General (OIG) conducts forensic internal performance audits, to assess the General Secretariat in achieving the objectives recommended in administration and operations of the OAS and its safeguarding of resources used to undertake programs across Latin America and the Caribbean. The OIG's internal audit reports are presented to the OAS Audit Committee, and the Secretary General as well as member states of the OAS upon request. The OIG maintains whistleblower provisions to report irregular activity to the OIG for review.

==== Financial audits ====
Under General Assembly Resolution 123, adopted on April 14, 1973 Financial audits of the accounts of the OAS are published annually. The annual reports are presented to the General Secretariat by The Audit Committee (formerly The OAS Board of External Auditors.) The Committee members are composed of three members elected by the OAS's General Assembly.

== Membership and adhesions ==
Upon its foundation in 1948, the OAS had 21 members, most of them in Latin America:

- Argentina
- Bolivia
- Brazil
- Chile
- Colombia
- Costa Rica
- Cuba (Note: Suspended from 1962 to 2009, however the Cuban government has stated it does not intend to resume participation in the organization. See Cuba–OAS relations.)
- Dominican Republic
- Ecuador
- El Salvador
- Guatemala
- Haiti
- Honduras (Note: Suspended between 2009–2011. See Suspension of Honduras below.)
- Mexico
- Nicaragua (Note: On 19 November 2021, Nicaragua announced its intention to withdraw from the OAS. Per the terms of the charter, the process became effective two years following notification, on 19 November 2023. See Status of Nicaragua below.)
- Panama
- Paraguay
- Peru
- United States
- Uruguay
- Venezuela

The later expansion of the OAS included Canada and the newly independent nations of the Caribbean. Members with later admission dates (sorted chronologically):

- Barbados (member since 1967)
- Trinidad and Tobago (1967)
- Jamaica (1969)
- Grenada (1975)
- Suriname (1977)
- Dominica (1979)
- Saint Lucia (1979)
- Antigua and Barbuda (1981)
- Saint Vincent and the Grenadines (1981)
- Bahamas (1982)
- Saint Kitts and Nevis (1984)
- Canada (1990)
- Belize (1991)
- Guyana (1991)

=== Canada and the OAS ===
Although admission into OAS's predecessor, the Pan American Union, was initially restricted to republics, several overtures were still made for Canada to join the organization in 1928, 1933, 1936, and 1938. During the 1936 Pan American Union Conference, the organization extended its membership from only "American republics" to "American states" to accommodate Canada's admission as a constitutional monarchy. However, U.S. opposition to Canadian membership prevented their admittance, with the U.S. fearing the admittance of Canada to the OAS would bring with it British influence that could impede its freedom of action within the organization. The U.S. reversed its position on Canadian membership in 1947. However, by that time, Canadian foreign policy had adopted an Atlanticist position with a European focus; resulting in the Canadian government seeing little value in pursuing OAS membership.

From the 1960s to the 1980s, the Canadian government expressed some interest in joining the OAS, having successfully applied for permanent observer status in 1972 to evaluate potential membership. In the 1980s, the Canadian government incrementally increased its participation in OAS activities. Canada signed the Charter of the Organization of American States in 1989. Canada's membership in the OAS was formalized when the decision was ratified in 1990.

=== Sanctions against the Dominican Republic during Trujillo regime ===
During the 6th Conference of Foreign Ministers of the Organization of American States (OAS) in Costa Rica, from 16 to 20 August 1960, a conviction against the State of the Dominican Republic was agreed to unanimously. The penalty was motivated because the foreign ministers checked the veracity of the claim that the Rafael Trujillo regime had sponsored an attack against Rómulo Betancourt, at that time the constitutional president of Venezuela. The meeting was attended by foreign ministers from 21 American nations, including Cuba, which at that time had not yet been expelled from the inter-American system.

All countries, including the United States and Haiti, broke off diplomatic relations with the Dominican Republic. Additionally an economic blockade that affected the exports of sugar was applied, which at that time was the pillar of the Dominican economy.

It was the first application of the Inter-American Treaty of Reciprocal Assistance, which had been adopted at the OAS on 29 July 1960.

=== Permanent observers ===
As of 31 January 2014, there are 69 permanent observer countries including the four countries with territory or territories in the Americas—Denmark, France, the Netherlands, and the United Kingdom; as well as the European Union and India.

In March 2022, the OAS voted to suspend Russia as a permanent observer due to the Russian invasion of Ukraine.

== Suspensions, withdrawals and termination ==
=== Cuba ===
The current government of Cuba was excluded from participation in the Organization under a decision adopted by the Eighth Meeting of Consultation in Punta del Este, Uruguay, on 31 January 1962. The vote was passed by 14 in favor, with one against (Cuba) and six abstentions (Argentina, Bolivia, Brazil, Chile, Ecuador, and Mexico). The operative part of the resolution reads as follows:

1. That adherence by any member of the Organization of American States to Marxism-Leninism is incompatible with the inter-American system and the alignment of such a government with the communist bloc breaks the unity and solidarity of the hemisphere.
2. That the present Government of Cuba, which has officially identified itself as a Marxist-Leninist government, is incompatible with the principles and objectives of the inter-American system.
3. That this incompatibility excludes the present Government of Cuba from participation in the inter-American system.

This meant that the Cuban nation was still technically a member state, but that the current government was denied the right of representation and attendance at meetings and of participation in activities. The OAS's position was that although Cuba's participation was suspended, its obligations under the Charter, the American Declaration of the Rights and Duties of Man, etc. still hold: for instance, the Inter-American Commission on Human Rights continues to publish reports on Cuba's human rights situation and to hear individual cases involving Cuban nationals. However, this stance was occasionally questioned by other individual member states.

The resolution to exclude Cuba was controversial when it was adopted, and the reintegration of Cuba into the Inter-American system has remained a frequent source of contention among the countries of the hemisphere ever since. Cuba's position was stated in an official note sent to the Organization "merely as a courtesy" by Minister of Foreign Affairs Raúl Roa on 4 November 1964: "Cuba was arbitrarily excluded ... The Organization of American States has no juridical, factual, or moral jurisdiction, nor competence, over a state which it has illegally deprived of its rights." The reincorporation of Cuba as an active member regularly arose as a topic within the inter-American system – for instance, it was intimated by the outgoing ambassador of Mexico in 1998 – but most observers did not see it as a serious possibility while the present government remained in power. Since 1960, the Cuban administration had repeatedly characterized the OAS as the "Ministry of Colonies" of the United States of America. Fidel Castro and his brother Raúl attacked the OAS as a "Yankee bordello" and "instrument of imperialist domination" and vowed that Cuba would never join, although OAS rescinded the nation's expulsion in 2009 and invited it to apply for readmission. Venezuelan President Hugo Chávez promised to veto any final declaration of the 2009 Summit of the Americas due to Cuba's exclusion.

On 17 April 2009, after a "trading of warm words" between the administrations of U.S. President Barack Obama and Cuban leader Raúl Castro, OAS Secretary General José Miguel Insulza said he would ask the 2009 General Assembly to annul the 1962 resolution excluding Cuba.

On 3 June 2009, foreign ministers assembled in San Pedro Sula, Honduras, for the OAS's 39th General Assembly, passed a vote to lift Cuba's suspension from the OAS. The United States had been pressuring the OAS for weeks to condition Cuba's readmission to the group on democratic principles and commitment to human rights. Ecuador's Foreign Minister Fander Falconí said there will be no such conditions. "This is a new proposal, it has no conditions—of any kind", Falconí said. "That suspension was made in the Cold War, in the language of the Cold War. What we have done here is fix a historic error." The suspension was lifted at the end of the General Assembly, but, to be readmitted to the Organization, Cuba will need to comply with all the treaties signed by the Member States, including the Inter-American Democratic Charter of 2001. A statement issued by the Cuban government on 8 June 2009 said that while Cuba welcomed the Assembly's gesture, in light of the Organization's historical record, "Cuba will not return to the OAS".

=== Suspension of Honduras (2009–2011) ===
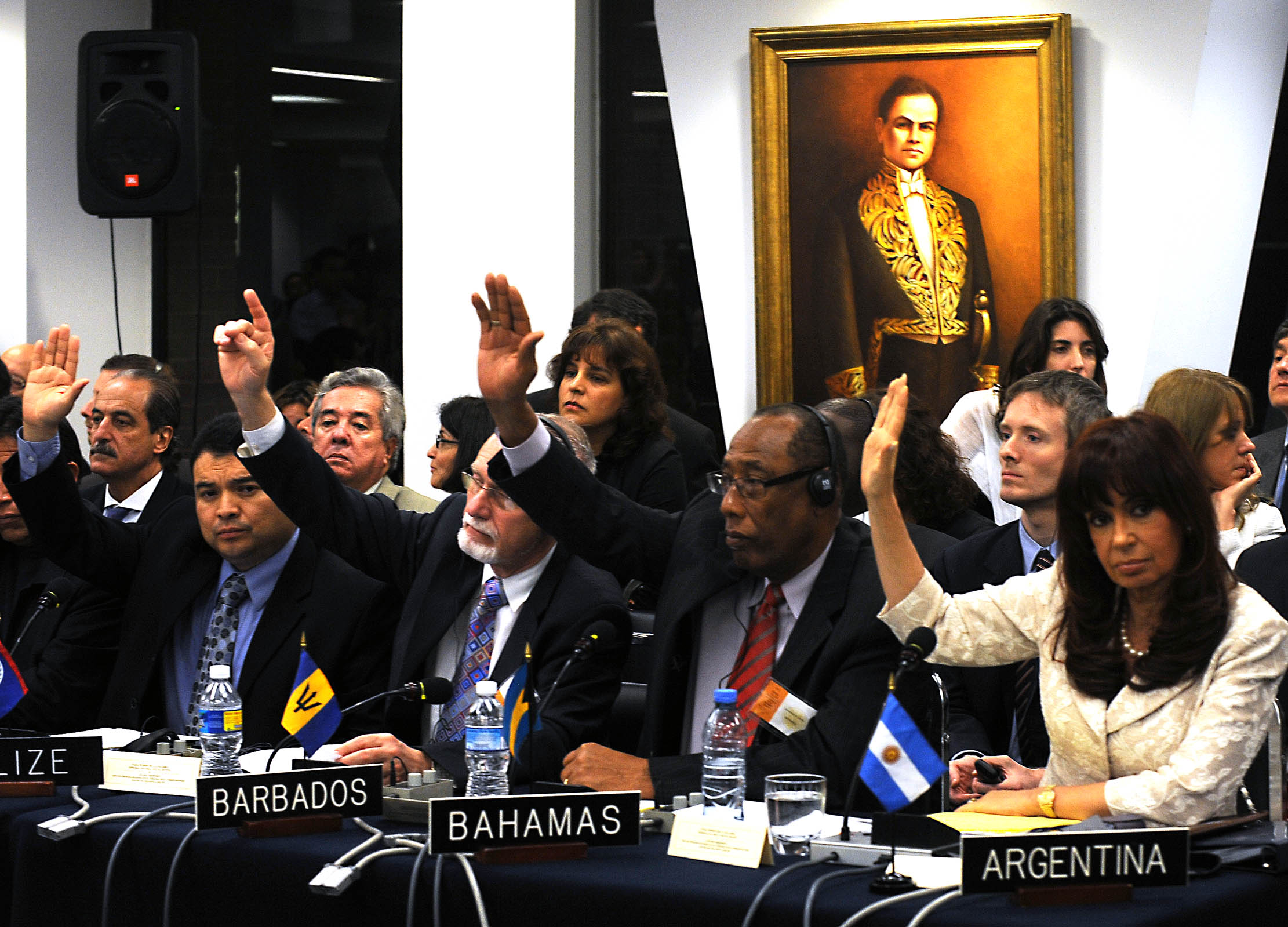
The OAS's Extraordinary Assembly voted to suspend Honduras on 5 July 2009, during the 2009 Honduran constitutional crisis.

Following the expulsion of its President Manuel Zelaya, Honduras' membership of the Organization was suspended unanimously at midnight on 5 July 2009. The de facto government had already announced it was leaving the OAS hours earlier; this was not, however, taken into account by the OAS, which did not recognize that government as legitimate. An extraordinary meeting had been conducted by the OAS in Washington, D.C., with Zelaya in attendance. The suspension of Honduras was approved unanimously with 33 votes (Honduras did not vote). This was the first suspension carried out by the OAS since that of Cuba in 1962.

After Zelaya's return to Honduras in 2011, the country was re-admitted to the Organization on 1 June 2011 with 32 votes in favor and 1 (Ecuador) against. Venezuela expressed some reservations.

=== Nicaragua ===
On 7 November 2021, Nicaragua held a general election which saw President Daniel Ortega re-elected to a fourth term in office. In a vote by the OAS Permanent Council, 25 member states voted in favour of a resolution condemning the election. Seven countries, including Mexico, Honduras and Bolivia, abstained. The motion stated that the election was "not free, fair or transparent and lack[s] democratic legitimacy" and also instructed the Permanent Council to undertake an assessment of the situation and "take appropriate action".

In response to this statement, Nicaraguan Foreign Minister Denis Moncada announced on 19 November that Nicaragua would leave the OAS. Moncada called the bloc "an instrument of interference and intervention" and accused it of "facilitating the hegemony of the United States with its interventionism over the countries of Latin America and the Caribbean." According to Article 143 of the OAS Charter, the process to withdraw from the organization takes two years after its announcement.

In April 2022, Nicaragua announced that it had completed its withdrawal from the OAS. It said the OAS offices in Managua had been closed. The OAS stated that, due to the terms of treaty, the withdrawal would not take effect until 2023. Nicaragua eventually completed its withdrawal from the OAS on 19 November that year.

=== Venezuela ===
On 28 April 2017, Venezuela notified the OAS of its denunciation of the Charter of the OAS, which as per Article 143 would lead to the withdrawal of Venezuela from the OAS effective two years from the date of notification. During this period, the country did not plan on participating in the OAS.

During the 2019 Venezuelan presidential crisis, the President of the National Assembly of Venezuela Juan Guaidó, who was recognized by the National Assembly as the acting president, sent a letter to the OAS Secretary General annulling the previous denunciation of the OAS Charter, and expressing his desire for Venezuela to remain a member of the OAS. The National Assembly designated a special envoy as representative to the OAS, lawyer Gustavo Tarre Briceño, who the OAS voted to recognize as Venezuela's delegate in April. In October 2022, a bloc of leftist OAS member states led a motion to remove Tarre's representation in the organization. Out of 35 members, 19 nations voted in favor of the motion and 4 against. The motion fell short of the 24 votes required for a two-thirds majority.

The interim government of Guaidó was later dissolved in 2022, with the chavista state being the only government structure remaining.

== See also ==
- OAS Official Website
- African Union
- Council of Europe
- Intergovernmental organization
- International law
- Regional organization
- Regional integration
- Community of Latin American and Caribbean States
- Flag of the Organization of American States
- Organization of Ibero-American States
- Rio Group
- Rio Pact
- Statues of the Liberators
- Union of South American Nations
