= Permanent Council of the Organization of American States =

Organization

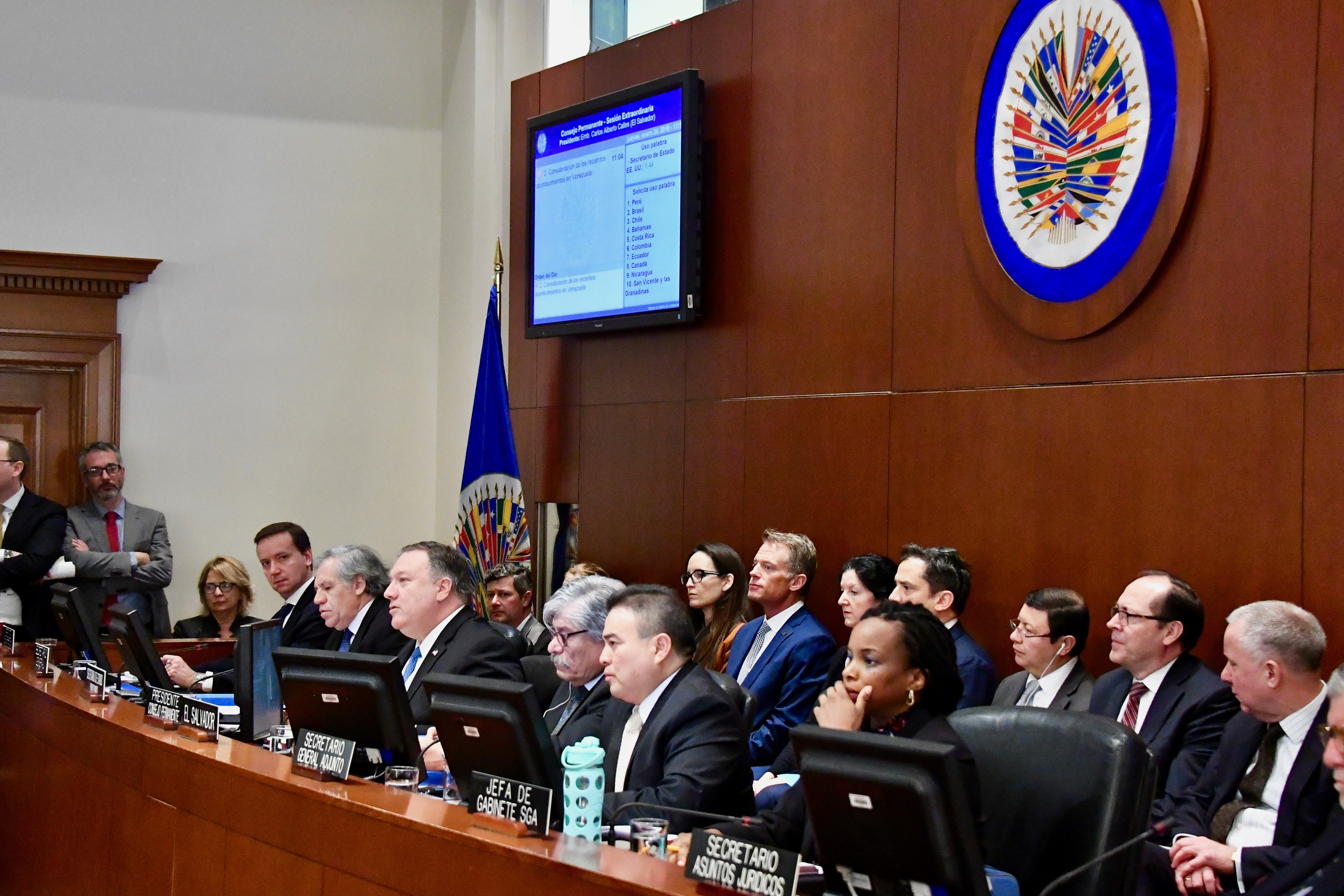
US Secretary of State Mike Pompeo speaks at the OAS Permanent Council in January 2019

The Permanent Council is one of the two main political bodies of the Organization of American States, the other being the General Assembly.

The Permanent Council is established under Chapter XII of the OAS Charter. It is composed of ambassadors appointed by the member states (one per state), and it meets regularly at OAS headquarters in Washington, D.C., United States. The chair of the Council rotates among these permanent representatives of the member states, with each country chairing the Council for a three-month period.

Together, the General Assembly and the Permanent Council set broad priorities for the OAS; because it meets more regularly, however, the Council has immediate responsibility for directing the Organization's ongoing actions.

== Sources ==
Parts of the first version of this article were adapted from Organization of American States: A Primer, a public domain publication of the U.S. government.
