= Constitutional coup =

Coup d'état consistent with a constitution

A constitutional coup occurs when a person or group seizes political power in a way consistent with their country's constitution, as opposed to a traditional violent coup d'état, often by exploiting loopholes or ambiguities in the said constitution. Supporters of constitutional coups exploit their political power to semi-legally seize more. Constitutional coups can be carried out in many ways, including removing term or age limits, changing electoral rules to hinder opposing candidates, and postponing elections indefinitely.

Constitutional coups are often facilitated by weak democratic institutions and an absence of "democratic culture" within countries. Struggles between rival factions, particularly between ethnocultural or religious groups, are a common facilitator of constitutional coups. Constitutional coups often involve willing and participatory parliaments and changes to term limits are often accompanied by other constitutional changes which are meant to weaken political opposition and ensure election victories. These coups are considered a relatively recent occurrence in global democracies.

== Examples ==
=== In Africa ===
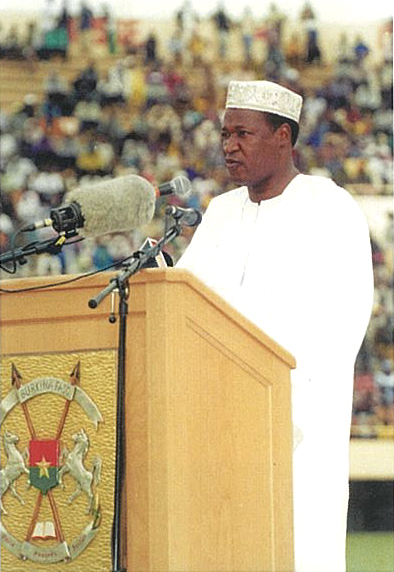
Blaise Compaoré in public

In Africa, constitutional coups typically entail the expansion of executive power through the extension or elimination of constitutional term limits. Another common strategy is for an incumbent to invalidate the candidacy of their opponent, making themselves the de facto winner. As many as 30 African heads of state have attempted to extend their mandates through constitutional changes since the early 1990s, when many African countries began democratizing.

African heads of state have developed a preference for constitutional coups over military coups, in part, because they are less likely to anger foreign aid partners. In addition, there are greater safeguards against traditional coups, incentivizing political leaders to hold on to power through constitutional coups instead. For example, the African Union and its predecessor, the Organization of African Unity, have developed effective policies to deal with military coups, but have so far been ineffective at discouraging constitutional coups. Documents published by the AU/OAU to create a framework for intervention after coups, including the Lomé Declaration, the African Charter on Democracy, Elections and Government, and the Constitutive Act of African Union, only consider unconstitutional regime change, not constitutional coups.

Many African Presidents have changed their country's constitutions to extend their term-limits. These include Presidents Gnassingbé (Togo), Museveni (Uganda), Déby (Chad), Biya (Cameroon), Kagame (Rwanda), Nkurunziza (Burundi), and el-Sisi (Egypt). African countries (and their presidents) that have successfully undertaken constitutional coups include; Algeria (Abdelaziz Bouteflika), Burundi (Pierre Nkurunziza), Cameroon (Paul Biya), Central African Republic (Faustin-Archange Touadéra), Chad (Idriss Déby), Congo Republic (Denis Sassou Nguesso), Comoros (Azali Assoumani), Democratic Republic of Congo (Joseph Kabila), Côte d'Ivoire (Alassane Ouattara), Djibouti (Ismaïl Omar Guelleh), Egypt (Abdel Fattah El-Sisi), Gabon (Omar Bongo), Guinea (Lansana Conté), Rwanda (Paul Kagame), South Sudan (Salva Kiir), Togo (Gnassingbé Eyadema Faure Gnassingbé), Tunisia (Zine el-Abidine Ben Ali), Tunisia (Kais Saied), Uganda (Yoweri Museveni).

In 2005, the president of Burkina Faso, Blaise Compaoré, exploited a quirk of the 1991 constitution to stay in power after he had exceeded the term limits. Compaoré argued that, because he was elected to office before term limits were first instituted in 2000, they did not apply to him. The Constitutional Council of Burkina Faso, which was controlled by Compoaré and his political party, the Congress for Democracy and Progress, ruled in his favor. Compaoré then ran for and won a third term in office.

=== Pakistan, 1953 ===
Governor-General Ghulam Mohammad dismissed Pakistani Prime Minister Khawaja Nazimuddin's government in 1953 despite the Prime Minister enjoying the support of the Constituent Assembly and, subsequently, dismissed Pakistan's first constituent assembly in 1954.

=== Finland, 1973 ===
In 1973, the Finnish Parliament extended Urho Kekkonen's presidential term by four years with a derogation law.

=== Australia, 1975 ===
On 11 November 1975, then Prime Minister of Australia Gough Whitlam was dismissed by governor-general John Kerr in an event known as the Dismissal. The Dismissal has been characterised as a "constitutional coup" or "soft coup". The Central Intelligence Agency (CIA) has been implicated with the Dismissal; there have been claims that the CIA funded Kerr and directed him to invoke his reserve powers, due to opposition to Whitlam's policies. Paul Keating, who was a minister within the Whitlam government and later served as prime minister, described the Dismissal as a "coup" and has called for Kerr to be arrested. However, the characterisation of the crisis as a "coup", as well as CIA involvement allegations, have been contested.

=== Malaysia, 1976 ===
On April 15, the Bersatu Rakyat Jelata Sabah (Berjaya – Sabah People's United Front) was victorious in the state elections over the ruling Sabah Alliance party by persuading dissent members of the Sabah Alliance party to abandon their leader, Tun Mustapha bin Datu Harun.

=== Tunisia, 1987 ===
On November 7, the Prime Minister of Tunisia, Zine el-Abidine Ben Ali, deposed the president for life, Habib Bourguiba, and assumed the position of chief executive.

=== United States, 2000 ===
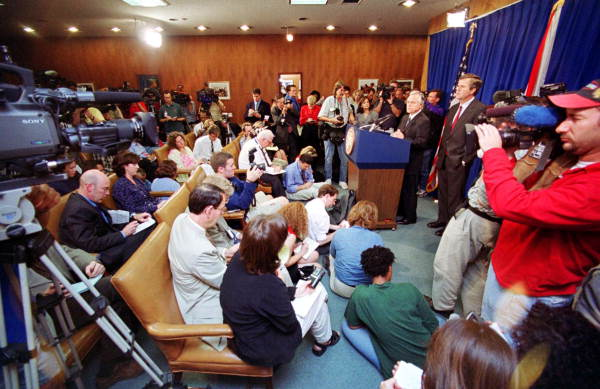
Attorney General Bob Butterworth (left) speaking at a news conference with Governor Jeb Bush (right) on the initial Florida recount during the 2000 Presidential election

During the United States presidential election recount in Florida, then-governor Jeb Bush called on the state legislature to simply ignore the contested vote count and give Florida's electoral college votes to candidate George Bush, a fellow Republican and Jeb Bush's brother. This is theoretically constitutional, as the US constitution does not guarantee the right to vote in presidential elections. Rather, it authorizes each state to determine how its electors should be chosen, although it is ambiguous whether, having already selected electors by vote in accordance with state law, the legislature can then overrule that determination. However, the move was ultimately blocked by the US Supreme Court.

=== Nepal, 2020 ===
Khadha Prasad Sharma Oli, Prime Minister of Nepal, had attempted to dissolve the Nepalese parliament. The dissolution was being challenged under three different petitions in the Supreme Court, and it was contested whether or not the Prime Minister actually has the power to dissolve parliament. K P Oli attempted the power grab during a legitimacy crisis, as rival factions seek his resignation due to poor governance and authoritarian impulses.

=== United States, 2020 ===
Following his loss in 2020 United States presidential election, President Donald Trump repeatedly made false claims that widespread electoral fraud had occurred and that only he had legitimately won the election. Although most resulting lawsuits were either dismissed or ruled against by numerous courts, Trump nonetheless conspired with his campaign team to submit documents in several states (all of which had been won by Joe Biden) which falsely claimed to be legitimate electoral certificates for President Trump and Vice President Mike Pence. After the submission of these documents, the Trump campaign intended that the presiding officer of the United States Senate, either President of the Senate Pence or President pro tempore Chuck Grassley, would claim to have the unilateral power to reject electors during the January 6, 2021 vote counting session; the presiding officer would reject all electors from the several states in which the Trump campaign had submitted false documents, leaving 232 votes for Trump and 222 votes for Biden, thereby overturning the election results in favour of Trump. The plans for January 6 failed to come to fruition after Pence refused to follow the campaign's proposals.

Central in the efforts to overturn the election were a series of memos written by lawyers John Eastman and Kenneth Chesebro, who were both cooperating with the campaign, which have been described by some as a road map for a constitutional coup. It was argued that the Twelfth Amendment of the United States Constitution granted the President of the Senate complete unilateral authority over the counting of electoral votes on January 6, thereby allowing him to reject any and all electors or electoral votes which he deems illegitimate. Eastman argued that Vice President Pence, who served as President of the Senate, had the power to "send the electors home" and nullify the count. With the certification of the election delayed, the alleged evidence of widespread electoral fraud would then be investigated and discovered, and the slates of Trump-Pence electors would be approved to certify the president's victory. The fringe interpretations of the constitution offered by Eastman and Chesebro have been contested by numerous legal scholars. (Note: Attributed to multiple sources:)
