= African Charter on Democracy, Elections and Governance =

International treaty

The African Charter on Democracy, Elections and Governance (ADC) is a document adopted by member states of the African Union (AU) on January 30, 2007, in order to promote liberal democracy and human rights in Africa. It is the first binding document adopted by members of the African Union. Among its provisions are several aimed at combating unconstitutional regime changes, including the first legal instrument adopted by the AU acknowledging that constitutional coups are a form of unconstitutional regime change.

Cameroon and Burkina Faso, two semi-authoritarian countries, have ratified the ADC, indicating that adoption of the charter on its own is not enough to prevent authoritarianism in Africa.

== Background ==
The supranational organization which preceded the AU, the Organization of African Unity, had a similar accord called the Declaration on the Framework for OAU Response to Unconstitutional Changes in Government, or the "Lomé Declaration" for short. Under the Lomé Declaration, the OAU was equipped with an official framework to deal with unconstitutional changes of government in Africa. However, the Declaration was largely ineffective for a number of reasons, including that the Lomé Declaration was not legally binding, it failed to create a framework for democratizing authoritarian countries, it defined unconstitutional changes narrowly, excluding constitutional coups, and it failed to create sufficient enforcement mechanisms. The ADC would later attempt to address some of these problems by making the charter binding and including constitutional coups in its mandate, for example.

The ADC was also preceded by a number of AU instruments which had similar goals of promoting democracy, protecting human rights, and preventing unconstitutional regime changes. Among these are the Constitutive Act of the AU, the African Charter on Human and Peoples' Rights, the Declaration on the Principles Governing Democratic Elections in Africa, and the AU Convention on Preventing and Combating Corruption.

== Adoption by member states ==
Adopted in 2007, the charter only came into effect on February 15, 2012. Signature and ratification by member states, however, has been a slow and continual process since the charter's inception. Many of the more authoritarian member states of the African Union were unwilling to ratify the ADC because of its expansive provisions designed to encourage liberal democracy. By 2009, 29 of 55 member states had signed the ADC, and only three had ratified it.

In order for a member state to adopt the charter, the head of state must sign the charter during an AU meeting, at which point it may be ratified. However, the ratification process is often prohibitively complicated, especially in states which lack the political will to adopt the charter in the first place. Ratification typically requires significant input from all key government and non-governmental stakeholders and often involves making preemptive costly adjustments to national institutions to be in accordance with the principles of the charter.

Of the 55 member states that make up the African Union, 46 have signed, 34 have ratified, and 34 have deposited.

Dates of Signature, Ratification/Accession, and Deposit as of 2019
Country	Date of Signature	Date of Ratification	Date of Deposit
Algeria	14/07/2012	20/11/2017	10/01/2017
Angola	27/01/2021	-	-
Benin	16/07/2007	28/06/2012	11/07/2012
Botswana	-	-	-
Burkina Faso	02/08/2007	26/05/2010	06/07/2010
Burundi	20/06/2007	-	-
Cameroon	-	24/08/2011	16/01/2012
Central African Republic	28/06/2008	24/04/2017	06/03/2019
Cape Verde	27/01/2012	-	-
Chad	22/01/2009	11/07/2011	13/10/2011
Côte d'Ivoire	11/06/2009	16/10/2013	28/11/2013
Comoros	02/02/2010	30/11/2016	06/01/2017
Congo	18/06/2007	-	-
Djibouti	15/06/2007	02/12/2012	22/01/2013
Democratic Republic of Congo	29/06/2008	-	-
Egypt	-	-	-
Equatorial Guinea	30/01/2011	-	-
Eritrea	-	-	-
Ethiopia	28/12/2007	05/12/2008	06/01/2009
Gabon	02/02/2010	-	-
Gambia	29/01/2008	11/06/2018	04/02/2019
Ghana	15/01/2008	06/09/2010	19/10/2010
Guinea-Bissau	17/06/2008	23/12/2011	04/01/2012
Guinea	09/05/2007	17/06/2011	11/07/2011
Kenya	28/06/2008	-	-
Libya	-	-	-
Lesotho	17/03/2010	30/06/2010	09/07/2010
Liberia	18/06/2008	23/02/2014	07/03/2017
Madagascar	31/01/2014	23/02/2017	13/04/2017
Mali	29/06/2007	13/08/2013	02/09/2013
Malawi	-	11/10/2012	24/10/2012
Morocco	-	-	-
Mozambique	27/05/2010	24/04/2018	09/05/2018
Mauritania	29/01/2008	07/07/2008	28/07/2008
Mauritius	14/12/2007	-	-
Namibia	10/05/2007	23/08/2016	30/08/2016
Nigeria	02/07/2007	01/12/2011	09/01/2012
Niger	17/06/2008	04/10/2011	08/11/2011
Rwanda	29/06/2007	09/07/2010	14/07/2010
South Africa	01/02/2010	24/12/2010	24/01/2011
Sahrawi Arab Democratic Republic	25/07/2010	27/11/2013	27/01/2014
Senegal	15/12/2008	-	-
Seychelles	-	12/08/2016	28/09/2016
Sierra Leone	17/06/2008	17/02/2009	08/12/2009
South Sudan	24/01/2013	26/01/2014	13/04/2015
São Tomé and Príncipe	01/02/2010	18/04/2019	27/06/2019
Sudan	30/06/2008	19/06/2013	16/09/2013
Eswatini	29/01/2008	-	-
Tanzania	-	-	-
Togo	30/10/2007	24/01/2012	20/03/2012
Tunisia	27/01/2013	-	-
Uganda	16/12/2008	-	-
Zambia	31/01/2010	31/05/2011	08/07/2011
Zimbabwe	21/03/2018	-	-

== See also ==
- Inter-American Democratic Charter
- Ushuaia Protocol
