= American Convention on Human Rights =

1969 international human rights instrument

Pact of San José
American Convention on Human Rights
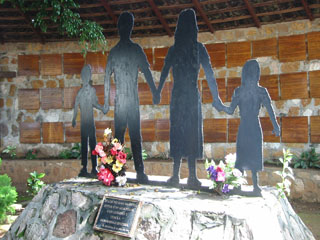
- Signed: 22 November 1969
- Location: San José, Costa Rica
- Effective: 18 July 1978
- Condition: 11 ratifications
- Parties: 24; 23 (from September 2013)
- Depositary: General Secretariat of the Organization of American States

Full text
- American Convention on Human Rights at Wikisource

The American Convention on Human Rights (ACHR), also known as the Pact of San José or by its Spanish name used in most of the signatory nations, Convención Americana sobre Derechos Humanos, is an international human rights instrument. It was adopted by many countries in the Americas in San José, Costa Rica, on 22 November 1969. It came into force after the eleventh instrument of ratification (that of Grenada) was deposited on 18 July 1978.

The bodies responsible for overseeing compliance with the Convention are the Inter-American Commission on Human Rights and the Inter-American Court of Human Rights, both of which are organs of the Organization of American States (OAS).

== Content and purpose ==
According to its preamble, the purpose of the Convention is "to consolidate in this hemisphere, within the framework of democratic institutions, a system of personal liberty and social justice based on respect for the essential rights of man".

Chapter I establishes the general obligation of the states parties to uphold the rights set forth in the Convention to all persons under their jurisdiction, and to adapt their domestic laws to bring them into line with the Convention. The 23 articles of Chapter II give a list of individual civil and political rights due to all persons, including the right to life "in general, from the moment of conception", to humane treatment, to a fair trial, to privacy, to freedom of conscience, freedom of assembly, freedom of movement, etc. Article 13 prohibits "any propaganda for war and any advocacy of national, racial, or religious hatred that constitute incitement to lawless violence or to any other similar action against any person on any grounds including those of race, color, religion, language, or national origin" to be considered as offence punishable by law. This provision is established under influence of Article 20 of the International Covenant of Civil and Political Rights. The single article in Chapter III deals with economic, social, and cultural rights. The somewhat cursory treatment given to this issue here was expanded some ten years later with the Protocol of San Salvador (see below).

Chapter IV describes those circumstances in which certain rights can be temporarily suspended, such as during states of emergency, and the formalities to be followed for such suspension to be valid. However, it does not authorize any suspension of Article 3 (right to juridical personality), Article 4 (right to life), Article 5 (right to humane treatment), Article 6 (freedom from slavery), Article 9 (freedom from ex post facto laws), Article 12 (freedom of conscience and religion), Article 17 (right to family), Article 18 (right to the name), Article 19 (rights of the child), Article 20 (right to nationality), Article 22 (right of asylum and non-refoulement) or Article 23 (right to participate in government).

Chapter V, with a nod to the balance between rights and duties enshrined in the earlier American Declaration of the Rights and Duties of Man, points out that individuals have responsibilities as well as rights.

Chapters VI, VII, VIII, and IX contain provisions for the creation and operation of the two bodies responsible for overseeing compliance with the Convention: the Inter-American Commission, based in Washington, D.C., United States, and the Inter-American Court, headquartered in San José, Costa Rica.

Chapter X deals with mechanisms for ratifying the Convention, amending it or placing reservations in it, or denouncing it. Various transitory provisions are set forth in Chapter XI.

In the ensuing years, the states parties to the American Convention have supplemented its provisions with two additional protocols.

The first, the Additional Protocol to the American Convention on Human Rights in the area of Economic, Social, and Cultural Rights (more commonly known as the "Protocol of San Salvador"), was opened for signature in the city of San Salvador, El Salvador, on 17 November 1988. It represented an attempt to take the inter-American human rights system to a higher level by enshrining its protection of so-called second-generation rights in the economic, social, and cultural spheres. The protocol's provisions cover such areas as the right to work, the right to health, the right to food, and the right to education. It came into effect on 16 November 1999 and has been ratified by 16 nations (see below).

The second, the Protocol to the American Convention on Human Rights to Abolish the Death Penalty, was adopted at Asunción, Paraguay, on 8 June 1990. While Article 4 of the American Convention had already placed severe restrictions on the states' ability to impose the death penalty – only applicable for the most serious crimes; no reinstatement once abolished; not to be used for political offenses or common crimes; not to be used against those aged under 18 or over 70, or against pregnant women – signing this protocol formalizes a state's solemn commitment to refrain from using capital punishment in any peacetime circumstance. To date it has been ratified by 13 nations (see below).

=== Inter-American Court's Interpretation ===
The Inter-American Court makes a broad interpretation of the American Convention. It interprets it according to the pro homine principle, in an evolutive fashion and making use of other treaties and soft law. The result is that, in practice, the Inter-American Court modifies the content of the American Convention.

== Ratifications ==
Ratified ACHR only Ratified ACHR and 1st Protocol Ratified ACHR and 2nd Protocol Ratified ACHR and both Protocols Denounced the ACHR

As of 2020, 25 of the 35 OAS's member states have ratified the Convention, while two have denounced it subsequently, and one of the two ratified it repeatedly, leaving 24 active parties:

Country	Ratification date	1st additional protocol	Additional Protocol on the Death Penalty	Denunciation
Argentina	14 August 1984	30 June 2003	18 June 2008	
Barbados	5 December 1981			
Bolivia	20 June 1979	12 July 2006		
Brazil	9 July 1992	8 August 1996	31 July 1996	
Chile	8 August 1990		4 August 2008	
Colombia	28 May 1973	10 October 1997		
Costa Rica	2 March 1970	9 September 1999	30 March 1998	
Dominica	3 June 1993			
Dominican Republic	21 January 1978		27 January 2011	
Ecuador	8 December 1997	2 February 1993	5 February 1998	
El Salvador	20 June 1978	4 May 1995		
Grenada	14 July 1978			
Guatemala	27 April 1978	30 May 2000		
Haiti	14 September 1977			
Honduras	5 September 1977	14 September 2011	10 November 2011	
Jamaica	19 July 1978			
Mexico	2 March 1981	8 March 1996	28 June 2007	
Nicaragua	25 September 1979	15 December 2009	24 March 1999	
Panama	8 May 1978	28 October 1992	27 June 1991	
Paraguay	18 August 1989	28 May 1997	31 October 2000	
Peru	12 July 1978	17 May 1995		
Suriname	12 December 1987	28 February 1990		
Trinidad and Tobago	4 April 1991			26 May 1998
Uruguay	26 March 1985	21 December 1995	8 February 1994	
Venezuela	23 June 1977, 31 July 2019		24 August 1992	10 September 2012

=== Canada ===
The treaty is open to all OAS member states, although to date it has not been ratified by Canada or several of the English-speaking Caribbean nations. The United States signed it in 1977, but has not proceeded with ratification, with the last hearing held in the U.S. Senate on November 19, 1979.

Canada did at one point seriously consider ratification, but has decided against it, despite being, in principle, in favour of such a treaty. The ACHR, having been largely drafted by the predominantly Roman Catholic nations of Latin America, contains anti-abortion provisions, specifically, Article 4.1:

Every person has the right to have his life respected. This right shall be protected by law and, in general, from the moment of conception. No one shall be arbitrarily deprived of his life.

This conflicts with the current legality of abortions in Canada. Although Canada could ratify the convention with a reservation with respect to abortion (as did Mexico), that would contradict Canada's stated opposition to the making of reservations to human rights treaties. Another solution would be for the other states to remove the anti-abortion provisions, but that is unlikely to occur due to strong opposition to abortion in those countries.

== Denunciation framework ==
Section 78 of the treaty signifies that parliaments have agreed to a five-year prohibition of denunciation/withdrawal; within the first five years following entry-of-force of the treaty should they seek to denunciate from the treaty.

Pursuant to article 78 of the American Convention on Human Rights: The States Parties may denounce this Convention at the expiration of the five-year period from the date of its entry into force and by means of notice given one year in advance.

The legal entrustment of the treaty also stipulates under the previous section that any attempts at denunciation must be addressed to the Secretary General of the OAS who shall notify other OAS member states, at which time the member state's Parliament must then await a one-year mandatory sunset period of legal obligation still under the treaty.

Notice of the denunciation shall be addressed to the Secretary General of the Organization, who shall inform the other States Parties.

Further, that article prohibits under the section 78 any ability to relinquish claims of human rights violations for any period prior to that one year sunset time-frame.

Such a denunciation shall not have the effect of releasing the State Party concerned from the obligations contained in this Convention with respect to any act that may constitute violation of those obligations and that has been taken by that state prior to the effective date of denunciation.

=== Denunciation movements ===
Trinidad and Tobago denounced the Convention on 26 May 1998 (effective 26 May 1999) over the death penalty issue. Venezuela denounced the Convention on 10 September 2012 accusing the Inter-American Court and Commission to undermine its Government's stability by interfering with its domestic affairs. Necessary reforms of the institution were blocked. Therefore, it would henceforth increase its cooperation with the United Nations Human Rights Council. Denunciations, according to Article 78 of the ACHR, become effective one year after having been declared. They do not release the state party from its obligations resulting from acts that have occurred before the effective date of denunciation. In 2019, Venezuela (Juan Guaidó) re-ratified the convention. As a result, the Inter-American Court has established that Venezuela remains bound by the Convention.

== See also ==
- Human rights
  - Fetal rights
  - Women's rights
  - International human rights law
- American Declaration of the Rights and Duties of Man
- International Commission against the Death Penalty (ICDP)
