= General Assembly of the Organization of American States =

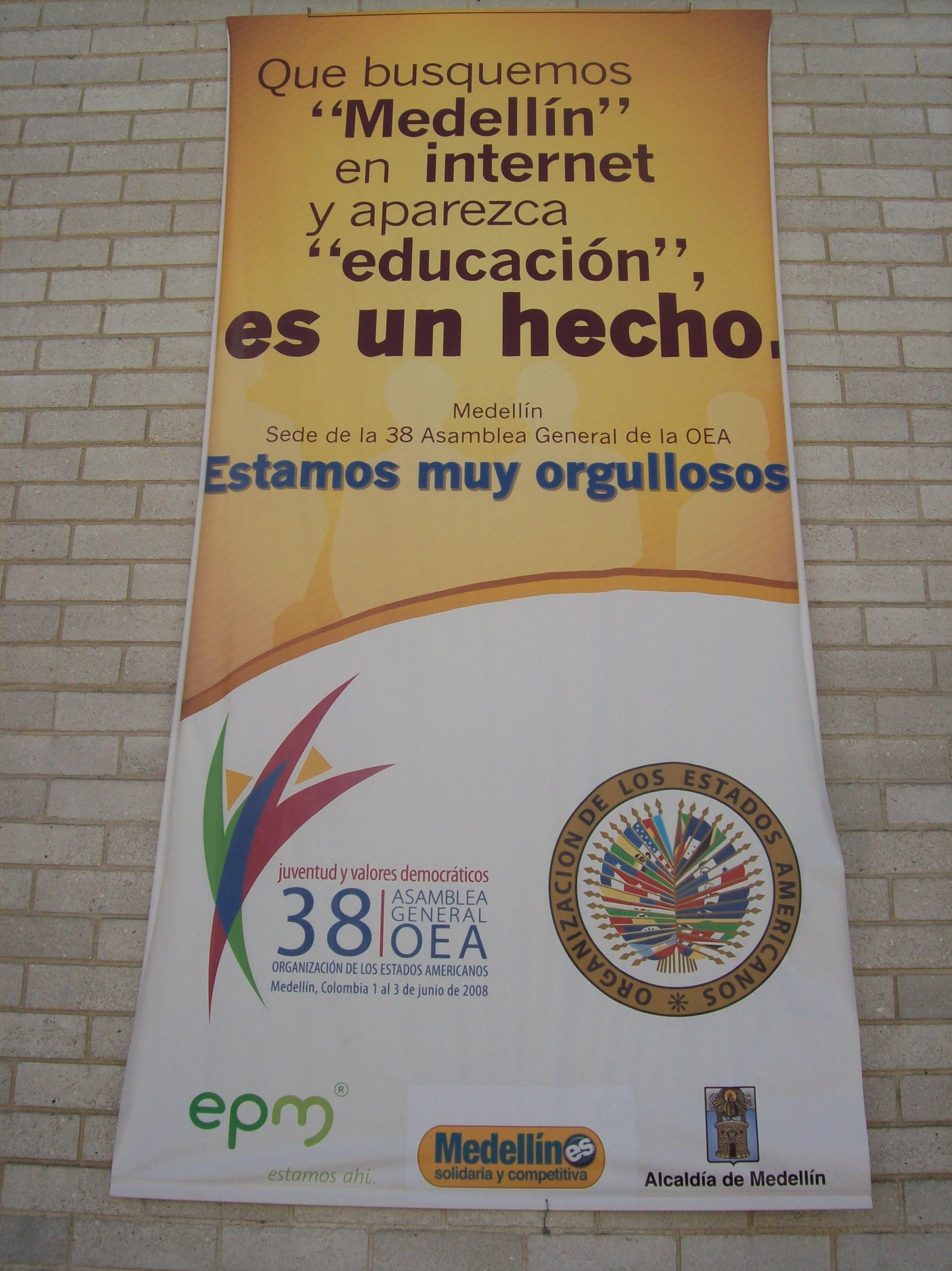
38th regular session – Medellín, 2008.

The General Assembly of the Organization of American States (Spanish: Asamblea General de la Organización de los Estados Americanos) is the supreme decision-making body of the Organization of American States (OAS).

The General Assembly came into being as a part of the restructuring of the OAS that took place following adoption of the Protocol of Buenos Aires (signed 27 February 1967; in force as of 12 March 1970), which contained extensive amendments to the Organization's Charter. Prior to these changes, the OAS's top body was the Inter-American Conference, which in turn was the successor to the International Conference of American States.

The Charter requires that the General Assembly convene once every year in a regular session. In special circumstances, and with the approval of two-thirds of the member states, the Permanent Council can convene special sessions.

The Organization's member states take turns hosting the General Assembly on a rotating basis. The states are represented at its sessions by their chosen delegates: generally, their ministers of foreign affairs, or their appointed deputies. Each state has one vote, and most matters – except for those for which the Charter or the General Assembly's own rules of procedure specifically require a two-thirds majority – are settled by a simple majority vote.

The General Assembly's powers include setting the OAS's general course and policies by means of resolutions and declarations; approving its budget and determining the contributions payable by the member states; approving the reports and previous year's actions of the OAS's specialized agencies; and electing members to serve on those agencies.

== Regular sessions ==
Rank	Host city	Host country	Date
1st	San José	Costa Rica	14–23 April 1971
2nd	Washington, D.C.	United States	11–21 April 1972
3rd	Washington, D.C.	United States	4–15 April 1973
4th	Atlanta	United States	19 April – 1 May 1974
5th	Washington, D.C.	United States	8–19 May 1975
6th	Santiago	Chile	4–18 June 1976
7th	St. George's	Grenada	14–22 June 1977
8th	Washington, D.C.	United States	21 June – 1 July 1978
9th	La Paz	Bolivia	22–31 October 1979
10th	Washington, D.C.	United States	19–26 November 1980
11th	Castries	Saint Lucia	2–11 December 1981
12th	Washington, D.C.	United States	15–21 December 1982
13th	Washington, D.C.	United States	14–18 November 1983
14th	Brasília	Brazil	12–17 November 1984
15th	Cartagena	Colombia	5–9 December 1985
16th	Guatemala City	Guatemala	11–15 November 1986
17th	Washington, D.C.	United States	9–14 November 1987
18th	San Salvador	El Salvador	14–19 November 1988
19th	Washington, D.C.	United States	13–18 November 1989
20th	Asunción	Paraguay	4–8 June 1990
21st	Santiago	Chile	3–8 June 1991
22nd	Nassau	Bahamas	18–23 May 1992
23rd	Managua	Nicaragua	7–11 June 1993
24th	Belém	Brazil	6–10 June 1994
25th	Montrouis	Haiti	5–9 June 1995
26th	Panama City	Panama	3–7 June 1996
27th	Lima	Peru	1–5 June 1997
28th	Caracas	Venezuela	1–3 June 1998
29th	Guatemala City	Guatemala	6–8 June 1999
30th	Windsor	Canada	4–6 June 2000
31st	San José	Costa Rica	3–5 June 2001
32nd	Bridgetown	Barbados	2–4 June 2002
33rd	Santiago	Chile	8–10 June 2003
34th	Quito	Ecuador	6–8 June 2004
35th	Fort Lauderdale	United States	5–7 June 2005
36th	Santo Domingo	Dominican Republic	4–6 June 2006
37th	Panama City	Panama	3–5 June 2007
38th	Medellín	Colombia	1–3 June 2008
39th	San Pedro Sula	Honduras	2–3 June 2009
40th	Lima	Peru	6–8 June 2010
41st	San Salvador	El Salvador	5–7 June 2011
42nd	Cochabamba	Bolivia	3–5 June 2012
43rd	Antigua Guatemala	Guatemala	4–6 June 2013
44th	Asunción	Paraguay	3–5 June 2014
45th	Washington, D.C.	United States	15–16 June 2015
46th	Santo Domingo	Dominican Republic	13–15 June 2016
47th	Cancún	Mexico	18–21 June 2017
48th	Washington, D.C.	United States	4–5 June 2018
49th	Medellín	Colombia	26–28 June 2019
50th	Washington, D.C.	United States	20–21 October 2020
51st	Guatemala City (Virtual)	Guatemala	10–12 November 2021
52nd	Lima	Peru	5–7 October 2022
53rd	Washington, D.C.	United States	21–23 June 2023
54th	Asunción	Paraguay	26–28 June 2024
55th	St. John's	Antigua and Barbuda	25–27 June 2025
56th	Panama City	Panama	22–24 June 2026

== See also ==
- Summit of the Americas
