= Comparative constitutional law =

Branch of constitutional law

Comparative constitutional law is a branch of constitutional law that focuses on the study and analysis of the constitutions of different countries to identify similarities, differences, and trends in the organization and functioning of constitutional systems. This comparative approach enables legal professionals, academics, and practitioners to gain a better understanding of the various ways in which fundamental rights are structured and protected, as well as the diverse methods by which state powers are organized.

== Definition and scope ==
Comparative constitutional law involves the systematic comparison of constitutional norms, governmental institutions, and political practices across different nations. This field examines similarities and differences in governmental structures, fundamental rights, judicial systems, and relationships among various branches of the State.

The scope of comparative constitutional law is broad, encompassing the study of written and unwritten constitutions and unitary, federal, and confederal systems. It addresses fundamental issues such as the separation of powers, protection of human rights, political representation, and the resolution of constitutional conflicts.

== See also ==
- Constitutional Law
- Law
