= Charter of the Organization of American States =

1948 Pan-American treaty

The Charter of the Organization of the American States (otherwise known the Charter of the OAS) is a Pan-American treaty that sets out the creation of the Organization of American States. It was signed at the Ninth International Conference of American States of 30 April 1948, held in Bogotá, Colombia. The treaty came into effect on 13 December 1951.

== Amendments ==
It has been amended by the:

- Protocol of Buenos Aires (27 February 1967)
- Protocol of Cartagena (5 December 1985)
- Protocol of Washington (14 December 1992)
- Protocol of Managua (10 June 1993)

== Signatories ==
The American countries that are signatories of the OAS Charter are, ordered by accession date:

- Argentina (1948)
- Bolivia (1948)
- Brazil (1948)
- Chile (1948)
- Colombia (1948)
- Costa Rica (1948)
- Cuba (1948) – By resolution of the Eighth Meeting of Consultation of the Ministers of Foreign Affairs (1962) Cuba was excluded from participating in the OAS, but this resolution ceased to have effect in 2009 by the OAS resolution AG/RES. 2438 (XXXIX-O/09).
- Ecuador (1948)
- El Salvador (1948)
- United States of America (1948)
- Guatemala (1948)
- Haiti (1948)
- Honduras (1948) Suspended after the 2009 coup that ousted President Manuel Zelaya. Readmitted in May 2011.
- Mexico (1948)
- Nicaragua (1948)
- Panama (1948)
- Paraguay (1948)
- Peru (1948)
- Dominican Republic (1948)
- Uruguay (1948)
- Venezuela (1948)
- Antigua and Barbuda (1967)
- Barbados (1967)
- Trinidad and Tobago (1967)
- Jamaica (1969)
- Grenada (1975)
- Suriname (1977)
- Dominica (1979)
- Saint Lucia (1979)
- Saint Vincent and the Grenadines (1981)
- Bahamas (1982)
- Saint Kitts and Nevis (1984)
- Canada (1990)
- Belize (1991)
- Guyana (1991)
