= World Law Foundation =

International organization based in Spain

The World Law Foundation (WLF) is an international organization created by renowned jurists from around the world. Founded in 2019 as the executive branch of the World Jurist Association, its main purpose is the defense of the rule of law. It is based in Madrid, Spain.

== History ==
The World Law Foundation (WLF) was created as a not-for-profit entity following the "Madrid Declaration" that closed the 2019 World Law Congress. It was registered on January 14, 2020, and published in the Boletín Oficial del Estado (BOE) on September 14, 2020.

== Governance and people ==
The World Law Foundation is based in Madrid, Spain, and serves as the executive branch of the World Jurist Association (WJA) (established 1963 at the first World Law Congress; based in the United States).

The WLF is governed by a board of trustees and a series of executive committees. It is supported by public and private donations, and overseen by the Protectorado de Fundaciones of the Spanish Ministry of Justice.

As of 2023, lawyer Javier Cremades is chair of the board of trustees.

Alfredo Dagnino, lawyer for the Spanish Council of State, is or was secretary. Its members include Colombian lawyer Ulises Fernández Rojas; Lebanese lawyer Hachem Boulos, James M. Black II, jurist and professor at Hofstra University; and president of the Catalan Bar Council María Eugenia Gay.

As of 2023 Javier Cremades is president of both WLF and the World Jurist Association.

== Purpose ==
The World Law Foundation is modeled on Winston Churchill's historic "Iron Curtain speech" (1946) that favored the law over the use of force. Its objectives are the defense of the rule of law as a guarantee of progress; the promotion of dialogue between nations; respect for the law in international relations; and cooperation between the different legal and political actors in the different countries.

== Activities ==
The WLF undertakes research and publishes works; provides advice to entities, governments and other non-governmental bodies; and puts on educational and training projects.

Along with the WJA, the WLF co-organizes events such as the World Law Congress and the Environmental Sustainability Congress (CSMA). The World Law Congress is held every two years and brings together conferences of different organizations.

The World Law Congress, held in Madrid in February 2019 under the slogan "Constitution, Democracy and Liberty" was held over three days. It addressed several topics, including the relationship between democracy and the constitution; parliamentary monarchies or the rule of law and the reaffirmation of peace through the mechanisms of law. During the congress, the World Peace & Liberty Award was presented to King Felipe VI of Spain for his response to the sovereignty challenge in Catalonia.

The World Law Foundation together with the World Association of Jurists award the World Peace & Liberty Award, which has been received by Winston Churchill, René Cassin, Nelson Mandela, King Felipe VI (2019), and by Ruth Bader Ginsburg (2020), U.S. Supreme Court Justice and founder of the Women's Rights Section of the American Civil Liberties Union.
