= Cremades & Calvo-Sotelo =

Cremades & Calvo Sotelo
- Headquarters: Madrid
- Offices: Spain, Colombia, Argentina, Mexico, France, Puerto Rico, Chile, Israel
- Date founded: 1995
- Founder: Javier Cremades
- Website: https://www.cremadescalvosotelo.com/

Cremades & Calvo-Sotelo is a law firm headquartered in Madrid with locations in eight countries. Founded in Madrid in 1995, the firm is chaired by Javier Cremades, founding partner, and integrates lawyers specialized in several disciplines of law.

== Development ==
Started in 1995, the firm was renamed "Cremades & Calvo-Sotelo" in 2000, when Santiago Calvo-Sotelo y Olry de Labry, grandson of politician José Calvo Sotelo, joined the firm. The founding partners of the firm are bound to Opus Dei.

In its beginnings, the firm was classified as a legal boutique, specialized in ICT law, but over the years it has established itself in all areas of law. It is one of the law firms in Spain that offers global services from legal perspective: institutional relations, business development, and lobbying services.

The firm has defended numerous groups in different circumstances through class actions. The firm has also stood out for representing the Venezuelan opposition in the defense of Leopoldo López.

== Collective action ==
The firm has a department within the procedural law area dedicated to collective actions, inaugurated with the creation of the Spanish Association of Minority Shareholders of Listed Companies (AEMEC). Thus, throughout its trajectory, the firm has legally represented various groups such as: former shareholders of Galerías Preciados regarding the expropriation of Rumasa (2002); those affected by the Madoff case; those affected by the closure of the airspace on the bank holiday of Constitution Day 2010; claimants of the listing of Bankia on the Spanish Stock Market; claimants of the sale of Banco Popular; claimants of the volatilization of savings in Novo Banco; defense of minority shareholders in the MasMovil group and the delisting of the company from the Stock Market; representation of Portland in FCC takeover bid; or the revocation and restitution of the yacht Fortuna to the Foundation for Culture and Tourism of the Balearic Islands, and the claims of the relatives of the elderly who have perished from the COVID-19 pandemic in nursing homes and geriatric centers.

== Practice areas and offices ==
Corporate and M&A; Procedural law; Civil, family and inheritance law; Personal injury and insurance; Real estate law; Criminal law; Human rights; Administrative law; New technologies and data protection; Immigration law; Intellectual and industrial property and competition law; Tax law; Labor law;Institutional relations, lobbying and business development.

Cremades & Calvo-Sotelo has fifteen delegations and is present in eight countries (Bogotá, Buenos Aires, Mexico City, Paris, Puerto Rico, Santiago de Chile and Tel Aviv). It has promoted the creation of professional groups of law firms and international associations of a legal nature: Euro-Latam Lex, the International Financial Litigation Network, network made up of more than twenty international law firms.

== Other roles ==
Since 2019, Cremades has held the presidency of the World Jurist Association, present in 85 countries and with consultative status before the United Nations.

== Law school ==
The company incorporates between 15 and 20 new lawyers each year through a dual system, where the selected lawyers work as lawyers and at the same time are trained with a master's degree in one of the firm's specialties. Since 1998 Cremades & Calvo-Sotelo has collaborated with several universities for the development of different postgraduate courses, as the Master in Telecommunications, Internet and Audiovisual Business and Law (XXIV editions); Master in Energy Business and Law (XVIII editions) and a Master in Business Legal Advice Management (XV editions).

In 2018, together with the European University, the firms created the Cremades & Calvo-Sotelo Law School. In 2020, an Agreement was signed with the San Pablo-CEU University. Every year there is a call for partial and full scholarships for the completion of the different master's degrees.

Cremades & Calvo-Sotelo has an advisory board made up of qualified professionals from the world of politics, economics, diplomacy and national and international law.

== Acknowledgments ==
The company was ranked the sixth most prestigious firm in Spain by Forbes in 2014. The legal guide Best Lawyers included thirty lawyers from the firm in 2020.

== Related links ==
- Official website
