= Itzhak Nener =

Israeli jurist

- יצחק ננר
- Born: 22 August 1919; Vienna, Austria
- Died: 27 April 2012 (aged 92); Jerusalem, Israel
- Resting place: Har HaMenuchot, Jerusalem
- Education: Hebrew University of Jerusalem
- Occupations: Jurist, lawyer
- Employer(s): Nener & Co. Law Office & Notary
- Political party: Liberal Party
- Spouse: Blanca Stein
- Children: Navah, Ofer, Yehoshua 'Shuky'

Itzhak Nener (Hebrew: יצחק ננר; born Yitzhak Nener; 22 August 1919 - 27 April 2012) was an Israeli jurist who co-founded the International Association of Jewish Lawyers and Jurists and served as vice-president of Liberal International.

== Early life and education ==
Yitzhak Nener was born on 22 August 1919 in Vienna, Austria. As an infant his family moved to the city of Stanisławów in Galicia, Poland, now Ivano-Frankivsk, Ukraine. In 1938, at the age of 19, he moved to Mandatory Palestine, making the journey on a ship with almost 1,000 Jewish students from all over Poland enrolled at the Hebrew University of Jerusalem.

He travelled on the ship with fellow student and Zionist activist, Blanca Stein; they married the following year, in 1939. Both of their families, whom they had left behind in Poland, were murdered in the Holocaust.

At the Hebrew University of Jerusalem, Nener studied social sciences, sociology, philosophy and history, and later law at the British Mandate High School of Law, writing one of the first academic publications on the Holocaust.

== Political and public career ==
In 1960 Nener was elected to the Municipality of Jerusalem.

Nener was a member of the Liberal Party leadership and served as Vice President of Liberal International. According to former justice minister and deputy prime minister, Moshe Nissim, "He fought like a lion against anti-Israeli decisions."

Nener was the first Jew and Israeli to be elected honorary president of the World Jurist Association (WJA), and "was honored and held important positions in the organization" according to former president of the Supreme Court of Israel, Meir Shamgar. In 2005 at the global congress of WJA in Shanghai, China, Nener received a medal in honour of his contribution to peace and the rule of law.

Nener was one of the founders of the International Association of Jewish Lawyers and Jurists (IAJLJ), and served as Deputy President. In June 1998 at a conference of the IAJLJ in the city of Thessaloniki in Greece, Nener cautioned that “the international revisionist movement, using the Internet and an orchestrated propaganda campaign, could warp the historical memory of younger generations;” and that "the denial movement has a historical institute which is reviewing history and whose real aim is to deny the Holocaust.”

In June 1999 in Berlin, Nener warned that "there are some very disturbing signs" of rising antisemitism in Germany and across Europe, but that "Germany is one of the few countries in Europe which has adopted legislation" to fight these trends.

== Legal career ==
Nener was one of the founders of the Israel Bar Association and served as the first chairperson of the Jerusalem District Committee from 1965 to 1971, before being elected chairperson of the association's national council in 1972, a position he served in until 1987.

Nener founded the law firm Nener Law Office in 1951 in Jerusalem, where he worked until his later years. The business operates to the present day as Nener & Co. Law Office & Notary, under the management of Itzhak's son, Yehoshua Nener.

== Awards and recognition ==
In 2000, Nener was awarded the Yakir Yerushalayim annual citizenship prize.

In September 2017, the Municipality of Jerusalem announced that a street in the city would be named after Itzhak Nener.

== Death ==
He died on 27 April 2012. His remains are at Har HaMenuchot, Jerusalem.
