= Minamata Convention on Mercury =

International treaty to reduce releases of mercury

Minamata Convention
Minamata Convention on Mercury
- Type: United Nations treaty
- Signed: 10 October 2013; 11 years ago
- Location: Kumamoto, Japan
- Effective: 16 August 2017
- Condition: Ninety days after the ratification by at least 50 states
- Signatories: 128
- Parties: 153
- Depositary: Secretary-General of the United Nations
- Languages: Arabic, Chinese, English, French, Russian, Spanish
- http://www.mercuryconvention.org/

The Minamata Convention on Mercury is an international treaty designed to protect human health and the environment from anthropogenic emissions and releases of mercury and mercury compounds. The convention was a result of three years of meeting and negotiating, after which the text of the convention was approved by delegates representing close to 140 countries on 19 January 2013 in Geneva and adopted and signed later that year on 10 October 2013 at a diplomatic conference held in Kumamoto, Japan. The convention is named after the Japanese city Minamata. This naming is of symbolic importance as the city went through a devastating incident of mercury poisoning. It is expected that over the next few decades, this international agreement will enhance the reduction of mercury pollution from the targeted activities responsible for the major release of mercury to the immediate environment.

The objective of the Minamata Convention is to protect the human health and the environment from anthropogenic emissions and releases of mercury and mercury compounds. It contains, in support of this objective, provisions that relate to the entire life cycle of mercury, including controls and reductions across a range of products, processes and industries where mercury is used, released or emitted. The treaty also addresses the direct mining of mercury, its export and import, its safe storage and its disposal once as waste. Pinpointing populations at risk, boosting medical care and better training of health-care professionals in identifying and treating mercury-related effects will also result from implementing the convention.

The Minamata Convention provides controls over a myriad of products containing mercury, the manufacture, import and export of which will be altogether prohibited by 2020, except where countries have requested an exemption for an initial 5-year period. These products include certain types of batteries, compact fluorescent lamps, relays, soaps and cosmetics, thermometers, and blood pressure devices. Dental fillings which use mercury amalgam are also regulated under the convention, and their use must be phased down through a number of measures.

== Background on mercury ==
Mercury is a naturally occurring element. It can be released to the environment from natural sources – such as weathering of mercury-containing rocks, forest fires, volcanic eruptions or geothermal activities – but also from human activities. An estimated 5500-8900 tons of mercury is currently emitted and re-emitted each year to the atmosphere, with much of the re-emitted mercury considered to be related to human activity, as are the direct releases.

Due to its unique properties, mercury has been used in various products and processes for hundreds of years. Currently, it is mostly utilised in industrial processes that produce chloride (PVC) production, and polyurethane elastomers. It is extensively used to extract gold from ore in artisanal and small-scale gold mining. It is contained in products such as some electrical switches (including thermostats), relays, measuring and control equipment, energy-efficient fluorescent light bulbs, some types of batteries and dental amalgam. It is also used in laboratories, cosmetics, pharmaceuticals, including in vaccines as a preservative, paints, and jewelry. Mercury is also released unintentionally from some industrial processes, such as coal-fired power and heat generation, cement production, mining and other metallurgic activities such as non-ferrous metals production, as well as from incineration of many types of waste.

The single largest source of human-made mercury emissions is the artisanal and small-scale gold mining sector, which is responsible for the release of as much as 1,000 tonnes of mercury to the atmosphere every year.

== History of the negotiations ==
Mercury and mercury compounds have long been known to be toxic to human health and the environment. Large-scale public health crises due to mercury poisoning, such as Minamata disease and Niigata Minamata disease, drew attention to the issue. In 1972, delegates to the Stockholm Conference on the Human Environment witnessed Japanese junior high school student Shinobu Sakamoto, disabled as the result of methylmercury poisoning in utero. The United Nations Environment Programme (UN Environment, previously UNEP) was established shortly thereafter. UN Environment has been actively engaged in bringing the science of mercury poisoning to policy implementation. In 2001, the executive director of UN Environment was invited by its governing council to undertake a global assessment of mercury and its compounds, including the chemistry and health effects, sources, long-range transport, as well as prevention and control technologies relating to mercury.

In 2003, the governing council considered this assessment and found that there was sufficient evidence of significant global adverse impacts from mercury and its compounds to warrant further international action to reduce the risks to human health and the environment from their release to the environment. Governments were urged to adopt goals for the reduction of mercury emissions and releases and UN Environment initiated technical assistance and capacity-building activities to meet these goals.

A mercury programme to address the concerns posed by mercury was established and further strengthened by governments in 2005 and 2007 with the UNEP Global Mercury Partnership. In 2007, the governing council concluded that the options of enhanced voluntary measures and new or existing international legal instruments should be reviewed and assessed in order to make progress in addressing the mercury issue. In February 2009, the governing council of UNEP decided to develop a global legally binding instrument on mercury.

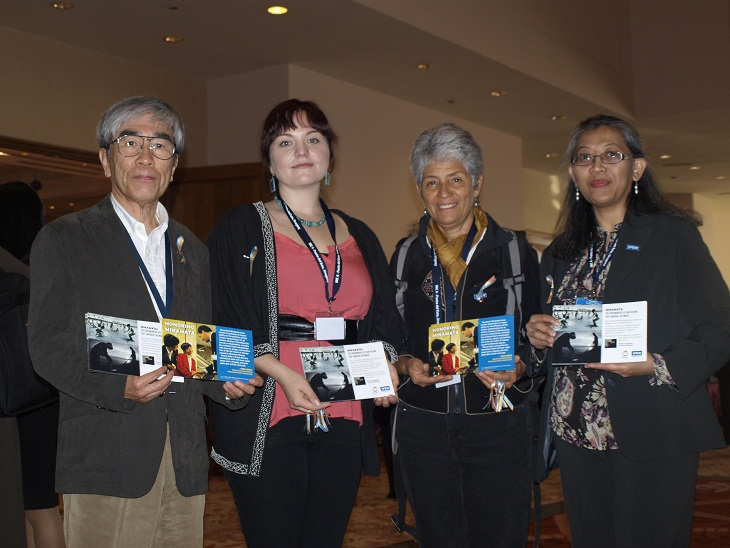
International Pollutants Elimination Network at INC4 in Punta del Este, 2012

An intergovernmental negotiating committee (INC) was promptly established, through which countries negotiated and developed the text of the convention. Other stakeholders, including intergovernmental and non-governmental organizations also participated in the process and contributed through sharing of views, experience and technical expertise. The Intergovernmental Negotiating Committee was chaired by Fernando Lugris of Uruguay and supported by the Chemicals and Health Branch of UN Environment's Economy Division. The INC held five sessions to discuss and negotiate a global agreement on mercury:

- INC 1, 7 to 11 June 2010, in Stockholm, Sweden
- INC 2, 24 to 28 January 2011, in Chiba, Japan
- INC 3, 31 October to 4 November 2011, in Nairobi, Kenya
- INC 4, 27 June to 2 July 2012, in Punta del Este, Uruguay
- INC 5, 13 to 18 January 2013, in Geneva, Switzerland

On 19 January 2013, after negotiating late into the night, the negotiations concluded with close to 140 governments agreeing to the draft convention text. The convention was adopted and opened for signature for one year on 10 October 2013, at a conference of plenipotentiaries (diplomatic conference) in Kumamoto, Japan, preceded by a preparatory meeting from 7–8 October 2013. The European Union and 86 countries signed the convention on the first day it was opened for signature. A further 5 countries signed the convention on the final day of the diplomatic conference, 11 October 2013. In total, the convention has 128 signatories.

Fernando Lugris, the Uruguayan chair delegate, proclaimed, "Today in the early hours of 19 January 2013 we have closed a chapter on a journey that has taken four years of often intense but ultimately successful negotiations and opened a new chapter towards a sustainable future. This has been done in the name of vulnerable populations everywhere and represents an opportunity for a healthier and more sustainable century for all peoples."

Further to the adoption of the convention, the intergovernmental negotiating committee was mandated to meet during the interim period preceding the opening of the first meeting of the Conference of the Parties to the convention to facilitate its rapid entry into force and effective implementation upon entry into force. Two sessions of the INC were held:

- INC 6, 3 to 7 November 2014, in Bangkok, Thailand
- INC 7, 10 to 15 March 2016, in Dead Sea, Jordan

Discussions covered a number of technical, financial as well as administrative and operational aspects.

The convention required to enter into force the deposit of fifty instruments of ratification, acceptance, approval or accession by states or regional economic integration organizations. This fifty-ratification milestone was reached on 18 May 2017, hence the convention entered into force on 16 August 2017.

The first meeting of Conference of the Parties to the Minamata Convention on Mercury (COP1) took place from 24 to 29 September 2017 at the International Conference Center in Geneva.

The second meeting of the Conference of the Parties (COP2) took place from 19 to 23 November 2018 at the International Conference Center in Geneva, Switzerland.

The third meeting of the Conference of the Parties (COP3) took place from 25 to 29 November 2019 at the International Conference Center in Geneva, Switzerland. At its third meeting, the Conference of the Parties agreed on a number of action items to effectively implement the Minamata Convention.

After the convention entered into force, the Conference of the Parties took place yearly for the first three years. From now onward, next Conference of the Parties (COPs) will be convened in every two years.

The fourth meeting of the Conference of the Parties (https://www.mercuryconvention.org/en/meetings/cop4) (COP4) will take place in Nusa Dua, Bali, Indonesia from 21 to 25 March 2022.

== List of signatories and parties ==
As of September 2025, there are 128 signatories to the treaty and 153 parties.

Participant	Signature	Ratification, acceptance (A), approval (AA), accession (a)
Afghanistan	—	2 May 2017 (a)
Albania	9 October 2014	26 May 2020
Algeria	—	30 November 2022 (a)
Angola	11 October 2013	
Antigua and Barbuda	—	23 September 2016 (a)
Argentina	10 October 2013	25 September 2017
Armenia	10 October 2013	13 December 2017
Australia	10 October 2013	7 December 2021
Austria	10 October 2013	12 June 2017
Bahamas	—	12 February 2020 (a)
Bahrain	—	6 July 2021 (a)
Bangladesh	10 October 2013	18 April 2023
Belarus	23 September 2014	
Belgium	10 October 2013	26 February 2018
Belize	—	12 June 2023 (a)
Benin	10 October 2013	7 November 2016
Bolivia	10 October 2013	26 January 2016
Botswana	—	3 June 2016 (a)
Brazil	10 October 2013	8 August 2017
Bulgaria	10 October 2013	18 May 2017
Burkina Faso	10 October 2013	10 April 2017
Burundi	14 February 2014	26 March 2021
Cambodia	10 October 2013	8 April 2021
Cameroon	24 September 2014	10 March 2021
Canada	10 October 2013	7 April 2017
Central African Republic	10 October 2013	31 March 2021
Chad	25 September 2014	24 September 2015
Chile	10 October 2013	27 August 2018
China	10 October 2013	31 August 2016
Colombia	10 October 2013	26 August 2019
Comoros	10 October 2013	23 July 2019
Congo, Republic of the	8 October 2014	6 August 2019
Costa Rica	10 October 2013	19 January 2017
Côte d'Ivoire	10 October 2013	1 October 2019
Croatia	24 September 2014	25 September 2017
Cuba	—	30 January 2018 (a)
Cyprus	24 September 2014	25 February 2020
Czech Republic	10 October 2013	19 June 2017
Denmark	10 October 2013	18 May 2017
Djibouti	10 October 2013	23 September 2014
Dominican Republic	10 October 2013	20 March 2018
Ecuador	10 October 2013	29 July 2016
El Salvador	—	20 June 2017 (a)
Equatorial Guinea	—	24 December 2019 (a)
Eritrea	—	7 February 2023 (a)
Estonia	—	21 June 2017 (a)
Eswatini	—	21 September 2016 (a)
Ethiopia	10 October 2013	19 August 2024
European Union	10 October 2013	18 May 2017 (AA)
Finland	10 October 2013	1 June 2017 (A)
France	10 October 2013	15 June 2017
Gabon	30 June 2014	24 September 2014 (A)
Gambia	10 October 2013	7 November 2016
Georgia	10 October 2013	17 July 2023
Germany	10 October 2013	15 September 2017
Ghana	24 September 2014	23 March 2017
Greece	10 October 2013	10 June 2020
Guatemala	10 October 2013	
Guinea	25 November 2013	21 October 2014
Guinea-Bissau	24 September 2014	22 October 2018
Guyana	10 October 2013	24 September 2014
Honduras	24 September 2014	22 March 2017
Hungary	10 October 2013	18 May 2017
Iceland	—	3 May 2018 (a)
India	30 September 2014	18 June 2018
Indonesia	10 October 2013	22 September 2017
Iran	10 October 2013	16 June 2017
Iraq	10 October 2013	16 September 2021
Ireland	10 October 2013	18 March 2019
Israel	10 October 2013	26 September 2025
Italy	10 October 2013	5 January 2021
Jamaica	10 October 2013	19 July 2017
Japan	10 October 2013	2 February 2016 (A)
Jordan	10 October 2013	12 November 2015
Kenya	10 October 2013	22 September 2023
Kiribati	—	28 July 2017 (a)
Kuwait	10 October 2013	3 December 2015
Laos	—	21 September 2017 (a)
Latvia	24 September 2014	20 June 2017
Lebanon	—	13 October 2017 (a)
Lesotho	—	12 November 2014 (a)
Liberia	24 September 2014	24 September 2024 (A)
Libya	10 October 2013	
Liechtenstein	—	1 February 2017 (a)
Lithuania	10 October 2013	15 January 2018
Luxembourg	10 October 2013	21 September 2017
Madagascar	10 October 2013	13 May 2015
Malawi	10 October 2013	23 June 2023
Malaysia	24 September 2014	
Maldives		24 September 2024 (a)
Mali	10 October 2013	27 May 2016
Malta	8 October 2014	18 May 2017
Marshall Islands	—	29 January 2019 (a)
Mauritania	11 October 2013	18 August 2015
Mauritius	10 October 2013	21 September 2017
Mexico	10 October 2013	29 September 2015
Moldova	10 October 2013	20 June 2017
Monaco	24 September 2014	24 September 2014
Mongolia	10 October 2013	28 September 2015
Montenegro	24 September 2014	10 June 2019
Morocco	6 June 2014	
Mozambique	10 October 2013	19 February 2024
Namibia	—	6 September 2017 (a)
Nepal	10 October 2013	
Netherlands	10 October 2013	18 May 2017 (A)
New Zealand	10 October 2013	
Nicaragua	10 October 2013	29 October 2014
Niger	10 October 2013	9 June 2017
Nigeria	10 October 2013	1 February 2018
North Macedonia	25 July 2014	12 March 2020
Norway	10 October 2013	12 May 2017
Oman	—	23 June 2020 (a)
Pakistan	10 October 2013	16 December 2020
Palau	9 October 2014	21 June 2017
Palestine	—	18 March 2019 (a)
Panama	10 October 2013	29 September 2015
Paraguay	10 February 2014	26 June 2018
Peru	10 October 2013	21 January 2016
Philippines	10 October 2013	8 July 2020
Poland	24 September 2014	30 September 2021
Portugal	—	28 August 2018 (a)
Qatar	—	4 November 2020 (a)
Romania	10 October 2013	18 May 2017
Russia	24 September 2014	
Rwanda	—	29 June 2017 (a)
Saint Kitts and Nevis	—	24 May 2017 (a)
Saint Lucia	—	23 January 2019 (a)
Saint Vincent and the Grenadines	—	18 August 2023 (a)
Samoa	10 October 2013	24 September 2015
Sao Tome and Principe	—	30 August 2018 (a)
Saudi Arabia	—	27 February 2019 (a)
Senegal	11 October 2013	3 March 2016
Serbia	9 October 2014	4 December 2024
Seychelles	27 May 2014	13 January 2015
Sierra Leone	12 August 2014	1 November 2016
Singapore	10 October 2013	22 September 2017
Slovakia	10 October 2013	31 May 2017
Slovenia	10 October 2013	23 June 2017
South Africa	10 October 2013	29 April 2019
South Korea	24 September 2014	22 November 2019
Spain	10 October 2013	13 December 2021
Sri Lanka	8 October 2014	19 June 2017
Sudan	24 September 2014	
Suriname	—	2 August 2018 (a)
Sweden	10 October 2013	18 May 2017
Switzerland	10 October 2013	25 May 2016
Syria	24 September 2014	26 July 2017
Tanzania	10 October 2013	5 October 2020
Thailand	—	22 June 2017 (a)
Togo	10 October 2013	3 February 2017
Tonga	—	22 October 2018 (a)
Tunisia	10 October 2013	
Turkey	24 September 2014	4 October 2022
Tuvalu	—	7 June 2019 (a)
Uganda	10 October 2013	1 March 2019
Ukraine	—	18 August 2023 (a)
United Arab Emirates	10 October 2013	27 April 2015
United Kingdom	10 October 2013	23 March 2018
United States	6 November 2013	6 November 2013 (A)
Uruguay	10 October 2013	24 September 2014
Vanuatu	—	16 October 2018 (a)
Venezuela	10 October 2013	
Vietnam	11 October 2013	23 June 2017 (AA)
Yemen	21 March 2014	
Zambia	10 October 2013	11 March 2016
Zimbabwe	11 October 2013	19 August 2021

== Provisions ==
The convention has 35 articles, 5 annexes and a preamble.

The preamble of the convention states that the parties have recognized that mercury is, "a chemical of global concern owing to its long-range atmospheric transport, its persistence in the environment once anthropogenically introduced, its ability to bioaccumulate in ecosystems and its significant negative effects on human health and the environment."

=== Article 1 ===
- States the objective of the convention, which is "to protect the human health and the environment from anthropogenic emissions and releases of mercury and mercury compounds".

=== Article 2 ===
- Sets out definitions used in more than one Article of the convention, including:
  - "Artisanal and small-scale gold mining" which refers to gold mining conducted by individual miners or small enterprises with limited capital investment and production;
  - "Best available techniques";
  - "Best environmental practices" means using the most appropriate combination of environmental control measures and strategies;
  - "Mercury" specifically refers to elemental mercury (Hg), CAS No. 7439-97-6;
  - "Mercury compound";
  - "Mercury-added product" refers to a product or product component that contains mercury or a mercury compound that was intentionally added;
  - "Party" and "Parties present and voting";
  - "Primary mercury mining";
  - "Regional economic integration organization";
  - "Use allowed".

=== Article 3 ===
- Addresses the question of mercury supply sources and trade.
- The provisions of this Article do not apply to mercury compounds used for laboratory research, naturally occurring trace quantities of mercury or mercury compounds present, mercury-added products.
- It prohibits parties to allow mercury mining that was not being conducted prior to the date of entry into force of the convention for them, and it only allows mercury mining that was conducted at the date of entry into force for up to fifteen years after that date.
- It encourages countries to identify individual stocks of mercury or mercury compounds exceeding 50 metric tons as well as sources of mercury supply generating stocks exceeding 10 metric tons per year. If excess mercury from the decommissioning of chlor alkali facilities is available, such mercury is disposed of in accordance with the guidelines for environmentally sound management using operations that do not lead to recovery, recycling, reclamation, direct re-use or alternative uses.
- Parties are not allowed to export mercury without the written consent of the importing Party and only for either environmentally sound interim storage or a use allowed. These controls only apply to mercury, not to either mercury compounds or mercury-added products.

=== Article 4 ===
- Addresses the question of mercury-added products.
- The Convention employs two approaches to controlling mercury in products, namely setting a phase-out date for some, and specifying measures to be taken in allowing continued use for others.

=== Article 5 ===
- Deals with manufacturing processes in which mercury or mercury compounds are used.
- Sets out measures either to phase out or to restrict such existing processes.
- It also does not allow the development of new facilities that would use manufacturing processes listed in Annex B and discourages the development of new manufacturing processes in which mercury or mercury compounds are intentionally used.

=== Article 6 ===
- Relates to exemptions available to a Party upon request.
- A State or regional economic integration organization can register for one or more exemptions from the phase out dates listed in Parts I of Annexes A and B.
- They do so on becoming a Party, or in the case of a product or process that is added by amendment to the list, no later than the date upon which that amendment enters into force for it.
- Exemptions can be registered for a listed category or an identified sub-category.
- The registration is made by notifying the Secretariat in writing, and must be accompanied by a statement explaining the Party's need for the exemption.

=== Article 7 ===
- Deals with the question of artisanal and small-scale gold mining and processing in which mercury amalgamation is used to extract gold from ore.
- Each Party that has small-scale gold mining and processing within its territory has the general obligation to take steps to reduce the use of mercury and mercury compounds in such mining and processing needs to reduce, and where feasible eliminate, the use of mercury and mercury compounds in mining and processing, as well as the emissions and releases to the environment of mercury from such activities.
- Additional obligations, including the development and implementation of a national action plan, are laid out for a Party that determines that artisanal and small-scale gold mining and processing in its territory is more than insignificant.

=== Article 8 ===
- Concerns emissions of mercury and mercury compounds.
- It aims at controlling and, where feasible, reducing emissions of mercury and mercury compounds to the atmosphere, through measures to control emissions from the point sources listed in Annex D.
- The Article differentiates between measures required for new sources and those required for existing sources. Releases to land and water are not addressed in Article 8 – they are addressed in Article 9 of the convention.

=== Article 9 ===
- Addresses the releases of mercury and mercury compounds to land and water
- Aims at controlling and where feasible reducing releases of mercury and mercury compounds from significant anthropogenic point sources that are not addressed in other provisions of the convention.
- Each state should within three years after of date of entry into force of the Convention identify the relevant point source categories of releases of mercury into land and water.

=== Article 10 ===
- Applies to the environmentally sound interim storage of mercury other than waste mercury.
- Parties are requested to take measures to ensure that mercury and mercury compounds that are intended for a use allowed under the convention are stored in an environmentally sound manner, taking into account any guidelines and in accordance with any requirements that the Conference of Parties adopts.

=== Article 11 ===
- Deals with mercury wastes, including their definition, their management in an environmentally sound manner and transportation across international boundaries.

=== Article 12 ===
- Deals with contaminated sites.
- Each state needs to endeavour to develop appropriate strategies for identifying and assessing sites contaminated by mercury or mercury compounds.
- When taking action to reduce the risks posed by sites contaminated by mercury or mercury compounds, each Party is required to ensure that actions are performed in an environmentally sound manner, and actions incorporate, where appropriate, an assessment of the risks to human health and the environment from mercury or mercury compounds contained in these sites.

=== Article 13 ===
- Relates to the question of financial resources and mechanism.
- Establishes a mechanism for the provision of adequate, predictable and timely financial resources, comprising the Global Environment Facility Trust Fund and a specific international programme to support capacity building and technical assistance.

=== Article 14 ===
- Addresses the issues of capacity-building, technical assistance and technology transfer.
- Calls for cooperation between Parties to provide timely and appropriate capacity-building and technical assistance to developing country Parties, including through regional, sub regional and national arrangements.

=== Article 15 ===
- Establishes an Implementation and Compliance Committee to promote implementation of, and compliance with, all provisions of this convention.
- The Committee comprises 15 members nominated by Parties and elected by the Conference of the Parties.
- Issues can be taken up by the committee on self-referral by a Party, on the basis of information submitted under the reporting provisions, or upon request from the Conference of the Parties.

=== Article 16 ===
- Relates to health aspects.
- It encourages Parties to promote the development and implementation of strategies and programmes to identify and protect populations at risk It encourages Parties to adopt and implement science based educational and preventive programmes on occupational exposure to mercury and mercury compounds.
- It encourages Parties to promote appropriate health-care services for prevention, treatment and care for populations affected by the exposure to mercury or mercury compounds.
- Finally it encourages Parties to establish and strengthen institutional and health professional capacities.

=== Article 17 ===
- Deals with information exchange.
- Each party shall facilitate the exchange of information.

=== Article 18 ===
- Stresses the importance of public information, awareness and education.

=== Article 19 ===
- Relates to research, development and monitoring.

=== Article 20 ===
- Deals with the possibility for parties to develop an implementation plan.

=== Article 21 ===
- Parties shall report to the Conference of the Parties, through the secretariat on the measures taken to implement the provisions of the convention and the effectiveness of those measures as well as the possible challenges in meeting the objectives of the convention.
- Parties shall include in their reporting the information called for in the different articles of the convention.

=== Article 22 ===
- Deals with effectiveness evaluation.
- The Conference of the Parties needs to evaluate the effectiveness of the Convention no later than six years after the date of entry into force and periodically thereafter.

=== Article 23 ===
- Establishes the Conference of the Parties.

=== Article 24 ===
- Establishes the Secretariat, which is to be provided by the United Nations Environment Programme.

=== Article 25 ===
- Deals with the settlement of disputes between Parties.

=== Article 26 ===
- Sets the rules for the amendments to the convention.
- Amendments to the Convention may be proposed by any Party, and they must be adopted at a meeting of the Conference of the Parties.
- Ratification (acceptance or approval) of an amendment shall be notified to the Depositary in writing.

=== Article 27 ===
- Sets the rules for adoption and amendment of annexes.

=== Article 28 ===
- Establishes the rules for the right to vote: one party, one vote, except in the case of a regional economic integration organization, which, on matters within its competence, shall exercise its right to vote with a number of votes equal to the number of its members States that are Parties to the convention. Such an organization shall not exercise its right to vote if any of its member States exercises its right to vote and vice versa.

=== Article 29 ===
- Relates to the signature of the convention, which was open for one year until 9 October 2014.

=== Article 30 ===
- Deals with the ratification, acceptance, approval of the convention or accession thereto.

=== Article 31 ===
- Deals with the convention's entry into the force, which will take place on the ninetieth day after the date of deposit of the fiftieth instrument of ratification, acceptance, approval or accession.

=== Article 32 ===
- States that no reservations may be made to the convention.

=== Article 33 ===
- Gives the right to Parties to withdraw from the Convention at any time after three years from the date on which the convention has entered into force for them, through written notification to the Depositary.
- Any such withdrawal shall take effect one year after the receipt of the notification by the depositary or any later specified date.

=== Article 34 ===
- Names The Secretary-General of the United Nations as the depositary of the convention.

=== Article 35 ===
- States that the Arabic, Chinese, English, French, Russian and Spanish texts of the convention are equally authentic.

== Minamata Convention on Mercury COPs ==
- COP-1 (Geneva, Switzerland), 24–29 September 2017
- COP-2 (Geneva, Switzerland), 19–23 November 2018
- COP-3 (Geneva, Switzerland), 25–29 November 2019
- COP-4 (online; Bali, Indonesia), 01 - 5 November 2021 (first segment), 21–25 March 2022 (second segment)
- COP-5 (Geneva, Switzerland), 30 October - 3 November 2023

== See also ==
- Environmental law
- Environmental protocol
- International law
- List of international environmental agreements
- Mercury cycle
