= Hadassa Ben-Itto =

Israeli author and jurist (1926–2018)

- הדסה בן-עת
- Born: May 16, 1926; Brzeziny, Poland
- Died: April 15, 2018 (aged 91); Jerusalem
- Education: Hebrew University of Jerusalem
- Alma mater: Tel Aviv University
- Occupations: Author and jurist
- Spouse: Gershon Ben-Itto
- Children: Orly
- Relatives: David Lipmanowicz and Dvora Broder
- Writing career
- Notable work: The Lie That Wouldn't Die: The Protocols of the Elders of Zion
- Notable awards: Zeltner Prize

Hadassa Ben-Itto (Hebrew: הדסה בן-עתו; May 16, 1926 – April 15, 2018) was an Israeli author and jurist. She was best known for her bestselling book The Lie That Wouldn't Die: The Protocols of the Elders of Zion.

== Biography ==
Ben-Itto was born on May 16, 1926, in Brzeziny, Poland, to David Lipmanowicz (1904–1994) and Dvora Broder (1906–1988), both natives of Brzeziny. Her father worked as a building contractor. The family immigrated to Mandate Palestine in 1935, where another daughter, Nira, was born in 1937. Ben-Itto graduated from the Ma'aleh religious high school in Jerusalem and was an officer in the Israeli army during the 1948 Arab-Israeli War. She married Gershon Ben-Itto (born 1920) in 1950 and had a daughter, Orly, in 1957. The couple divorced in 1982.

After the 1948 war, Ben-Itto studied history, psychology and English literature at the Hebrew University of Jerusalem. She earned her law degree at Tel Aviv University in 1954 and took post-graduate courses in law and criminology at Northwestern University of Chicago and the University of Denver. She was admitted to the Israel Bar Association 1955. For the next five years, she worked as a lawyer in private practice, specializing in criminal law. Ben-Itto was appointed as a judge in Tel Aviv Magistrates' Court in 1960. In 1970 she moved to the Tel Aviv District Court. Between 1971 and 1974 she also taught criminal law at the Bar-Ilan University law school. While conducting a bank robbery trial in July 1980, she survived a bombing attack on her home, which may have been related to the trial. In 1980 she was appointed acting judge in the Israeli Supreme Court, and in 1988 became deputy president of the Tel Aviv District Court. She took early retirement from the court in 1991 in order to write her book, The Lie That Wouldn't Die: The Protocols of the Elders of Zion.

=== Committees and commissions ===
During her tenure as a judge, Ben-Itto was appointed to head several government committees, including a committee on prostitution in Israel convened by the Ministry of Justice and a committee on patient rights convened by the Ministry of Health. She was a member of committees dealing with prison reform, probation, and patient rights. In 1965 and 1975 she was a member of Israel's delegation to the United Nations General Assembly, holding the temporary rank of ambassador. She also represented Israel at international events, including the 1982 UNESCO Conference on Human Rights in Paris. From 1988 to 2004, she served as president of the International Association of Jewish Lawyers and Jurists. In 2004 she was elected honorary president, as well as head of a committee to combat antisemitism.

From 1998 to 2002, Ben-Itto was one of the 17 international arbiters (and only woman) on the Claims Resolution Tribunal in Zurich, which adjudicated claims against Swiss banks on behalf of Jewish depositors killed in the Holocaust. She was the winner of the 1999 Zeltner Prize for outstanding Israeli jurists, and a 2003 citation of merit by the Israel Bar Association.

== The Lie That Wouldn't Die ==
Ben-Itto began to research The Protocols of the Elders of Zion during her years on the bench, using her free time and court vacations to peruse the topic in footnoted academic studies. She found that not only was the subject little-known by Jews at large, but that historical and modern-day antisemitism draws from the Protocols. Desiring to write a book for the general public, she took early retirement in 1991 and spent six years writing The Lie That Wouldn't Die: The Protocols of the Elders of Zion.

The book was published in Hebrew in 1998 and has since been translated into ten languages, including German, Russian, Dutch, Hungarian, Romanian, Bulgarian, Spanish, English, Arabic and Persian.

With a flair for courtroom drama, Ben-Itto centers the book on the 1934 trial in Bern, Switzerland, where the local Jewish community took the local Nazi party to court for publishing the Protocols. While the lower court judge ruled that the Protocols was a work of plagiarism and constituted indecent literature, an appeals court threw out the claim of obscenity while agreeing with the lower court that the Protocols was "absolutely unjustified and outrageous insults and defamation".

== Later life and death ==
After the publication of her book, Ben-Itto would frequently speak and write about the relationship between antisemitism and current events, such as the 2006 Lebanon War and the Arab world protests of 2010–2011.

Ben-Itto died on April 15, 2018, in Jerusalem, at the age of 91.

== Bibliography ==
=== Books ===
- The Lie That Wouldn't Die: The Protocols of the Elders of Zion. London; Portland, Oregon: Vallentine Mitchell. 2005. ISBN 978-0-85303-602-9.

=== Selected articles ===
- "In This War, the Protocols are to Blame". Haaretz. August 22, 2006. Archived from the original on January 16, 2012.
- "I Am Ashamed". Haaretz. December 15, 2008. Archived from the original on January 16, 2012.
- "The Jewish Conspiracy: A Strategic Weapon to Demonize Jews and Delegitimize Israel". 10 (38). Jerusalem Center for Public Affairs. April 27, 2011.
