= Ved Prakash Nanda =

Indian-American academic (1934–2024)

- Born: November 20, 1934
- Died: January 1, 2024 (aged 89)
- Occupations: Lawyer, academic, writer

Ved Prakash Nanda (November 20, 1934 – January 1, 2024) was an Indian-American lawyer, academic, and writer, and was president of the American Hindu Swayamsevak Sangh (HSS).

== Early life and education ==
Ved Prakash Nanda was born in 1934 in Gujranwala in British Raj India, now in Pakistan. During the partition of India, he and his family migrated to Punjab state in India.

He obtained BA and MA degrees in economics from Punjab University; LL.B and LL.M degrees from Delhi University; and then an LL.M from Northwestern University, Evanston, Illinois, United States.

He then obtained postgraduate fellowship work at Yale University.

== Career ==
Nanda was a professor of international law at the Sturm College of Law, University of Denver, Colorado. He founded the International Legal Studies Program there in 1972.

In 2006 Nanda was honored with a $1 million founding gift from Denver University alumni Doug and Mary Scrivner to launch the Ved Nanda Center for International and Comparative Law, where he became director. His final titles at the university of Denver were as a Distinguished University Professor, and as Thompson G. Marsh Professor of Law.

== Other roles ==
Nanda was a president of the World Jurist Association sometime before 2000, and later an honorary president.

He was as a member of the executive committee of the American Society of International Law (the American branch of the International Law Association), becoming vice president and an honorary VP until his death. He was also the David Dudley Field Patron.

He was affiliated with numerous Hindu nationalist groups, including serving as the Sanghachalak (president) of the Hindu Swayamsevak Sangh and chairman of the board of Hindu University of America in Florida. His first exposure to Hindu nationalism came from attending meetings held by India's Rashtriya Swayamsevak Sangh as a young man in Delhi. He was a founder of the Hindu Temple of Denver.

== Writing and publications ==
Nanda acted as a faculty adviser to the Denver University Law Review and the Denver Law Forum. From 1991 he wrote a regular international affairs column for The Denver Post.

He was co-editor of the International Practitioner's Notebook, an American Branch publication previously published quarterly.

He was widely published, having authored or co-authored 24 books in various fields of international law. His writing addressed self-determination, international law with regard to interventions, and environmental policies.

== Recognition and honours ==
In 2006 Nanda was honored with a founding gift from Denver University alumni and friends to launch the Ved Nanda Center for International and Comparative Law.

He received two honorary doctorates: from Sōka University, Tokyo, Japan, and Bundelkhand University in Uttar Pradesh, India.

Nanda received several faculty awards at the University of Denver.

On 20 March 2018 he received the Padma Bhushan award in the field of literature and education.

In 2023 he was awarded the Charles Siegal Distinguished Service Award.

Nanda was posthumously awarded the Eleanor Roosevelt Prize for Global Human Rights Advancement by the American Bar Association in September 2024.

== Personal life and death ==
Nanda married Katherine Kunz in 1982. She died on August 28, 2023.

Condoleezza Rice, the secretary of state for President George W. Bush, was a former student of Nanda. She had kept in touch with him. In the U.S. Congress in 2017, Rep. Mike Coffman commented that his work has inspired a countless number of students to become a part of the conversation on Human Rights and International issues.

Nanda died on 1 January 2024 following a fall at his home.
