= List of ambassadors of Uruguay to China =

Coordinates: 39.945429°N 116.451316°E

Ambassador of Uruguay to China
- Incumbent; Fernando Lugris since December 2, 2015
- Inaugural holder: Alberto Milhas
- Formation: January 8, 1963

The Uruguayan ambassador in Beijing is the official representative of the Government in Montevideo to the Government of the People's Republic of China.

== List of representatives ==
Diplomatic agrément/Diplomatic accreditation	Ambassador	Observations	List of presidents of Uruguay	List of premiers of the People's Republic of China	Term end
January 8, 1963	Alberto Milhas	Alberto Milhas, the first Uruguayan ambassador to China, arrives to assume his post. Subsequently, Alberto Milhas was appointed by the Uruguayan Government as ambassador to China and Wang Chih-chen, Chinese ambassador to Argentina, was appointed concurrent ambassador to Uruguay.	Daniel Fernández Crespo	Chen Cheng	
October 7, 1965	Juan Bautista Ochoteco		Washington Beltrán	Yen Chia-kan	
November 15, 1969	Aurelop Pastori	New Uruguayan Ambassador to China Dr. Aurelop Pastori arrives.	Jorge Pacheco Areco	Yen Chia-kan	
April 3, 1971	Edison Bouchadon	Minister Councillor Edison Bouchadon reopened the Uruguayan Embassy in Taipei April 3, 1971, in his capacity as Charge d'affaires	Jorge Pacheco Areco	Yen Chia-kan	
January 1, 1978	Rodolfo Olavarría	Charge d'affaires: From 1999 to 2001 he was Uruguayan Ambassador to Paraguay.	Aparicio Méndez	Sun Yun-suan	1979
May 5, 1979	Buenuventura Caviglia Campora	Buenuventura Caviglia Campora arrives to become the Republic of Uruguay's first ambassador in the Republic of China.	Aparicio Méndez	Sun Yun-suan	1981
1981		The position of Uruguay's ambassador to ROC had been vacant since 1981.: Relations between the ROC and Uruguay had weakened in recent years as Peking increased purchases of wool from Uruguay. The position of Uruguay's ambassador to ROC had been vacant since 1981. Peking bought about U.S. $46 million worth of wool from Uruguay in the year ended October 1987, while the ROC's purchases for the same period were about $6.5 million, the United Daily News	Gregorio Álvarez	Sun Yun-suan	
February 3, 1988		The governments in Beijing and Montevideo esteablished of diplomatic relations.	Julio María Sanguinetti	Li Peng	
September 1, 1989	Guillermo Valles Galmés	18.10.89 18 Oct 89 Beijing, October 18 (XINHUA)— First Uruguayan Ambassador to China Guillermo Valles Galmes presented his	Julio María Sanguinetti	Li Peng	May 1, 1992
September 1, 1992	Julio Duranona		Luis Alberto Lacalle Herrera	Li Peng	June 1, 1996
May 6, 1996	Alvaro Alvarez (Uruguayan diplomatist)		Julio María Sanguinetti	Li Peng	2001
June 1, 2001	Pelayo Díaz		Jorge Batlle Ibáñez	Zhu Rongji	March 1, 2005
July 27, 2005	César Ferrer Burle		Tabaré Vázquez	Wen Jiabao	2006
March 1, 2007	Luis Almagro		Tabaré Vázquez	Wen Jiabao	
September 3, 2010	Rosario Portell		José Mujica	Wen Jiabao	
December 2, 2015	Fernando Lugris	On April 7, 2008 he became envoy in Berlin.; In April 2015 he was in Nairobi, as ambassador to the Preparatory Committee of the United Nations Conference on Urban Housing and Sustainable Urban Development (Habitat III) from 17-20 October 1016 hold in Quito, where Uruguay participated for the first time.	Tabaré Vázquez	Li Keqiang	
