= Pedro Vaz (diplomat) =

Uruguayan diplomat, politician, and lawyer

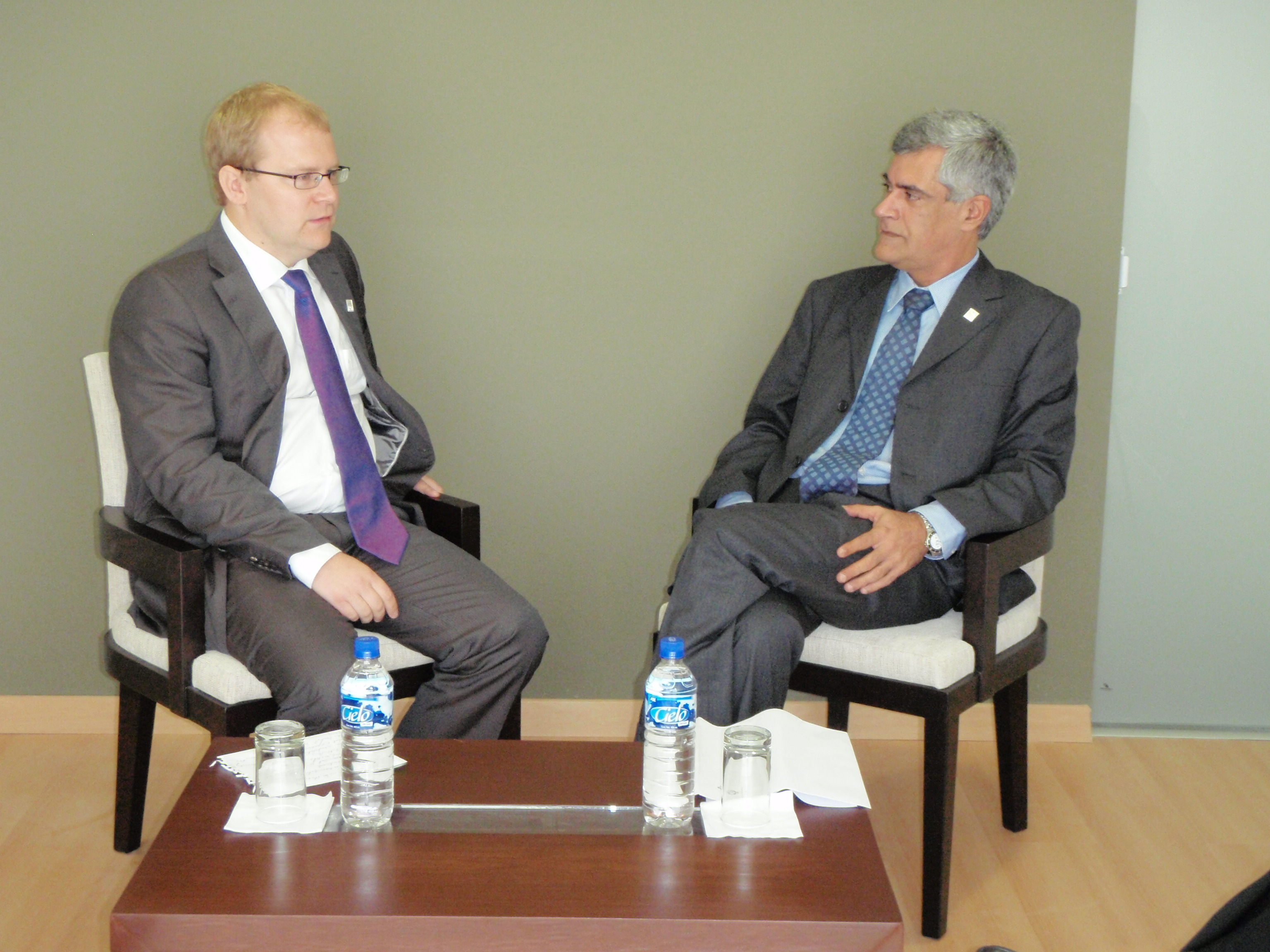
- Former Foreign Minister Pedro Vaz (right) meeting with Estonian Foreign Minister Urmas Paet.

Minister of Foreign Relations of Uruguay
- In office August 31, 2009 – March 1, 2010
- President: Tabaré Vázquez
- Preceded by: Gonzalo Fernández
- Succeeded by: Luis Almagro

Personal details
- Born: December 2, 1963 Rocha, Uruguay
- Died: December 6, 2012 (aged 49) Santiago, Chile
- Education: University of the Republic

Pedro Humberto Vaz Ramela (December 2, 1963 – December 6, 2012) was a Uruguayan diplomat, politician, and lawyer. Vaz served as the Minister of Foreign Relations of Uruguay from August 31, 2009 until March 1, 2010. In 2010, President José Mujica appointed him Ambassador to Chile.

== Biography ==
A lawyer by profession, Vaz served in Uruguayan diplomatic posts in Mexico and Switzerland earlier in his career. Vaz had also previously served as Ambassador to Brazil prior to becoming Foreign Minister.

Vaz died from a heart attack at his residence in the Los Condes neighborhood of Santiago, Chile, on December 6, 2012, at the age of 49. He received honors as Minister of State, in a ceremony at the Palacio Santos attended by foreign minister Luis Almagro and the apostolic nuncio Anselmo Guido Pecorari; his remains are buried at the Cemetery of Rocha.
