= Fernando Lugris =

Uruguayan diplomat

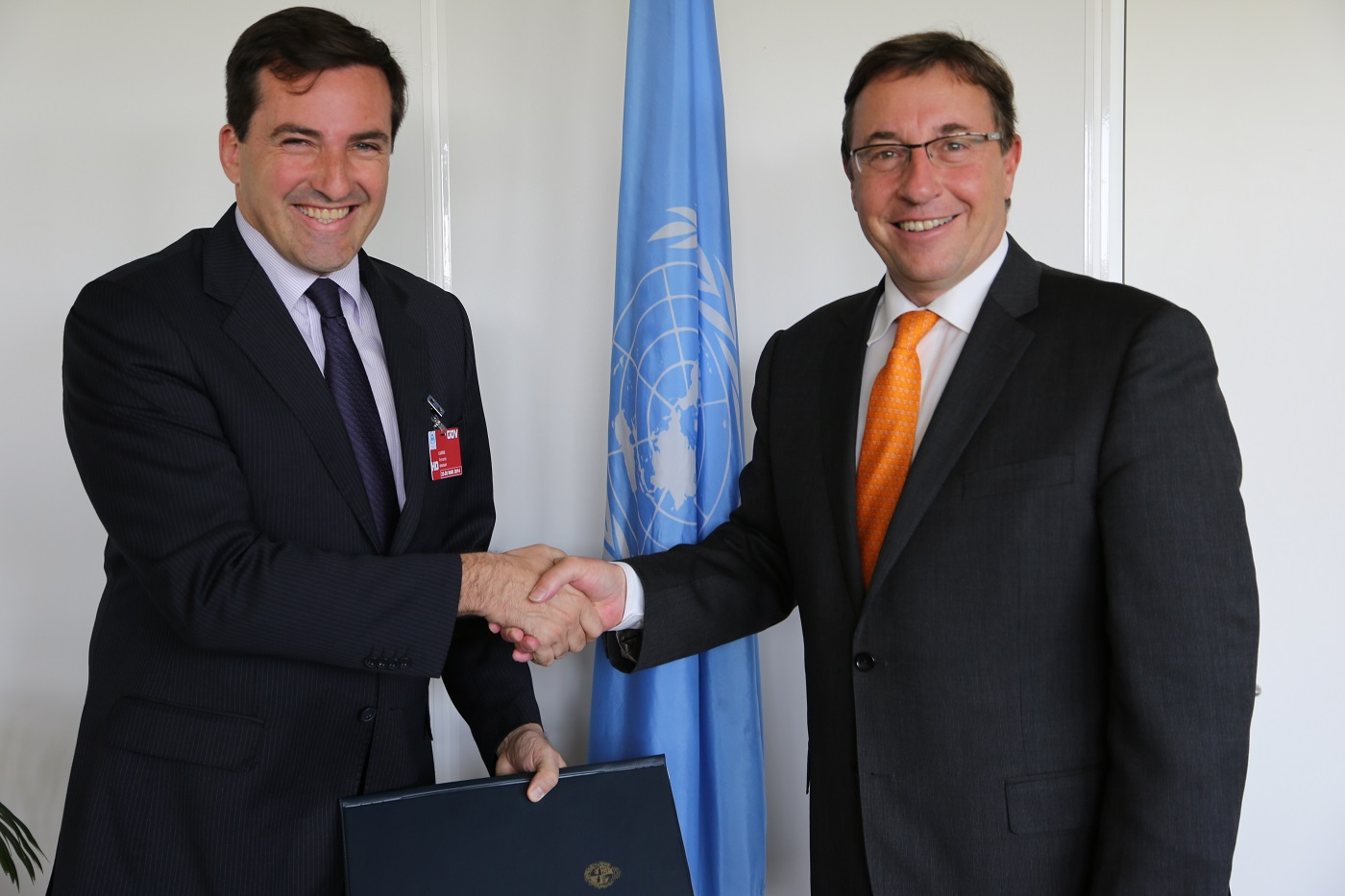
- Lugris during presentation of credentials to Mr. Achim Steiner, Executive Director, UNEP

Uruguayan Ambassador to China, Mongolia and Kyrgyzstan
- In office December 15, 2015 – June, 2025
- President: Tabaré Vázquez, Luis Lacalle Pou, Yamandú Orsi
- Preceded by: Rosario Portell
- Succeeded by: Aníbal Cabral

Permanent Representative of Uruguay to UNEP and UN-Habitat
- In office 2013–2015
- President: José Mujica
- Succeeded by: Alejandro Garofali

Personal details
- Born: December 17, 1971 (age 54) Montevideo
- Education: University of the Republic

Juan Fernando Lugris (born December 17, 1971) is an Uruguayan diplomat specialized in multilateral negotiations related to the environment, human rights, trade and regional integration, currently serving as a member of the Global Leaders Group on Antimicrobial Resistance, chaired by Barbados’ Prime Minister, H.E. Mia Amor Mottley. He was Ambassador of Uruguay to China, Mongolia and Kyrgyzstan. Lugris became the first Permanent Representative of Uruguay to UNEP and UN-Habitat and was the Chair of the Intergovernmental Negotiating Committee (INC) in charge of developing a legally binding global instrument on mercury known as the Minamata Convention on Mercury.

== Background and earlier life ==
Fernando Lugris was born on December 17, 1971, in Montevideo Uruguay. Lugris completed his bachelor's degree in international relations at the University of the Republic in Montevideo, Uruguay and later on went to study at the Presbyterian College in Clinton, South Carolina, USA; at the Foreign Service Institute in New Delhi, India. He completed his diplomatic training in 1999 at the Diplomatic Academy of Uruguay.

== Diplomatic career ==
Ambassador Lugris was designated as Ambassador Extraordinary and Plenipotentiary of Uruguay to the People's Republic of China and to the Republic of Mongolia in 2015. Before that, he went on becoming the first Permanent Representative of Uruguay to the United Nations Environment Programme (UNEP) and the United Nations Human Settlements Programme (UN-Habitat). During that time he was also designated as Deputy Director General of the Political Affairs department of the Ministry of Foreign Affairs of Uruguay.

Lugris environmental work gained widespread recognition after becoming the Chair of the Intergovernmental Negotiating Committee (INC) which led to the creation of the Minamata Convention on Mercury, an international treaty designed to protect human health and the environment from anthropogenic emissions and releases of mercury and mercury compounds.

He also became the Political Focal Point of Uruguay to the Global Environmental Facility (GEF) acting as an advisor to the Uruguayan Government during the 4th GEF and as a representative of the LAC recipient countries at the GEF5 replenishment process.

He was the National Coordinator of Uruguay of UNASUR, in charge of the Uruguayan Presidency of the South American Union of Nations.

His first post as a diplomat serving the Ministry of Foreign Affairs of Uruguay was Geneva, Switzerland, acting as a Secretary at the Permanent Mission of Uruguay to the UN and the World Trade Organization (WTO).

He was Deputy Head of Mission of the Embassy of Uruguay in Berlin, Germany.

Since October 2025 he serves as Director General for cultural affairs of Ministry of Foreign Affairs.
