= Luis Almagro =

Uruguayan lawyer, diplomat, and politician

His Excellency Luis Almagro
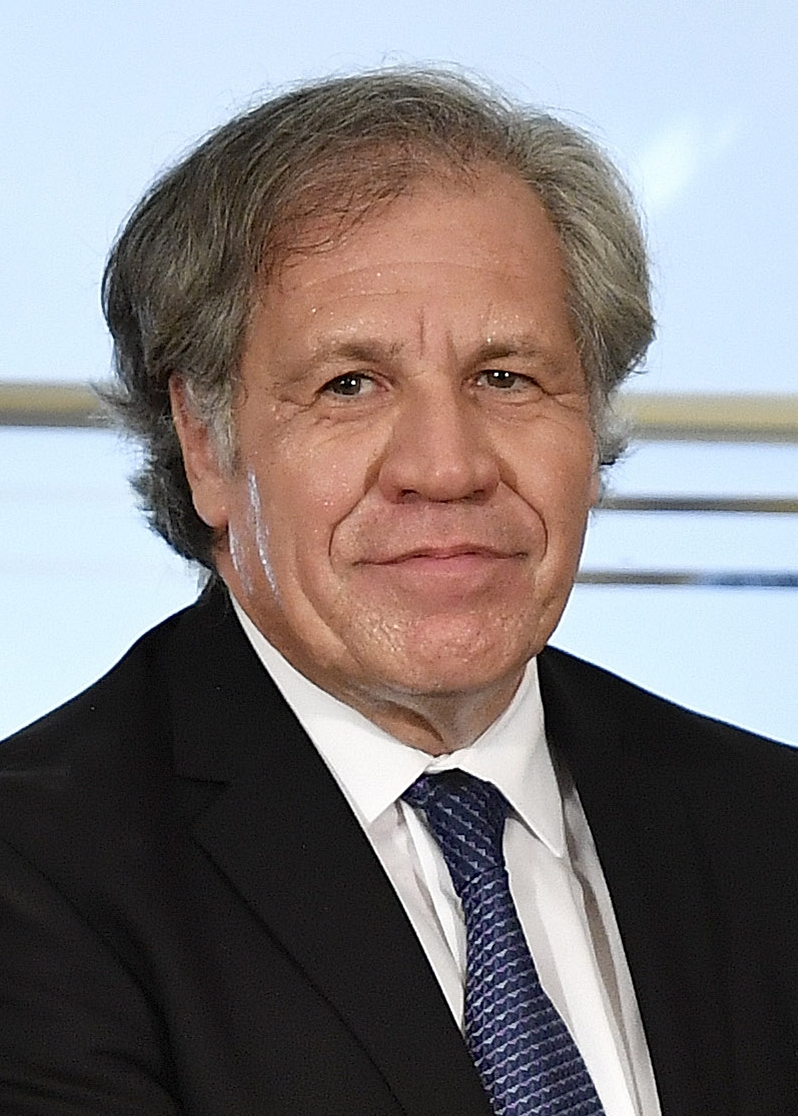
- Luis Almagro in September 2018

10th Secretary General of the Organization of American States
- In office May 26, 2015 – May 30, 2025
- Preceded by: José Miguel Insulza
- Succeeded by: Albert Ramdin

Minister of Foreign Relations of Uruguay
- In office March 1, 2010 – February 28, 2015
- President: José Mujica
- Preceded by: Pedro Vaz
- Succeeded by: Rodolfo Nin Novoa

Personal details
- Born: Luis Leonardo Almagro Lemes; June 1, 1963 (age 63) Paysandú, Uruguay
- Party: Independent (since 2018)
- Other political affiliations: Broad Front (until 2018, expelled)
- Spouse: Luisa Fernanda Marín (2024)
- Children: 7
- Education: University of the Republic

Luis Leonardo Almagro Lemes (Spanish pronunciation: [ˈlwis alˈmaɣɾo]; born June 1, 1963) is a Uruguayan lawyer, diplomat, and politician who served as the 10th Secretary General of the Organization of American States (OAS) from 2015 to 2025. A former member of the Broad Front, Almagro served as Minister of Foreign Relations of Uruguay from 2010 to 2015 under president José Mujica.

Almagro served as Uruguay's Ambassador to the People's Republic of China from 2005 to 2010. He had previously held different positions at the Ministry of Foreign Relations. After the 2009 general election, then-president-elect José Mujica appointed him foreign minister, taking office in March 2010, succeeding Pedro Vaz. During his tenure in the Mujica administration, the country received several detainees from the Guantanamo Bay detention camp and dozens of Syrian families who were civilian victims, as well as maintained a military presence in Haiti to ensure the reconstruction process after the 2010 earthquake.

After leaving government service, Almagro was elected Senator of the Republic in 2014 for the 48th Legislature and assumed his seat in March 2015, however, he resigned a few months later to take office as Secretary General of the Organization of American States (OAS). On March 20, 2020, the OAS General Assembly re-elected him in office for a second term until 2025. An election was held on 10 March to choose his successor.

== Early life and education ==
Luis Almagro was born June 1, 1963, in Cerro Chato, Paysandú Department. Almagro studied at the University of the Republic, where he earned his law degree. During his 23-year career with the Uruguayan Foreign Ministry, he represented Uruguay in the Islamic Republic of Iran (1991–1996), in Germany (1998–2003), as well as serving as Ambassador to China (2007–2010). He is fluent in Spanish, English, and French.

== Foreign Minister of Uruguay ==
During Almagro's time as Foreign Minister (2010–2015), Uruguay drew global recognition for a small South American country as they were the largest per capita contributor to UN peacekeeping forces as well as secured Uruguay's successful election seat to the UN Security Council. Almagro also supported efforts on the restoration of relations between Cuba and the US. Almagro's commitment to human rights extended to domestic affairs as demonstrated by the active role in the repeal of the 1986 Expiry Law, which granted amnesty for crimes and human rights abuses committed during the civic-military dictatorship between 1973 and 1985, and actively supported prosecutions for these crimes.

A lawyer, Almagro was a member of the executive committee that drafted the groundbreaking legislation regulating the possession, growth, and distribution of marijuana in Uruguay in 2013. Uruguay is the first country in the world to introduce legislation of its kind. He also represented Uruguay at the International Centre for Settlement of Investment Disputes (ICSID), in the suit brought by Philip Morris International against Uruguay for its anti-tobacco policies. After six years, ICSID ruled in favor of Uruguay. Also responsible for trade, Almagro also played a key role in expanding and diversifying Uruguay market access, raising exports each year of his term. A key focus was opening up non-traditional markets to Uruguayan exporters, including as securing access to key US markets for Uruguay's citrus fruit.

A strong advocate for refugees, Almagro played an integral role in negotiating the transfer of a group of ex-detenidos (former detainees) from Guantanamo Bay detention camp to Uruguay. Almagro also led the process to welcome dozens of Syrian refugees to Uruguay, along with former President Mujica. For this they were listed among Foreign Policy magazine's top Global Thinkers for 2014. Almagro is one of only 10 decision-makers in the region to be awarded this international distinction. In 2018, Almagro was listed 4th in the ranking of top 100 leaders from multilateral organizations.

== Secretary General of the OAS ==
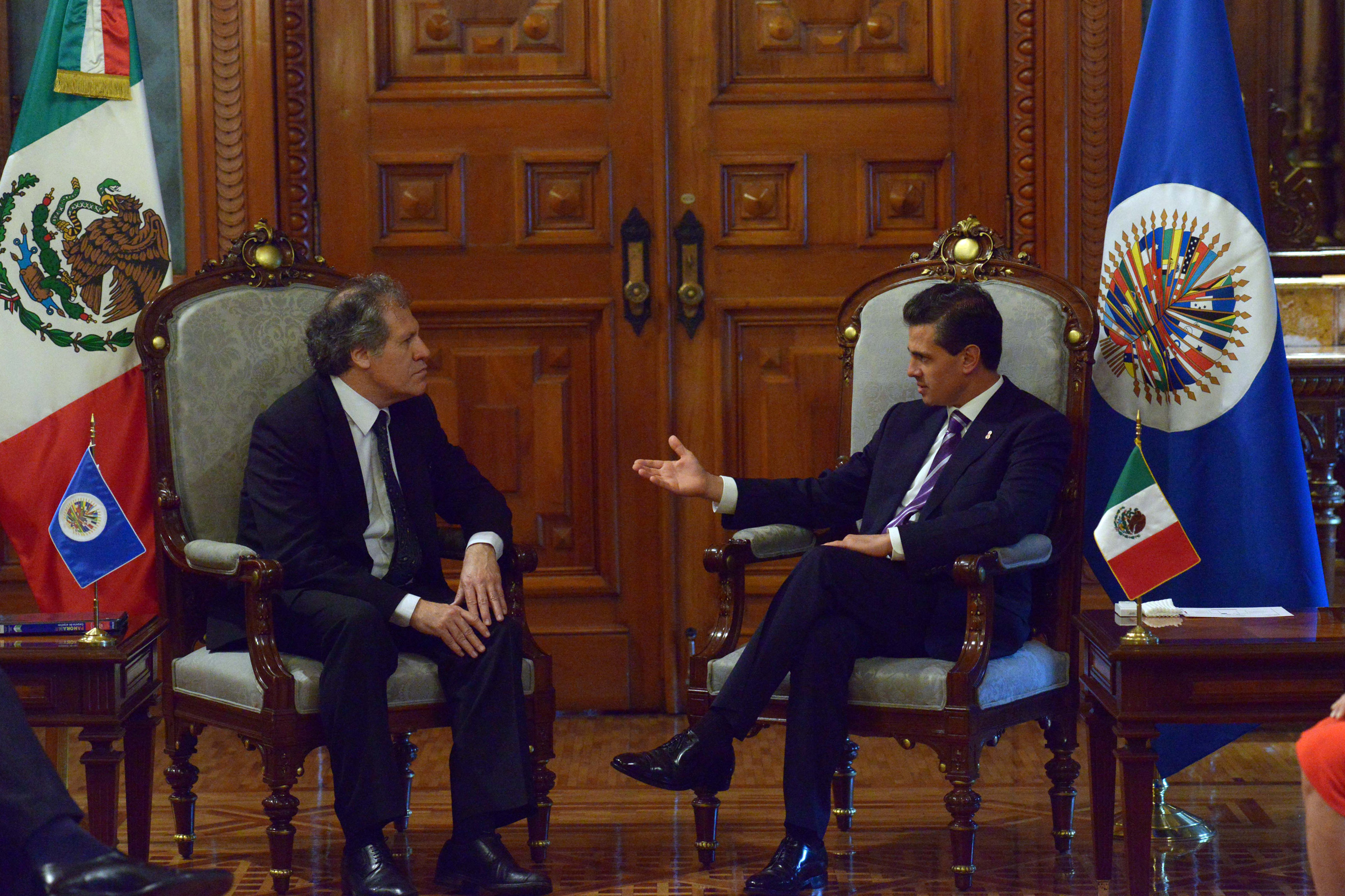
Almagro (left) with Mexican president Enrique Peña Nieto in 2015

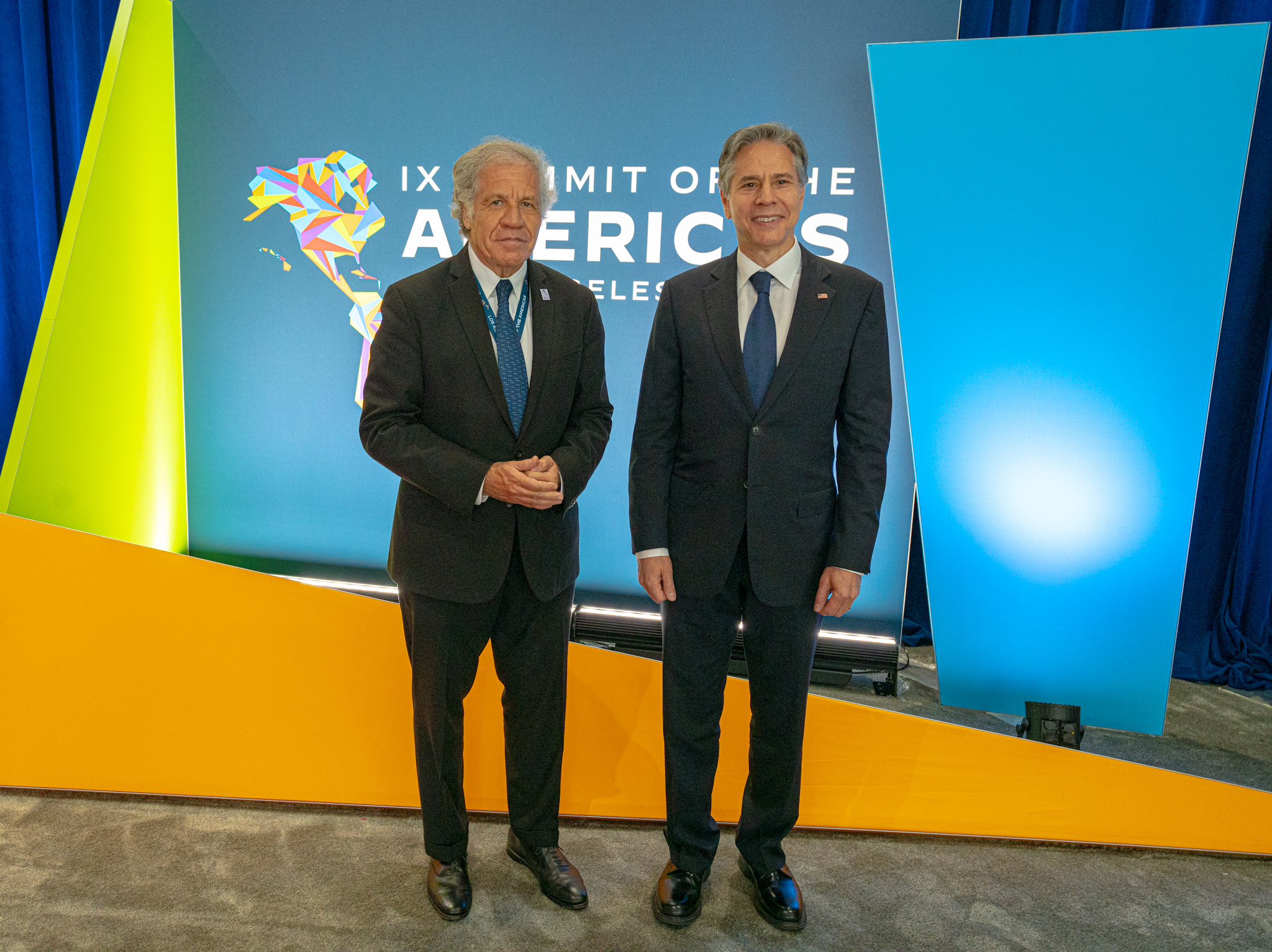
Almagro meets with US Secretary of State Antony Blinken at the 9th Summit of the Americas in 2022.

=== Election to the OAS ===
Almagro was elected Secretary General of the Organization of American States on March 18, 2015, earning the support of 33 of the 34 Members States, including one abstention. He officially took office on May 26, 2015. Almagro's first year in office was marked by his outspoken stance on democracy and human rights. His leadership has widely been seen as reinvigorating an Organization. His election campaign centered on the idea of "More Rights for More People". In addition to four programmatic pillars of democracy, human rights, security and development, he announced a set of new strategic initiatives to achieve this goal including:

- The OAS School of Governance to train civil servants and civil society with the tools for transparent and accountable government;
- The Inter-American Education System to ensure quality, inclusive, and equitable education; and
- The Regional System for the Prevention of Social Conflicts to facilitate dialogue between investors, states and communities in key productive sectors.

Under the renewed vision, Almagro continues to champion key OAS initiatives including the Inter-American Human Rights System, the Inter-American Judicial Facilitators Program, the MACCIH, and the Mission to Support the Peace Process in Colombia (MAPP), along with electoral cooperation and observation missions as priorities for the organization.

=== Regional work ===
==== Madrid Forum ====
On 3 March 2020, Santiago Abascal of the far-right Spanish political party Vox met with Almagro, with the two discussing the creation of the anti-leftist organization, the Madrid Forum. Members of the Madrid Forum again met with Almagro in March 2023, presenting the ongoing Peruvian protests as an international "destabilization campaign" against President Dina Boluarte.

==== Inter-religious dialogue ====
The initiative "Protecting our Home Common Home: Ensuring more rights for more people in the Americas" is organized through the cooperation of the OAS, the Vatican and the Inter-religious Institute for Dialogue. The inaugural meeting on September 7–8, 2016, established a Hemispheric Network of Dialogue for the Common Home which creates platform for dialogue between countries of OAS Member States and religious leaders to support reconciliation and the search for solutions to promote peace and stability, in line with Article 2 of the OAS Charter.

==== Other work ====
Almagro has given special lectures and classes at prestigious academic centers including the University of Oxford, New York University, Georgetown University, Harvard University, Syracuse University, UNAM of Mexico, University of Pennsylvania, Boston College, Cambridge University, and University of the Republic of Uruguay, among others. During the 2022 Summit of the Americas, Almagro called for a global treaty to end violence against women and girls.

=== National work ===
==== Bolivia ====
During his mandate, the OAS Electoral Observation Mission for the 2019 presidential elections in Bolivia denounced irregularities in the process. In agreement with the Bolivian government, the OAS conducted an audit of the electoral process, whose preliminary report dated November 10, 2019 denounced "irregularities, ranging from very serious to indicative", which led the technical audit team to "question the integrity of the election results". On November 10, Almagro called for the election to be annulled and for new elections to be called, a process during which he assured "it is understood that constitutional mandates should not be interrupted, including that of President Evo Morales." The final report of the audit, published on December 4, concluded that there was “fraudulent manipulation” and “serious irregularities” that made it impossible to validate the results originally issued by the Bolivian electoral authorities. The European Union, which also sent an Electoral Observation Mission to the October 2019 elections in Bolivia, reached similar conclusions in its final report. In 2022, and in compliance with a mandate from the United States Congress, the US State Department prepared a report on Bolivia's electoral process in 2019, which ratified the findings of the OAS and EU missions.

==== Guatemala ====
Almagro and the OAS played a central role in ensuring that Bernardo Arévalo assumed the presidency of Guatemala in January 2024, after his victory in the 2023 general elections, as highlighted by President Arévalo himself in his speech at a formal session of the Permanent Council of the Organization on March 26, 2024: "During 2023, this Organization played a fundamental role in catalyzing global support for the struggle of the people of Guatemala to assert their sovereignty." The Ambassador of Antigua and Barbuda to the United States and the Organization of American States, Sir Ronald Sanders stated that "undoubtedly, had the OAS and its Secretary General Luis Almagro, supported by key member states of the Permanent Council, not played an active role as mediator, negotiator, and influencer, Guatemala would currently face a constitutional crisis and civil unrest."

==== Cuba ====
On December 7, 2018, under the leadership of Secretary General Almagro, the OAS hosted the first Conference on the Situation of Human Rights in Cuba since the 2009 Resolution lifting Cuba's suspension from the Organization. The conference included dialogue on the criminality of freedom of Expression in Cuba, as well as the situation of political prisoners and accountability for repressors in the country.

==== Haiti ====
Following the suspension of the second round of presidential elections on January 24, 2016, President Michel Martelly requested assistance from OAS Secretary General Almagro to facilitate a discussion on finding a way forward. On January 29, an OAS Special Mission travelled to Haiti to assess the situation and help reach an understanding "agreed by Haitians." The Mission engaged in dialogue with key political and civil society stakeholders facilitating a consensus formula for next steps. On February 6, 2016, former President Martelly announced a transitional agreement electing an interim President and confirming a consensus Prime Minister. After the completion of the Mission, the Representative of Haiti to the OAS, Jean Josué Pierre, applauded the OAS, stating that "the Mission not only supported and accompanied the negotiations, but has reestablished the image of the Organization." Almagro has been critical of the slow progress to resolve the political impasse; "It is imperative for Haitian political stakeholders, including Parliamentarians and those provisionally governing the country, to fully assume their responsibilities towards the nation. The interests of the Haitian people must supersede partisan interests."

==== Honduras ====
Anticorruption has been a focus from the outset of Secretary Almagro's term. In the spring of 2015, widespread protests erupted when a multi-million corruption scandal involving the Honduran social security system was uncovered by the local media. In August 2015, Honduran President Juan Orlando Hernández invited Secretary General Almagro to Honduras to facilitate a dialogue and response to the protests. Almagro met with government representatives, political parties and civil society on how to end impunity and repair trust between the country's government and its citizens. On January 19, 2016, Secretary General Almagro and the Government of Honduras signed an agreement creating the OAS Mission to Support the Fight against Corruption and Impunity in Honduras (MACCIH). The MACCIH created an international anti-corruption team of investigators and judges to work with Honduran judges, prosecutors and police officers to better investigate and prosecute complex public corruption cases. While the Mission's focus is to investigate cases involving networks of public and private corruption, it will also support reform in four key areas: preventing and fighting corruption, criminal justice reform, political and electoral reform and public security. The first members of the MACCIH arrived in Honduras in April 2016. In January 2020, the Honduran government dissolved MACCIH after OAS negotiators were unable to secure an agreement with it to renew the body's mandate.

==== Nicaragua ====
Led by Almagro, the General Secretariat of the OAS activated different diplomatic and denouncing mechanisms to expose the serious situation that the Central American country faces. A project of electoral reforms was agreed between the General Secretariat of the OAS and the government early in 2017 with the objective of strengthening democratic institutions. While the agreement is currently on hold given the ongoing crisis, Secretary Almagro remains a staunch supporter of mechanisms that would allow for redemocratization, and to achieve justice for the hundreds of Nicaraguan victims. In this context, his good offices made possible the first visit on-site visit of the Inter American Human Rights Commission (CIDH, by its initials in Spanish) in many years, and he approved the creation of the Interdisciplinary Group of Independent Experts (GIEI, by its initials in Spanish) to seek truth and help investigate the crimes committed. Facing an attitude of denial from the government, in December 2018 he announced the activation of article 20 of the Inter American Democratic Charter for Nicaragua.

==== Venezuela ====
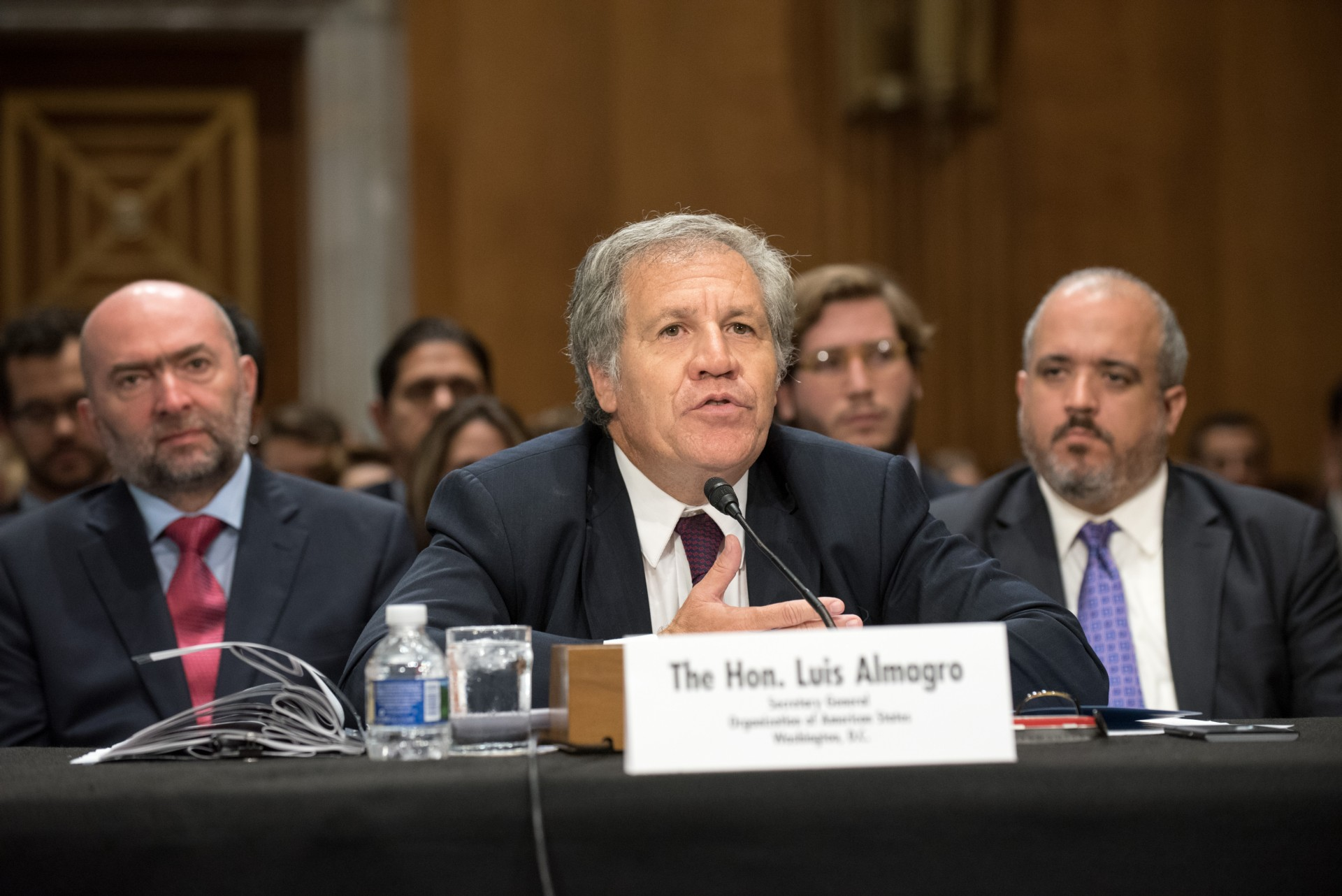
Almagro testifies to the United States Senate Committee on Foreign Relations on Venezuela on 19 July 2017.

In the lead up to the December 2015 parliamentary elections in Venezuela, Secretary General Almagro sent an 18-page open letter to the president of that country's National Electoral Council (CNE) in which he publicly denounced “the Government's violations of human rights and efforts to undermine the December 2015 elections through the monopolization of the media, interference in the election process, oppression of free assembly and the detention of political prisoners″. The letter represented the first open criticism of the Venezuelan government by a senior diplomat from the region.

As the situation in Venezuela deteriorated dramatically after the December elections, in June 2016, Secretary General Almagro released a 114-page report detailing the deteriorating economic situation and humanitarian crisis. Under article 20, the Secretary General invoked the Inter-American Democratic Charter on the grounds that Venezuela has experienced "an alteration of the constitutional order". Key recommendations from the report include the immediate release of all political prisoners; implementation of the constitutionally mandated recall referendum before the end of 2016; a return to the balance of powers between the Judicial, Executive, and Legislative branches of government; a bi-partisan review of judicial appointments; and, the establishment of an independent body to combat corruption.

The Secretary General continues to lead the international community in advocating publicly on behalf of political prisoners and for a return to the constitutional order in Venezuela. On September 23, Almagro expressed dismay at the rules and timetable published by the CNE that further delayed the recall process into 2016, guaranteeing that the ruling party remains in power until the end of the term in 2019. "The recall referendum belongs to the people, and it is up to the CNE to ensure the guarantees for the free expression of the people, instead of curtailing and trying to annul their rights."

As the situation in Venezuela worsened, on March 14, 2017, the Secretary General presented an Updated Report on the Situation in Venezuela, outlining the further deterioration of the conditions in the country, stating that there had been a complete rupture of the democratic order. In the wake of the violent protests during the summer of 2017, the Secretary General published a Third Report on the Situation in Venezuela. In this Report, the Secretary General stated that there was “evidence that pointed to the systematic, tactical and strategic use of murder, imprisonment, torture, rape and other forms of sexual violence” are part of a targeted campaign and systemic policy against those who opposed the government. The OAS General Secretariat was tasked with monitoring further developments in Venezuela and to “specifically look at the individuals and institutions that directly or indirectly enable the use of these repressive tactics and tools” to determine whether crimes against humanity have taken place. A Fourth Report was published detailing the complete elimination of democracy following the establishment of the unconstitutional “National Constituents Assembly” in September 2017.

In July 2017, Secretary General Luis Almagro appointed former International Criminal Court (ICC) Prosecutor, Luis Moreno Ocampo as a Special Advisor on Crimes Against Humanity. In this position, Ocampo helped to define and launch an independent and impartial process to assess whether crimes against humanity have taken place in Venezuela. In September 2017, a Panel of Independent International Experts was established to oversee the process including a series of public hearings that were held at OAS Headquarters in Washington, DC in September, October, and November of that year. In May 2018, the Panel of Independent Experts released their report indicating that there are reasonable grounds that satisfy the burden of proof required by Article 52 of the Rome Statue, to believe that crimes against humanity had taken place in Venezuela. Shortly after, Secretary General Almagro formally submitted the Report to the Prosecutor of the International Criminal Court, Fatou Bensouda, requesting that the Prosecutor open a full investigation into the situation on an urgent basis.

During subsequent months, the Secretary General worked diligently to identify a coalition of countries to take the historic step of invoking Article 14 of the Rome Statute and refer the situation in Venezuela to the ICC. On September 26, 2018, Argentina, Canada, Chile, Colombia, Paraguay and Peru formally submitted the Article 14 referral to the Prosecutor of the International Criminal Court. The Secretary General has called upon the international community to consider using all mechanisms available in international law to protect the rights of Venezuelans. This includes, but is not limited to, responsibility to protect and international humanitarian law. On October 12, 2017, the newly elected Supreme Tribunal of Justice, were sworn in the OAS Headquarters. The 33 magistrates, elected by the National Assembly in July 2017, were forced to take office in exile due to political persecution, intimidation and threats of being detained by the Maduro dictatorship.

As the number of Venezuelans fleeing their country reached precedent-setting numbers, in September 2018, Secretary General Almagro established the Working Group on Crisis of Venezuelan Migrants and Refugees of the OAS, chaired by David Smolansky, to provide “solutions to the exodus of the Venezuelan people – the most visible face of the humanitarian crisis in Venezuela – who can today be found walking through the cities and towns of the Americas looking for the bread they cannot get in their own homeland." Due to his line regarding the Venezuelan crisis, Almagro was expelled by the Broad Front party in Uruguay for "colluding with US imperialism".

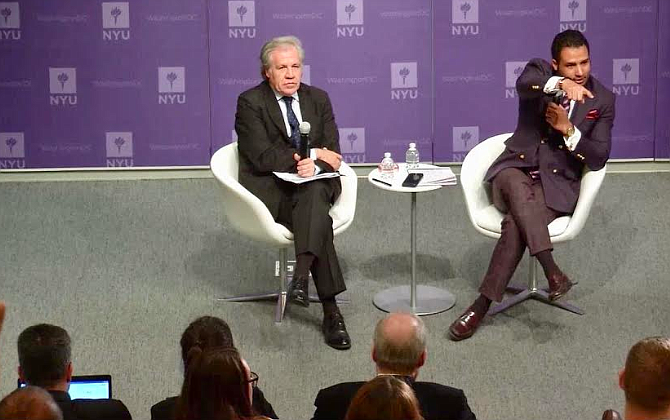
Secretary General of the Organization of American States, H.E. Luis Almagro (left), during a discussion at the NYU DC Dialogues while conversed with CNN columnist Geovanny Vicente Romero who moderated the conversation, on April 24, 2019

=== Ethics breaches ===
In October 2022, it was revealed that Almagro had engaged in a consensual romantic relationship with an OAS employee who served as his advisor. An external investigation concluded in April 2023 that "the Secretary General did not violate OAS rules and regulations regarding obligations of (i) oversight; (ii) salary increases; (iii) intimidation; (iv) travel; or conflicts of interest." The independent investigation noted that he "did not engage in serious misconduct".

=== International Conflicts ===
==== Ukraine-Russia War ====
On February 24, 2022, Almagro condemned the Russian Federation's invasion of Ukraine and called for an immediate cessation of the hostilities that it has irresponsibly initiated. On April 21, 2022, the Permanent Council of the Organization of American States suspended Russia as a permanent observer to the OAS. On September 23, 2024, Ukraine's President Volodymyr Zelenskyy bestowed Almagro with the Order of Merit, First Class "for outstanding personal contribution into strengthening interstate cooperation, supporting state sovereignty and territorial integrity of Ukraine".

==== Israel-Hamas War ====
When Hamas, a Palestinian armed group in the Gaza Strip, attacked Israel on October 7, 2023, Almagro immediately condemned the "terrorist attack" and stated that Israel has the right to defend itself. Almagro further called on the "Palestinian Authority to put an end to this aggression" and called Hamas's actions of targeting civilian populations as "an act that violates human rights and international law". On the one year anniversary since Hamas' attack on Israel, Almagro said the release and return of the hostages held by Hamas has become imperative, "just as it is imperative that Hamas' terrorism and the death it sows never strike our lives again." After meeting with families of Israeli hostages kidnapped by Hamas in November 2024, Almagro stated that "Our commitment to Peace must require that we, first of all, demand the release of the hostages, because their kidnapping has caused the war and their release will stop the war."

== Awards ==
=== 2024 ===
- On August 8, 2024, in Florida, the Mayor of the City of Doral, Christi Fraga and Councilman Rafael Piñeyro declared August 8 as “Dr. Luis Almagro Day” for his representation as “a figure who has constantly defended democracy and freedom.”
- On September 23, 2024, Ukraine's President Volodymyr Zelenskyy bestowed Almagro with the Order of Merit, First Class "for outstanding personal contribution into strengthening interstate cooperation, supporting state sovereignty and territorial integrity of Ukraine".
- In September 2024, Almagro received an award from the Development Bank of Latin America and the Caribbean in recognition of his collaborative work with the Bank.
- At the VI Annual Meeting of Youth and Democracy in the Americas, held at the OAS in November 2024, Almagro received the “Champions of Freedom Award” for his “commitment and support to strengthening democracy in the Western Hemisphere.”

=== 2023 ===
- Medal of Honor, awarded by the World Jurist Association in 2023

=== 2022 ===
- COA Chairman's Award for Leadership in the Americas, awarded by the 52nd Washington Conference on the Americas (Council of the Americas, COA)

=== 2019 ===
- “Freedom Flame of Expression” Award by the Center for the Study of Regulations in Telecommunications in Latin America (CERTAL).
- Americas Society Gold Medal.
- AJC Champion of Democracy Award by American Jewish Committee (AJC).
- CHLI Ileana Ros-Lehtinen International Leadership Award by Congressional Hispanic Leadership Institute (CHLI).
- Global Equality Champion por el Human Rights Campaign.
- Romulo Betancourt Prize for Democratic Diplomacy por el Human Rights Foundation.
- Honorary Membership Rotary Club Bethesda-Chevy Chase, by Rotary International, April 2019.

=== 2018 ===
- 16 de marzo -Recibió el VIII Premio FAES de la Libertad. En honor a la labor de defensa de los valores y la democracia que lleva a cabo el Secretario General de la OEA en América Latina. (España).
- 12 de abril - Alas de Libertad, Red Liberal de America Latina (RELIAL), in recognition for inspiring others to fight for liberty (WDC)
- 8 de mayo - Premio al Liderazgo Global 2018 de @YOA_Orchestra (WDC)
- 15 de mayo - Legislatura de la Ciudad Autónoma de Buenos Aires lo designa “Turista distinguido”, en el marco de su participación en el G20 Cumbre del Consumidor. (Buenos Aires).
- 20 de julio - Recibe las llaves de la ciudad de Medley (Florida).
- 9 de agosto - Recibe la distinción “Referente de la humanidad” por parte de la fundación @FJovenesLideres. (Buenos Aires).
- 25 de agosto - Recibe la llaves de la ciudad de Miami de manos del Comisionado de Distrito, Wifredo Gort, en evento organizado por la Cámara de Comercio Uruguayo-Americana. (Florida).
- 8 de septiembre - Recibe premio de la XV Cumbre Latinoamericana de Marketing Político y Gobernanza en Miami. @cumbre_latino. Se lo dedica a todas las víctimas de abusos de DDHH y de las dictaduras que hay en el hemisferio.

=== 2017 ===
- The Oswaldo Paya Prize, which he should have accepted from Rosa María Payá, Director of the Red Latinoamericana de Jóvenes por la Democracia on February 22 in Havana, Cuba. However, this was not possible because the Cuban government itself prevented him from traveling to Cuba to accept the award.
- The Rómulo Betancourt Order of Venezuelan Exile, which he accepted in Doral, Florida, on April 13 from the organization Venezolanos Perseguidos Políticos en el Exilio.
- An award during the XIV Latin American Political Consulting and Governance Summiton April 13 on the Wolfson Campus of Miami Dade College in Florida for his work in defense of democracy and liberty on the continent.
- The Freedom Award from Freedom House, which he received on April 27 in recognition of his work on behalf of Venezuelan political prisoners.
- Charles T. Manatt Democracy Award, received on October 2 from the International Foundation for Electoral Systems.
- The Francisco de Miranda Award, received on October 27 for his work defending freedom in the region.
- Press Freedom Grand Priz from the Inter-American Press Association, received on October 28. The president of the IAPA, Matt Sanders, said Mr. Almagro received the Prize “for his invaluable defense and promotion of freedom of expression and of the press as the very essence of democracy, as is recognized by the Inter-American Democratic Charter.”
- World Peace & Liberty Award from the World Jurist Association, received on October 31
- Honorary doctorate from the University of San Martín de Porres, Lima, Peru, on December 7, 2017, for his work to revitalize the OAS, his fight for democracy, and his flagship policy: More rights for more people.
- 4th place in the Top 100 Leaders List from Multilateral Organisations by Richtopia.

=== 2016 ===
- In Canada he was named one of the 10 most influential Hispanic people, an award that the Canadian Hispanic Business Alliance has given out for the past 10 years.
- He received the Oswaldo Payá Liberty and Life Prize for his “outstanding efforts in defense of democracy.” The Latin American Youth Network for Democracy announced that Mr. Almagro was awarded the prize for “his coherent response to the political and social junctures through which certain countries experiencing crisis and democratic regression in Latin America are traversing.” The award is given to people or institutions who have stood out for their effective promotion and defense of human rights, life, and democracy.
- Secretary General Almagro also received an award from the Inter-American Institute for Democracy (IID). Headed by Carlos Alberto Montaner, the IID chose Mr. Almagro as the winner of the 2016 Francisco Miranda Prize for his committed “defense of liberty and democracy in the Americas.”
- The Secretary General was also selected to receive one of the awards bestowed annually by the Ibero-American Association of Communication (ASICOM) at a ceremony in the Paraninfo Hall at the University of Oviedo, Spain. Sergio Jellinek, the Secretary General's strategic communications adviser, received the award on his behalf.
- The Secretary General was awarded the 2016 Mark Palmer Prize, which the Community of Democracies gives to diplomats or international officials in recognition of their work to strengthen democracy and promote human rights.
- He was also the recipient of the TIC-Americas 2016 “Entrepreneur of the Year” Award granted by the Young American Business Trust in June 2016.

=== 2014 ===
- H prize Secretary General Luis Almagro was granted this distinction by Uruguayan civil society groups in recognition of his firm defense of the rights of the gay, lesbian, bisexual and transgender persons, both at national level and international level, including on behalf of Uruguay in the various international bodies and organizations of which it is a Member.
- Foreign Policy Magazine Global Thinker.
