= World Peace & Liberty Award =

American legal award

- Location: United States
- Presented by: World Jurist Association
- First award: 1965

Highlights
- Total: 8 (to 2023)

The World Peace & Liberty Award is a recognition granted since 1965 by the World Jurist Association, recognizing outstanding world personalities for their role in the defense of the Rule of Law in opposition to the use of force.

== History and development ==
The award is intrinsically linked to the history of the World Jurist Association. In the early 1960s, during the Cold War years, judges, lawyers, law professors and other legal professionals were demanding the organization of an open and free forum to work strengthening and disseminating the importance of the Rule of Law and its institutions around the world. In 1963, the World peace Through Law Center of the American Bar Association (today World Jurist Association), with the initial encouragement of Winston Churchill, Earl Warren and Charles S. Rhyne, President of the American Bar Association. Following its creation, the organization first awarded the World Peace & Liberty Award in 1965 to Sir Winston Churchill.

The next recipients of the award were René Cassin, main drafter of the Universal Declaration of Human Rights, in 1972; and Nelson Mandela, who received it in 1997, during the World Jurist Association conference celebrated in Cape Town, South Africa.

In 2019, the prize was awarded to King Felipe VI of Spain for his role in defending the rule of law in the face of the Catalan independence challenge. It was presented during the closing ceremony of the World Law Congress in Madrid.

Ruth Bader Ginsburg, Justice of the US Supreme Court, was awarded the prize in 2020 for her defense of gender equality and civil rights. The ceremony was held at the headquarters of the American Bar Association in Washington, D.C.

In 2021 it was awarded to "Colombian Society" (Sociedad Colombiana) on the 30th anniversary of its democratic constitution, received by its then president Iván Duque Márquez.

In 2023, the award was granted to Andrew Young, former mayor of Atlanta for his role as a leader in the civil rights struggle and part of the contemporary history of the United States and the world in his fight for human rights.

Also in 2023, the award was granted to the President of the European Commission, Ursula von der Leyen.

In 2025, Sonia Sotomayor received this award in recognition of her impeccable judicial work and her efforts to uphold and apply the law even in difficult circumstances.

Recipients:

- 1965: Winston Churchill
- 1972: Rene Cassin
- 1997: Nelson Mandela
- 2017: Luis Almagro
- 2019: Felipe VI of Spain
- 2020: Ruth Bader Ginsburg
- 2021: Columbian society
- May 2023: Andrew Young
- July 2023: Ursula von der Leyen, president of the European Commission.
- May 2025: Sonia Sotomayor, U.S. Supreme Court Justice

== Related links ==
- World Jurist Association
- World Law Foundation
