= International Association of Jewish Lawyers and Jurists =

Israeli non-governmental organization

- Type: Bar association
- Region served: World

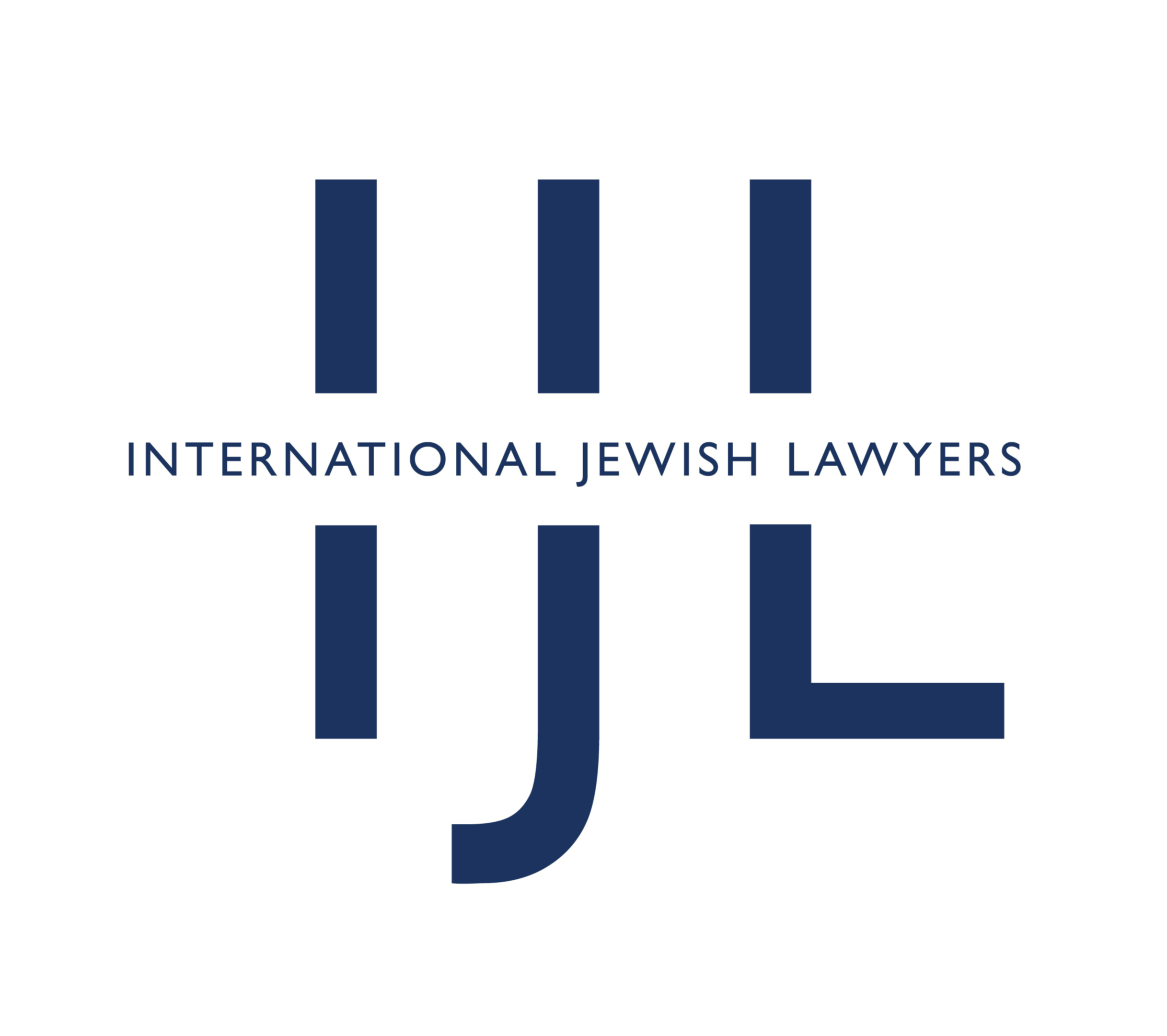
Logo of the IJL

The International Association of Jewish Lawyers and Jurists (IJL) strives to advance human rights everywhere, including the prevention of war crimes, the punishment of war criminals, the prohibition of weapons of mass destruction, and international co-operation based on the rule of law and the fair implementation of international covenants and conventions.

The association is especially committed to issues that are on the agenda of the Jewish people, and works to combat racism, xenophobia, antisemitism, Holocaust denial and negation of the State of Israel. IJL was founded in 1969. Among its founders were Haim Cohn, Attorney General of Israel, Arthur Goldberg, associate justice of the Supreme Court of the United States, and Nobel Peace Prize laureate René Cassin of France. Membership comprises lawyers, judges, judicial officers and academic jurists who are active locally and internationally as the need arises. Membership is open to lawyers and jurists of all creeds who share the organization's aims.

The IJL has an ECOSOC Special Consultative status as a non-governmental organization (NGO) at the United Nations, enabling it to participate in the deliberations of various UN bodies. In this capacity, the representatives of the IJL have been especially involved in the work of the United Nations Human Rights Committee in Geneva and of related bodies.

The Association also publishes Justice Magazine which examines a variety of relevant issues and current topics and is mailed to thousands of lawyers and jurists throughout the world.

Members of the Executive Committee, the Board and the President of the IJL serve on a voluntary basis.

The current president is Adv. Meir Linzen.

== The Legal Center for Combating Antisemitism ==
Headed by Adv. Avraham (Avrumi) Yishai, The Legal Center for Combating Antisemitism was established in 2019, in response to the rise of antisemitism worldwide and the need to take drastic measures against this development.

The center's main goal, as identified by Adv. Meir Linzen, the president of IJL, is "To be the legal arm of the Jewish people" and to bring to justice anyone who dares to spread hatred in any form against Jews.

Part of the center's purpose is to foster the growth of a vibrant community from all over the world by joining forces in reporting and fighting hostility against Jews no matter where they are located.

== United Nations ==
The IJL has an ECOSOC Special Consultative status as a non-governmental organization (NGO) at the United Nations, enabling it to participate in the deliberations of various UN bodies. In this capacity, the representatives of the IJL have been especially involved in the work of the Human Rights Committee in Geneva and of related bodies.

== Presidents of IJL (1969–present) ==
Hadassa Ben-Itto (1926-2018)

Judge Hadassa Ben-Itto served as Deputy Chief Judge on the District Court of Tel Aviv-Yafo, and she sat for a period on the Israel Supreme court. Ben-Itto decided to retire from the bench a few years prior to the official retirement age in order to conduct comprehensive research and write a book outlining the story of the infamous forgery "The Protocols of the Elders of Zion"—a fabricated antisemitic text purporting to describe a Jewish plan for global domination. Judge Ben-Itto's book has been translated into ten languages, and it is sold worldwide.

Ben-Itto served as the President of IJL from 1988 to 2004. In this position, Ben-Itto took an activist line, exposing and condemning manifestations of antisemitism, and undertaking legal battles against Holocaust deniers. It was her view that limitations need to be imposed on freedom of expression in cases of blatant racial incitement. She fulfilled this responsibility with much devotion and great dedication.

In recognition of her activity, Ben-Itto was awarded an honorary doctorate by Bar Ilan University, as well as the Chaim Herzog Prize, the Zeltner Prize, the Tel Aviv Worthy Citizen Award, and other accolades. In 2004 she was elected IJL's Honorary President.

Adv. Alex Hertman

Adv. Alex Hertman served as President of IJL from 2004 to 2011. During his presidency, IJL took part in legal actions against bodies that funded and supported terrorist groups. Under Hertman's leadership, IJL was involved in lawsuits against Iran and its president, Mahmoud Ahmadinejad, who called for Israel's destruction. Also, IJL was then involved in advocating for Israel in international and national forums and in preventing and countering arrests and legal proceedings against Israeli officials in Spain and the UK. Hertman promoted the establishment of IJL's branch in Buenos Aires, Argentina, and together with members from the IJL's office in Buenos Aires, worked to bring to justice Iranian officials who had planned the terrorist attacks on the Israeli embassy in 1992 and the Jewish community building (AMIA) in 1994, in Buenos Aires.

Furthermore, during Hertman's presidency, IJL organized conferences in London and in Madrid, showcasing Israel's separate and independent legal system and Israel's proportional and necessary military actions. Additionally, IJL worked to commemorate the many Hungarian Jewish lawyers and jurists who were not allowed to practice law and later were murdered, because they were Jewish, during the Second World War. Together with Yad Vashem, IJL organized a special ceremony in Hungary, with the participation of leading officials from Hungary's legal system, to commemorate the life of Hungarian Jews murdered in the Holocaust. Hertman is currently a senior partner in S. Horowitz & Co, Law Office.

Adv. Irit Kohn

Adv. Irit Kohn served as President of IJL from 2010 to 2017. Before that, she was Director of the Department of International Affairs, Office of the Israel State Attorney. During that time, she was responsible for representing Israel on international criminal issues. As IJL President, Kohn managed many public and legal activities against antisemitism, human rights violations and denial of the State of Israel. In one of her appearances at the UN Human Rights Council, she fought claims that falsely accused Israel of stealing organs from dead Palestinians during the 2006 Second Lebanon War. During her presidency, Kohn strove to ensure that IJL continue its efforts to tackle human rights abuses not only against Jews but also against other minorities. She also organized many IJL international conferences, with the participation of hundreds of Jewish lawyers and jurists from all over the world.

== Founding members ==
René Cassin (1887 – 1976)

A jurist, humanitarian, and internationalist, René Cassin was one of the world's foremost proponents of the legal as well as the moral recognition of the rights of man. He received the Nobel Peace Prize in 1968 for his work in drafting the Universal Declaration of Human Rights. Cassin was born in Bayonne, France, to a French-Jewish merchant. He forged his career in law as a practitioner, professor, scholar, administrator, and promoter of human rights. Cassin occupied high posts in the judicial systems of France and Europe.

Haim Cohn (1911 - 2002)

Haim Cohn was born in Lübeck, Germany in 1911. He emigrated to Palestine in 1933 due to the rise of Nazism in Germany. After the establishment of the State of Israel in 1948, he was appointed as manager of the legislation department of the Ministry of Justice and later became State Attorney. In 1949, he was made CEO of the Ministry of Justice and Attorney General of Israel a year later. In 1952, he was chosen as the Minister of Justice, and in 1960, he was appointed to the Supreme Court of Israel. In addition to his civil service, he served as a representative of Israel in the United Nations Human Rights Council and as a member of the International Court of Justice in the Hague.

Arthur Joseph Goldberg (1908 – 1990)

Arthur Goldberg was born in 1908 to Russian-Jewish parents on Chicago's west side and was the youngest of 11 children. Goldberg graduated from Northwestern University School of Law in 1930. He later became a prominent labor attorney. In 1961, President John F. Kennedy appointed Goldberg as Secretary of Labor and successfully nominated him to the Supreme Court one year later. In 1965, Goldberg resigned from the bench to accept an appointment by President Lyndon B. Johnson to become the Ambassador to the United Nations. In that role, he helped draft UN Security Council Resolution 242* (1967) in the aftermath of the Six-Day War. UN Security Council Resolution 242 has been the pivotal point of reference in all Arab-Israeli diplomacy since 1967. It established the basis of Israel's legal right to defensible borders.
