= World Jurist Association =

International non-governmental organisation

The World Jurist Association (WJA), formerly known as the World Peace Through Law Center, is a non-governmental organization based in the United States that aims to strengthen and increase the rule of law around the world through cooperation. It has special consultative status at the United Nations Economic and Social Council. It organises conferences and congresses, including the World Law Congress, held in different countries each year. It also awards various medals, including the World Peace & Liberty Awards and the Ruth Bader Ginsburg Medals of Honor. As of January 2025 Spanish lawyer Javier Cremades is president of the WJA.

== History ==
The World Peace Through Law Center (also cited as the Centre for World Peace Through Law) was established in 1963 in response to international calls by judges, lawyers, law academics, and other legal professionals for a free and open forum in which to work together to strengthen and expand the rule of law and its institutions globally. It was established at the first World Law Congress, held in Athens, Greece, in June/July 1963, chaired by founding president Charles S. Rhyne. It was co-founded by American lawyer and politician Earl Warren.

In 2000, the Bulletin of the WJA, published since its foundation year, was titled The World Jurist: Bulletin of the World Jurist Association of the World Peace through Law Center.

The World Peace Through Law Center became absorbed into the World Jurist Association, abbreviated as WJA.

== Aims ==
The WJA is based on cooperation among its members, to work collaboratively to strengthen and expand the rule of law and its institutions globally. Members and congress attendees aim to share not only technical knowledge but, most importantly, according to president Javier Cremades, "a vision of the world based on one idea: stable peace can only be achieved through law". The WJA plays a role in preserving freedoms and human dignity, and counteracting violence and disorder.

Destabilising influences have been increasingly coming from within countries rather than outside, caused by disruptive agents and sometimes even the authorities.

== Governance and people ==
The WJA is a non-governmental organization based in Washington, D.C.

The founding president of the WJA was Charles S. Rhyne, and Earl Warren was a co-founder. Ved P. Nanda (US), Lucio Ghia (Italy), and Raul G. Goco (Philippines) were presidents before 2000, remaining honorary president of the organization as of that year. Charles S. Rhyne remained honorary life president. In 2000, Daniel J. Monaco was president. There were also a number of honorary presidents, including Itzhak Nener (Israel) and Mohammed L Uwais (Nigeria). Each continent had a president.

Javier Cremades was elected president of the WJA in February 2019, the first Spaniard to hold the position. As of 2023 is president of both the World Jurist Association and the World Law Foundation.

The World Law Foundation, established at the World Law Congress held in 2019 and based in Madrid, Spain, serves as the executive branch of the WJA.

== Conferences ==
=== World Law Congress ===
The World Law Congress is a biennial congress held since 1963, although some years have been missed since 2005.

In February 2019, the congress was held in Madrid, Spain, under the slogan "Constitution, Democracy and Liberty". It addressed several topics, including the relationship between democracy and the constitution; parliamentary monarchies or the rule of law; and the reaffirmation of peace through the mechanisms of law.

In 2023, the congress was held in New York City.

The 2025 congress was held in Santo Domingo, Dominican Republic, in May 2025.

== Awards ==
=== World Peace & Liberty Award ===
The World Peace & Liberty Award is the WJA's highest honor, and is not awarded every year. The award has been given to Winston Churchill (1964), René Cassin (1967), Nelson Mandela (1997), and Luis Almagro Lemes (2017).

In 2019, the Peace & Liberty Award was presented at the World Law Congress to King Felipe VI of Spain for his response to the sovereignty challenge in Catalonia.

In 2020, it was awarded to US Supreme Court judge Ruth Bader Ginsburg, and in 2021, to "Colombian society" (Sociedad Colombiana) on the 30th anniversary of its democratic constitution, received by its then president Iván Duque Márquez.

In 2023, there were two awards given: to American civil rights activist and politician Andrew Young, and to Ursula von der Leyen, president of the European Commission.

In 2025, Sonia Sotomayor received this award in recognition of her impeccable judicial work and her efforts to uphold and apply the law even in difficult circumstances.

=== Ruth Bader Ginsburg Medal ===
The Ruth Bader Ginsburg Medal was named after US Supreme Court judge Ruth Bader Ginsburg. It was first presented in 2021, and aims to recognise prominent female jurists, who have often been forgotten in the past. Several of the awards have been awarded each year since then.

=== Medals of Honor ===
The WJA also awards other medals of honor, known as the WJA Medal of Honor, since 2019.

== Recognition ==
President of the WJA, Javier Cremades, was the recipient of the 2023 National Jurisprudence Award from the Mexican Bar Association.
