= Javier Cremades =

Spanish lawyer

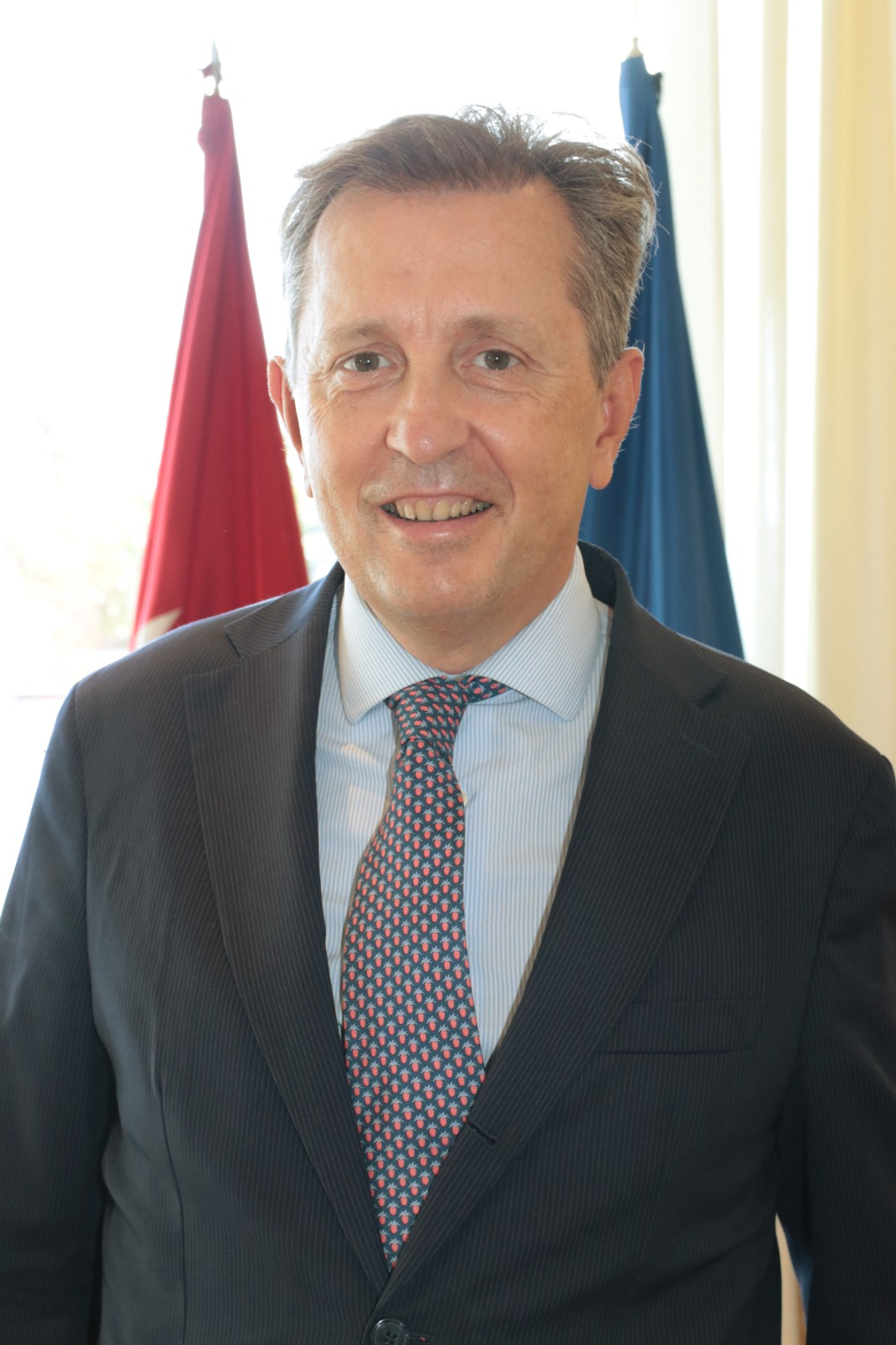
- Born: 25 August 1965 (age 61); Ceuta, Spain
- Occupation: Lawyer
- Awards: Jurist of the Year 2018. World Jurist Association

Academic background
- Education: Doctor of Constitutional Law
- Alma mater: University of Regensburg
- Thesis: Los límites de la libertad de expresión en el ordenamiento jurídico español ("The limits of freedom of expression in the Spanish legal system").
- Doctoral advisor: Rainer Arnold

Academic work
- Institutions: Cremades & Calvo-Sotelo
- Notable works: El paraíso digital (2001)
- Website: cremadescalvosotelo.com

Javier Cremades García (Ceuta, 25 August 1965) is a Spanish lawyer, founder and president of the international law firm Cremades & Calvo-Sotelo and he is the President of the World Jurist Association.

== Academic career ==
He holds a Law degree from the University of Malaga and has a Doctor of Constitutional Law degree from the University of Regensburg (Germany),. He received a Doctor of Law from the UNED (Spain) and holds an honorary doctorate from the International University of Valencia (Spain) and from the University of Tirana.

In 1989 he joined the Chair of Public Law at the University of Regensburg as scientific assistant to Professor Rainer Arnold, who would be his thesis advisor. His doctoral thesis was Los límites de la libertad de expresión en el ordenamiento jurídico español ("The limits of freedom of expression in the Spanish legal system").

After finishing his doctoral studies in Germany, he moved to Madrid in 1993, linking his academic career to the Spanish experts in constitutional law, Antonio Torres del Moral, and Manuel Aragón Reyes.

Cremades taught constitutional law for 15 years at the Universidad Carlos III and the UNED, and later created and directed the postgraduate programs "Master in Business and Law of Telecommunications, Internet and Audiovisual" (since 1997), "Master in Business and Law of Energy" (since 2007) and "Master in Management of Business Legal Advice" (since 2007).

== Legal career ==
Cremades worked at Garrigues law firm from 1993 to 1995, in international relations and in the shaping and practice of telecommunications law. As an expert lawyer in freedom of expression, he was active in the defense of the media and journalists (Grupo Prisa, ABC, El Español, Asociación de Editores...). Cremades also advised international companies in the telecommunications sector when Spain liberalized its stock market. One of the best known areas of his professional activity has been leading the international defence of the Venezuelan politician Leopoldo López, and different international actions as the International Manifesto of Jurists calling for the immediate release of López.

He has been a defender of small shareholders and investors, being the promoter of the Spanish Association of Minority Shareholders of Listed Companies, AEMEC, where he is Secretary General. On this point he stood out for taking on the defense of those affected by the Madoff Case and was elected president of the Madoff Case Global Law Firm Alliance. The alliance includes 34 firms from 21 countries.

Cremades has worked as an advisor in the drafting of the legal systems of several nations. He is president of the Spanish Eisenhower Fellowships Association. In 2019 chaired the World Law Congress with Javier Solana, and was elected president of the World Jurist Association.

In 2022, the Spanish Episcopal Conference hired the Cremades and Calvo-Sotelo law firm to investigate cases of abuse committed within the Church in Spain through an audit that would last at least a year.

== Publications ==
Cremades is the author and coordinator of academic publications in public law (mainly on freedom of expression and information) and in private law, particularly on corporate law. He has also been a regular columnist in several media (El País, El Mundo, ABC, Expansión, Diario 16, El Tiempo, CNN...)

Among his most recent works is the essay Sobre el Imperio de la Ley (Galaxia Gutenberg, 2025) —with a foreword by Justice of the Supreme Court of the United States (1994–2022) Stephen Breyer and an epilogue by Stephan Harbarth, President of the Federal Constitutional Court of Germany since 2020—, in which he reflects on the Rule of Law as a guarantee of freedom against the threats of force and populism (El Mundo, La Razón, Confilegal, Law&Trends). Additionally, his publications related to the digital irruption stand out, such as El Paraíso digital (Plaza y Janés, 2001) and Micropoder: La fuerza del ciudadano en la era digital (Espasa-Calpe, 2007). Among the publications with several authors stand out: E-lawyer with Enric Badia (La Ley-Actualidad, 2007); Régimen jurídico de internet (Wolters Kluwer 2001), developed with Miguel Fernández Ordoñez and Rafael Illescas and El planeta internet (Arguval, 2002) with Marian Carnicer and Santiago Rodríguez Bajón.

His doctoral expertise in terms of freedom of expression led him to publish, among others: Los límites de la libertad de expresión en el ordenamiento jurídico español, "The limits of freedom of expression in the Spanish legal system" (La Ley-Actualidad, 1995) and Derecho de las telecomunicaciones "Telecommunications Law" (La Ley-Actualidad, 2002) and with Pablo Mayor La liberalización de las telecomunicaciones en un mundo global "Telecommunications liberalization in a global world" (Wolters Kluwer/Ministerio de Fomento, 1999). His interests have also covered relations with China: China y sus libertades, un dilema para el siglo XXI, "China and its freedoms, a dilemma for the 21st century" (Espasa Calpe, 2008) and the energy sector: La energía secuestrada, "Hijacked energy" (Pearson Editores, 2013).

He is the publisher director of the series ""Derecho de las Telecomunicaciones"" and is on the editorial board of the "Revista Española de Derecho de las Telecomunicaciones" and the "Revista de la Contratación Electrónica".

== Recognition and honours ==
- Lawyer of the Year in Spain, Forbes magazine (2015).
- Jurist of the Year, World Jurist Association (2018)
- Doctor Honoris Causa, International University of Valencia (2013).
- Ordine della Stella d'Italia, Government of the Italian Republic.
- Foreign Corresponding Member of the Colombian Academy of Jurisprudence (2019).
- Medal of Honour of the Malaga Bar Association (2020).
- Medal of Honour, International Union of Lawyers (UIA, 2021).
- Full member, Royal European Academy of Doctors (2021).
- Barcelona Bar Association Medal (ICAB, 2022).
- Medal of Honor from the Madrid Bar Association (ICAM, 2022).
- 2023 National Jurisprudence Award of Mexico. Mexican Bar Association.
- Award for Greatest International Impact. International Press Club and the Associations of Foreign Press Correspondents, Ibero-American Press, African Press and Arab Journalists and Writers.
- Honorary Postdoctoral Fellowship from the University of Bologna (2024).
- First honorary consul of South Korea in Malaga (2024).
- Spanish Universal Award from the Fundación Independiente (2025).
- Spain's Number One Jurist by Mundiario (2026).
- Doctor Honoris Causa, University of Tirana (2026).
