= Elections in Suriname =

Suriname elects on the national level a head of state – the president – and a legislature. The president is elected for a five-year term by an electoral college based on the parliament. The National Assembly (Nationale Assemblée) has 51 members, elected every five years by proportional representation per district. Suriname has a multi-party system, with numerous parties in which no one party often has a chance of gaining power alone, and parties must work with each other to form coalition governments.

Suriname held general elections in 1928, 1930, 1932, 1934, 1936, 1938, 1942, 1946, 1949, 1951, 1955, 1958, 1963, 1967, 1969, 1973, 1977, 1987, 1991, 1996, 2000, 2005, 2010, 2015, 2020 and 2025.

== See also ==
- Electoral calendar
- Electoral system
