= 1886 Surinamese general election =

Partial general elections were held in Suriname in March 1886 to elect three of the nine elected members of the Colonial States.

== Electoral system ==
The Colonial States consisted of nine elected members and four appointed by the Governor-General. Elected members served six-year terms, with three members elected every two years. The 1886 elections were to replace the three members elected in 1880, A.J. van Emden, Johannes Cateau van Rosevelt and Coenraad van Lier. However, van Emden had resigned shortly after the elections as he was leaving Suriname, and was replaced by Cornelis Johannes Heylidy.

The elections were held using the two-round system, with suffrage restricted to men who paid a tax contribution of 60 Dutch guilders. Voters had multiple votes, and any candidate receiving a number of votes equivalent to over 50% of the valid ballots cast was elected in the first round. If not all seats were filled, a second round was held with twice the number of candidates as seats remaining, who were the candidates who received the most votes but failed to be elected in the first round.

== Results ==
As there were 143 valid ballots cast, candidates required 72 votes to be elected in the first round. All three incumbents were re-elected.

Candidate	Votes	%	Notes
Johannes Cateau van Rosevelt	119	83.22	Re-elected
Cornelis Johannes Heylidy	104	72.73	Re-elected
Coenraad van Lier	72	50.35	Re-elected
Julius Muller	56	39.16	
M. Schotman	22	15.38	
Christiaan Hendrik van Meurs	9	6.29	
Hendrikus d'Angremond	6	4.20	
J.R.C. Gonggrijp	4	2.80	
Eduard Adriaan Cabell	4	2.80	
J.P.W. van Eijck	4	2.80	
Willem August van Emden	3	2.10	
J. Kalff	2	1.40	
H.D. Benjamins	1	0.70	
A.N. Bixby	1	0.70	
J. Fennelly	1	0.70	
Jan Philippus Albertus Hoeffelman	1	0.70	
W.L. Loth	1	0.70	
N. van Meerten	1	0.70	
Jacob Nicolaas Eckhardt de Mesquita	1	0.70	
Henri Muller	1	0.70	
H.S. Schoten	1	0.70	
Total	414	100.00	
Valid votes	143	97.95	
Invalid/blank votes	3	2.05	
Total votes	146	100.00	
Source: Koloniaal Nieuws

== Aftermath ==
Governor-General Johannes van Heerdt tot Eversberg reappointed David Juda, Wouterus van Esveld, Marinus Carel de Leeuw and J.F. Saile Vanier as nominated members.

The newly elected States met for the first time in May, with Juda remaining chairman.

De Leeuw died in 1887 but was not replaced until after the 1888 elections.
