= 1898 Surinamese general election =

Partial general elections were held in Suriname on 23 March and in April 1898 to elect three of the nine elected members of the Colonial States.

== Electoral system ==
The Colonial States consisted of nine elected members and four appointed by the Governor-General. Elected members served six-year terms, with three members elected every two years. The 1898 elections were to replace the three members elected in 1892, Cornelis Johannes Heylidy, Christiaan Hendrik van Meurs and Henry Barnett. Van Meurs had vacated his seat by taking a leave of absence due to ill-health, and had been replaced by Theophilius Libertador Ellis in a 1894 by-election, while in 1895 Barnett was replaced by Justus Gonggrijp. All three incumbents ran for re-election.

The elections were held using the two-round system, with suffrage restricted to men who paid a tax contribution of 60 Dutch guilders. Voters had multiple votes, and any candidate receiving a number of votes equivalent to over 50% of the valid ballots cast was elected in the first round. If not all seats were filled, a second round was held.

== Results ==
As there were 328 valid ballots cast, candidates required 165 votes to be elected in the first round.

Candidate	First round		Second round		Notes
Candidate	Votes	%	Votes	%	Notes
Cornelis Johannes Heylidy	221	67.38			Re-elected
Theophilius Libertador Ellis	214	65.24			Re-elected
Daniel Coutinho	157	47.87	210	71.67	Elected
J.O. Harken	126	38.41	83	28.33	
Justus Gonggrijp	113	34.45			Unseated
Richard O'Ferrall	77	23.48			
J.E. Aberbanel	27	8.23			
W.J. van Voss	10	3.05			
A.J. Jessurun	5	1.52			
Karel Hendrik Bergen	4	1.22			
J.P.W. van Eijck	3	0.91			
Reinbertus Aloisius Tammenga	3	0.91			
J.W. van Voss	2	0.61			
J.L. Hijmans	2	0.61			
J.J.P. Wessels	2	0.61			
Anton Dragten	1	0.30			
J.H. Wijngaarde	1	0.30			
A.H. Reiziger	1	0.30			
M.F.A. del Prado	1	0.30			
D.H. Havclaar	1	0.30			
W.G. van Vos	1	0.30			
J. van West	1	0.30			
W. van Voss	1	0.30			
H. Hubner	1	0.30			
Total	975	100.00	293	100.00	
Valid votes	328	99.70	293	98.99	
Invalid/blank votes	1	0.30	3	1.01	
Total votes	329	100.00	296	100.00	
Registered voters/turnout	454	72.47			
Source: Nieuwe Surinaamsche Courant, De Surinamer, De West-Indiër

== Aftermath ==
The Governor-General reappointed Isaac da Costa, Adrianus van 't Hoogerhuys, Salomon Matthijs Swijt and Reinbertus Aloisius Tammenga as nominated members. Cornelis Johannes Heylidy remained chairman.
