= 1890 Surinamese general election =

Partial general elections were held in Suriname in March 1890 to elect three of the nine elected members of the Colonial States.

== Electoral system ==
The Colonial States consisted of nine elected members and four appointed by the Governor-General. Elected members served six-year terms, with three members elected every two years. The 1890 elections were to replace the three members elected in 1884, G.H. Barnet Lyon, Marcus Samson van Praag and Abraham Salomons, all three of whom ran for re-election.

The elections were held using the two-round system, with suffrage restricted to men who paid a tax contribution of 60 Dutch guilders. Voters had multiple votes, and any candidate receiving a number of votes equivalent to over 50% of the valid ballots cast was elected in the first round. If not all seats were filled, a second round was held with twice the number of candidates as seats remaining, who were the candidates who received the most votes but failed to be elected in the first round.

== Results ==
As there were 167 valid ballots cast, candidates required 84 votes to be elected in the first round. All three incumbents were easily re-elected, with no other candidate receiving more than ten votes.

Candidate	Votes	%	Notes
G.H. Barnet Lyon	151	90.42	Re-elected
Marcus Samson van Praag	150	89.82	Re-elected
Abraham Salomons	146	87.43	Re-elected
L.C. van Amson	10	5.99	
Theophilius Libertador Ellis	7	4.19	
Guillaume Jean Vanier	6	3.59	
Henry Barnett	3	1.80	
H.M. Leijsner	2	1.20	
Richard O'Ferrall	2	1.20	
C.F. van Weede	2	1.20	
Karel Hendrik Bergen	2	1.20	
Samuel D. Fernandes	2	1.20	
Frits Curiel	2	1.20	
Salomon Matthijs Swijt	2	1.20	
L.E. de Blocq van Scheltinga	1	0.60	
Jacob Kalff	1	0.60	
H. Weijtingh	1	0.60	
S.M. Polak	1	0.60	
M.S. Polak	1	0.60	
Joseph Levij	1	0.60	
S.H. Samson	1	0.60	
J.N. Eckhardt de Mesquita	1	0.60	
E.A. van Romondt	1	0.60	
Justus Gonggrijp	1	0.60	
P.A. Bruggemann	1	0.60	
R.H. Kramer	1	0.60	
J. Gilhuijs	1	0.60	
W.H. Blau	1	0.60	
Total	501	100.00	
Valid votes	167	98.24	
Invalid votes	1	0.59	
Blank votes	2	1.18	
Total votes	170	100.00	
Source: De West-Indiër

== Aftermath ==
Governor-General Maurits Adriaan de Savornin Lohman reappointed David Juda and Salomon Matthijs Swijt as nominated members, together with Pieter van den Broek and Henry Barnett. The newly elected States met for the first time in May, with Juda remaining chairman.

A by-election was held in November 1890 following the resignation of Coenraad van Lier (elected in 1886) due to him moving to Amsterdam. Nominated member Henry Barnett was elected, and was replaced as a nominated member by Jacob Kalff. Kalff was subsequently involved in a dispute with the Governor-General, removed from the States and replaced by Anthonis Hendrik van Geyt.

Johannes Cateau van Rosevelt, who also been elected in 1886, died in 1891.
