= 1892 Surinamese general election =

Partial general elections were held in Suriname in March 1892 to elect three of the nine elected members of the Colonial States.

== Electoral system ==
The Colonial States consisted of nine elected members and four appointed by the Governor-General. Elected members served six-year terms, with three members elected every two years. The 1892 elections were to replace the three members elected in 1886, Johannes Cateau van Rosevelt, Cornelis Johannes Heylidy and Coenraad van Lier. Van Lier had retired from the States in 1891 and was replaced by Henry Barnett. Van Rosevelt died later the same year. Both Heylidy and Barnett ran for re-election.

The elections were held using the two-round system, with suffrage restricted to men who paid a tax contribution of 60 Dutch guilders. Voters had multiple votes, and any candidate receiving a number of votes equivalent to over 50% of the valid ballots cast was elected in the first round. If not all seats were filled, a second round was held with twice the number of candidates as seats remaining, who were the candidates who received the most votes but failed to be elected in the first round.

== Results ==
As there were 137 valid ballots cast, candidates required 69 votes to be elected in the first round.

Candidate	Votes	%	Notes
Cornelis Johannes Heylidy	116	84.67	Re-elected
Christiaan Hendrik van Meurs	114	83.21	Elected
Henry Barnett	93	67.88	Re-elected
Frans Carel Gefken	18	13.14	
Guillaume Jean Vanier	11	8.03	
A.J. da Costa	7	5.11	
A.E.J.W. Juta	6	4.38	
J.L.W.C. von Weiler	5	3.65	
J.A. Reelfs	4	2.92	
W.A. van Emden	3	2.19	
Daniel Coutinho	3	2.19	
Eduard Adriaan Cabell	3	2.19	
J. da Costa	2	1.46	
A.A. ter Laag	2	1.46	
J. dela Parra	2	1.46	
L.C. van Amson	1	0.73	
J. Rosenberg	1	0.73	
John Fredrik Green	1	0.73	
J. van West	1	0.73	
C. Busch	1	0.73	
Justus Gonggrijp	1	0.73	
M. Benjamins	1	0.73	
H.M.P. Koli	1	0.73	
P.A. Bruggemann	1	0.73	
W.L. Loth	1	0.73	
A. Esser	1	0.73	
J.P. Hoeffelman	1	0.73	
J.D.W. Hordijk	1	0.73	
A.J. Jessurun	1	0.73	
J.P.W. van Eijck	1	0.73	
D.M. Polak	1	0.73	
M.S. Polak	1	0.73	
Total	406	100.00	
Valid votes	137	97.16	
Invalid/blank votes	4	2.84	
Total votes	141	100.00	
Source: De West-Indiër

== Aftermath ==
The Governor-General reappointed Anthonis Hendrik van Geyt, David Juda and Salomon Matthijs Swijt as nominated members, together with John Fredrik Green. Juda remained chairman.

Later in 1892 van Geyt was replaced by Isaac da Costa, while George Henry Barnet Lyon resigned and was replaced by Frans Carel Gefken.
