= 1880 Surinamese general election =

Partial general elections were held in Suriname in March 1880 to elect three of the nine elected members of the Colonial States.

== Electoral system ==
The Colonial States consisted of nine elected members and four appointed by the Governor-General. Elected members served six-year terms, with three members elected every two years. The 1880 elections were to replace the three members elected in 1874, Johannes Cateau van Rosevelt, A.J. van Emden and B.E. Colaço Belmonte, although Colaço Belmonte had resigned in 1878.

The elections were held using the two-round system, with suffrage restricted to men who paid a tax contribution of 60 Dutch guilders. Voters had multiple votes, and any candidate receiving a number of votes equivalent to over 50% of the valid ballots cast was elected in the first round. If not all seats were filled, a second round was held with twice the number of candidates as seats remaining, who were the candidates who received the most votes but failed to be elected in the first round.

== Results ==
As there were 71 valid ballots cast, candidates required 36 votes to be elected in the first round. Incumbents van Emden, van Rosevelt and van Lier were easily re-elected.

Candidate	Votes	%	Notes
A.J. van Emden	60	84.51	Re-elected
Johannes Cateau van Rosevelt	55	77.46	Re-elected
Coenraad van Lier	48	67.61	Re-elected
J. Colaço Belmonte	9	12.68	
N. van den Brandhof	7	9.86	
Semuel van Praag	7	9.86	
Arnold Borret	5	7.04	
Abraham Salomons	3	4.23	
C.M. Bremer	2	2.82	
S.L. Hijmans	2	2.82	
Henri Muller	1	1.41	
Frederick Paul Penard	1	1.41	
Rudolph Hendrik Leijsner	1	1.41	
S.A. Heilbron	1	1.41	
Jon Ben	1	1.41	
Total	203	100.00	
Valid votes	71	98.61	
Invalid votes	0	0.00	
Blank votes	1	1.39	
Total votes	72	100.00	
Source: Surinaamsche courant

== Aftermath ==
Governor-General Cornelis Ascanius van Sypesteyn reappointed Karel Daniel Brakke, David Juda, J.F. Saile Vanier and Joël Benjamin Vos as nominated members.

The newly elected States met for the first time on 11 May 1880, with Juda remaining chairman.

Jacob Alexander Salomons (elected in 1878) resigned in May 1880 and was replaced by Abraham Salomons. Van Emden left Suriname in June 1880 and was replaced by Cornelis Johannes Heylidy, while Phoebus Hitzerus Verbeek (elected in 1876) resigned on 2 July 1880 and was replaced by Arend d'Angremond. Brakke resigned in May 1881 and was replaced by Arnold Borret.
