= 1906 Surinamese general election =

Partial general elections were held in Suriname in March 1906 to elect four of the thirteen members of the Colonial States.

== Electoral system ==
The elections were held using the two-round system, with suffrage restricted to men who paid a tax contribution of 60 Dutch guilders. Voters had multiple votes, and any candidate receiving a number of votes equivalent to over 50% of the valid ballots cast was elected in the first round. If not all seats were filled, a second round was held.

Candidates were elected for a six-year term with staggered elections every two years. However, all 13 members had been renewed in the 1902 elections; they were divided into three groups; five had two-year terms and were up for renewal in 1904, four had four-year terms and were up for renewal in 1906 and four had six-year terms and were up for renewal in 1908.

The four members with two-year terms were Frits Curiel, Frans Carel Gefken, Jacques Bernard Nassy (who had been elected in 1903 as a replacement for Marcus Samson van Praag) and Reinbertus Aloisius Tammenga. Three of the four ran for re-election.

Around 800 people were eligible to vote.

== Results ==
With 273 valid votes cast, candidates required 137 votes to be elected in the first round.

Candidate	Votes	%	Notes
Frits Curiel	237	86.81	Re-elected
Frans Carel Gefken	222	81.32	Re-elected
Reinbertus Aloisius Tammenga	166	60.81	Re-elected
Samuel Bueno Bibaz	137	50.18	Elected
A.M.W. Ter Laag	133	48.72	
Pieter Walther Hering	59	21.61	
A.J.J. Moelaart	29	10.62	
Total	983	100.00	
Valid votes	273	92.86	
Invalid/blank votes	21	7.14	
Total votes	294	100.00	
Source: De Surinamer

== Aftermath ==
Alexander Ferrier Wilmans (elected in 1902) resigned in September 1906 to move to the Netherlands, with August Richard Bueno winning the by-election to succeed him.

October 1906 by-election
Candidate	Votes	%
August Richard Bueno	136	50.56
A.M.W. Ter Laag	133	49.44
Total	269	100.00
Valid votes	269	90.57
Invalid/blank votes	28	9.43
Total votes	297	100.00
Registered voters/turnout	814	36.49
Source: De Surinamer

Jacobus Carolius Juda (elected in a 1905 by-election) resigned in 1907. Adrianus van 't Hoogerhuys was the only nominee in the subsequent by-election and was elected unopposed.

François Wijnand Hensen (elected in 1904) died in late 1907. Raimond Nazaire Guillaume Marie Bär von Hemmersweil was elected unopposed.
