= 1884 Surinamese general election =

Partial general elections were held in Suriname in March 1884 to elect three of the nine elected members of the Colonial States.

== Electoral system ==
The Colonial States consisted of nine elected members and four appointed by the Governor-General. Elected members served six-year terms, with three members elected every two years. The 1884 elections were to replace the three members elected in 1878, G.H. Barnet Lyon, Charles Busken Huet and Jacob Alexander Salomons. However, Busken Huet resigned shortly after being elected and was replaced by Marcus Samson van Praag, while Salomons resigned in 1880 and was replaced by Abraham Salomons.

The elections were held using the two-round system, with suffrage restricted to men who paid a tax contribution of 60 Dutch guilders. Voters had multiple votes, and any candidate receiving a number of votes equivalent to over 50% of the valid ballots cast was elected in the first round. If not all seats were filled, a second round was held with twice the number of candidates as seats remaining, who were the candidates who received the most votes but failed to be elected in the first round.

== Results ==
As there were 126 valid ballots cast, candidates required 64 votes to be elected in the first round. All three incumbents were easily re-elected with over 100 votes.

Candidate	Votes	%	Notes
G.H. Barnet Lyon	117	92.86	Re-elected
Marcus Samson van Praag	112	88.89	Re-elected
Abraham Salomons	102	80.95	Re-elected
Julius Muller	20	15.87	
Semuel van Praag	6	4.76	
Willem August van Emden	3	2.38	
M. Schotman	3	2.38	
Jacob Nicolaas Eckhardt de Mesquita	1	0.79	
Eduard Adriaan Cabell	1	0.79	
Marinus Carel de Leeuw	1	0.79	
Total	366	100.00	
Valid votes	126	97.67	
Invalid votes	1	0.78	
Blank votes	2	1.55	
Total votes	129	100.00	
Source: Surinaamsche courant

== Aftermath ==
Governor-General Johannes van Heerdt tot Eversberg reappointed David Juda, Wouterus van Esveld, G.A.H. Knoch and J.F. Saile Vanier as nominated members.

The newly elected States met for the first time on 13 May 1884, with Juda remaining chairman. In the same month Knoch was replaced by Marinus Carel de Leeuw.
