= 1934 Surinamese general election =

Partial general elections were held in Suriname on 3 April and 4 May 1934 to elect five of the thirteen members of the Colonial States.

== Electoral system ==
The elections were held using the two-round system, with suffrage restricted to men who paid a tax contribution of 60 Dutch guilders. Voters had multiple votes, and any candidate receiving a number of votes equivalent to over 50% of the valid ballots cast was elected in the first round. If not all seats were filled, a second round was held.

Candidates were elected for a six-year term with staggered elections every two years and the 1934 elections were to replace the five members elected in the 1928 elections. Only three of them – William Kraan, Henry George Willem de Miranda and Albert Gustaaf Putscher – were still in office and serving the same term; Anton Dragten had resigned in 1932 and been replaced by Gerson Philip Zaal, while Pieter Alexander May had also resigned in 1932 and been replaced by Karel Johannes van Erpecum (May had subsequently run in a 1933 by-election and been elected to serve the remainder of the term of Samuel Juda Samuels, who had been elected in 1930).

Four of the five incumbents – Kraan, de Miranda, Putscher and Zaal – ran for re-election, while van Erpecum did not.

== Results ==
As there were 418 valid votes, candidates required 210 to be elected in the first round. The four contesting incumbents were re-elected in the first round, with Albert Frederik Willem Kampens defeating C.E. Wolf by just one vote in the second round.

Candidate	First round		Second round		Notes
Candidate	Votes	%	Votes	%	Notes
William Kraan	301	72.01			Re-elected
Henry George Willem de Miranda	285	68.18			Re-elected
Gerson Philip Zaal	273	65.31			Re-elected
Albert Gustaaf Putscher	251	60.05			Re-elected
Albert Frederik Willem Kampens	194	46.41	165	50.15	Elected
C.E. Wolf	130	31.10	164	49.85	
Alfred Morpurgo	127	30.38			
Total	1,561	100.00	329	100.00	
Valid votes	418	93.51	329	95.36	
Invalid/blank votes	29	6.49	16	4.64	
Total votes	447	100.00	345	100.00	
Source: De West, De Surinamer

== Aftermath ==
In 1935 Johannes Brons (elected in 1930) resigned and was replaced by the returning Karel Johannes van Erpecum, who was declared elected unopposed on 11 February.
