= 1896 Surinamese general election =

Partial general elections were held in Suriname on 18 March 1896 to elect three of the nine elected members of the Colonial States.

== Electoral system ==
The Colonial States consisted of nine elected members and four appointed by the Governor-General. Elected members served six-year terms, with three members elected every two years. The 1896 elections were to replace the three members elected in 1890, G.H. Barnet Lyon, Marcus Samson van Praag and Abraham Salomons. Barnet Lyon had resigned in 1892 and been replaced by Frans Carel Gefken. Van Praag, Salomons and Gefken all ran for re-election.

The elections were held using the two-round system, with suffrage restricted to men who paid a tax contribution of 60 Dutch guilders. Voters had multiple votes, and any candidate receiving a number of votes equivalent to over 50% of the valid ballots cast was elected in the first round. If not all seats were filled, a second round was held.

== Results ==
As there were 239 valid ballots cast, candidates required 120 votes to be elected in the first round. All three incumbents were easily re-elected.

Candidate	Votes	%	Notes
Marcus Samson van Praag	211	88.28	Re-elected
Abraham Salomons	177	74.06	Re-elected
Frans Carel Gefken	160	66.95	Re-elected
W.H.V. Baron van Heerdt tot Eversberg	37	15.48	
G.J.J. Karg	33	13.81	
Richard O'Ferrall	24	10.04	
Frits Curiel	10	4.18	
Jacques Bernard Nassy	9	3.77	
G.K. Kramer	6	2.51	
Daniel Coutinho	6	2.51	
Eduard Adriaan Cabell	4	1.67	
S.H. Pos	3	1.26	
M.F.A. del Prado	3	1.26	
J.O. Harken	2	0.84	
F.G. Hanken	2	0.84	
J.L. Hijmans	2	0.84	
J.L.W.C. von Weiler	2	0.84	
P.A. Bruggemann	1	0.42	
L.F. Schoch	1	0.42	
L. Monsanto	1	0.42	
C. May Boëtius	1	0.42	
J.P.W. van Eyck	1	0.42	
Adrianus van 't Hoogerhuys	1	0.42	
J. Pesman	1	0.42	
J.J. Halfhide	1	0.42	
H. van Breen	1	0.42	
A.E.J.W. Juta	1	0.42	
A.J. Walther	1	0.42	
D. da Silva	1	0.42	
G. Wildeboer	1	0.42	
W. van Esveld	1	0.42	
H. Hubner	1	0.42	
A.J. Jessurn	1	0.42	
J. de la Parra	1	0.42	
F. Bulo	1	0.42	
François Wijnand Hensen	1	0.42	
A.A. Samuels	1	0.42	
Total	711	100.00	
Valid votes	239	98.76	
Invalid votes	0	0.00	
Blank votes	3	1.24	
Total votes	242	100.00	
Source: De Surinamer

== Aftermath ==
The Governor-General reappointed Isaac da Costa, Adrianus van 't Hoogerhuys, David Juda and Salomon Matthijs Swijt as nominated members. Juda remained chairman.

Later in 1896 Juda was replaced by Samuel Muller van Voorst, with Cornelis Johannes Heylidy taking over as chair. In 1897 van Voorst was replaced by Reinbertus Aloisius Tammenga. A.H. de Granada left the States and a by-election was held on 18 December 1897, which was won by Frits Curiel, who received 133 of the 253 votes cast.
