= 1916 Surinamese general election =

Partial general elections were held in Suriname in March 1916 to elect five of the thirteen members of the Colonial States.

== Electoral system ==
The elections were held using the two-round system, with suffrage restricted to men who paid a tax contribution of 60 Dutch guilders. Voters had multiple votes, and any candidate receiving a number of votes equivalent to over 50% of the valid ballots cast was elected in the first round. If not all seats were filled, a second round was held.

Candidates were elected for a six-year term with staggered elections every two years and the 1916 elections were for the five members elected in the 1910 elections. Only two of the five – Jacobus Arnoldus Dragten and John Robert Thomson – were still in office. Daniel Coutinho had resigned in 1910 and been replaced by Adolf Curiel, Franciscus Smith had resigned in 1912 and been replaced by Pieter Alexander May (who subsequently resigned in 1914 and was replaced by Wilhelmus Nicolaas Stephanus Arntz), while Isaac da Costa had resigned in 1915 and been replaced by Hubert van Asch van Wijck.

All five incumbents – Arntz, van Amsch van Wijck, Curiel, Dragten and Thomson – ran for re-election.

== Results ==
As there were 332 valid votes, candidates required 167 to be elected in the first round.

Candidate	Votes	%	Notes
Hubert van Asch van Wijck	245	73.80	Re-elected
Jacobus Arnoldus Dragten	228	68.67	Re-elected
John Robert Thomson	222	66.87	Re-elected
Robert David Simons	214	64.46	Elected
Adolf Curiel	208	62.65	Re-elected
Wilhelmus Nicolaas Stephanus Arntz	137	41.27	Unseated
Total	1,254	100.00	
Valid votes	332	97.94	
Invalid/blank votes	7	2.06	
Total votes	339	100.00	
Source: De Surinamer
