= 1904 Surinamese general election =

Partial general elections were held in Suriname in March 1904 to elect five of the thirteen members of the Colonial States.

== Electoral system ==
The elections were held using the two-round system, with suffrage restricted to men who paid a tax contribution of 60 Dutch guilders. Voters had multiple votes, and any candidate receiving a number of votes equivalent to over 50% of the valid ballots cast was elected in the first round. If not all seats were filled, a second round was held.

Candidates were elected for a six-year term with staggered elections every two years. However, all 13 members had been renewed in the 1902 elections; they were divided into three groups; five had two-year terms and were up for renewal in 1904, four had four-year terms and were up for renewal in 1906 and four had six-year terms and were up for renewal in 1908.

The five members with two-year terms were Karel Hendrik Bergen (who had only been elected in January 1903 to replace Julius Muller), Daniel Coutinho, Isaac da Costa, Jacobus Arnoldus Dragten and Cornelis Johannes Heylidy. All five ran for re-election.

Around 800 people were eligible to vote.

== Results ==
With 469 valid votes cast, candidates required 235 votes to be elected in the first round.

Candidate	Votes	%	Notes
Jacobus Arnoldus Dragten	374	79.74	Re-elected
Daniel Coutinho	362	77.19	Re-elected
Isaac da Costa	344	73.35	Re-elected
Charles Ferdinand Schoch	314	66.95	Elected
François Wijnand Hensen	266	56.72	Elected
Karel Hendrik Bergen	192	40.94	Unseated
Th.J.F. Valoise Smith	48	10.23	
Richard O'Ferrall	20	4.26	
H.J. van der Sluys	16	3.41	
Cornelis Johannes Heylidy	9	1.92	Unseated
C.A.J. Struiken	9	1.92	
Samuel Bueno Bibaz	9	1.92	
Roelof Fabriek	8	1.71	
A. Lindveld	7	1.49	
Jie-Sam-Foek	5	1.07	
J. Pool	3	0.64	
A.R. Einaar	3	0.64	
A.A. Ter Laag	3	0.64	
G.F.C. Hering	2	0.43	
Jacobus Carolius Juda	2	0.43	
L. Scheurlen	2	0.43	
W.E. Soesman	2	0.43	
P. Carst	2	0.43	
W.H.A. van Romondt	2	0.43	
A. Jie-A-Foek	2	0.43	
J. Hoogstad	2	0.43	
C.W. Wildeboer	2	0.43	
J.G. Kaersenhout	2	0.43	
L.F. Voet	2	0.43	
Frowein	2	0.43	
E.A. Cabell	2	0.43	
C.F.A. Abendanon	1	0.21	
Bath	1	0.21	
F. Boissevain	1	0.21	
Heniy Bos	1	0.21	
P.A. Bruggemann	1	0.21	
P.A.A. Bucaille	1	0.21	
R. Bueno de Mesquita	1	0.21	
W.F. Chateau	1	0.21	
J.E. Dachten	1	0.21	
J.V. Dahlberg	1	0.21	
H. d'Angremond	1	0.21	
Dragten	1	0.21	
G.J. Fabius	1	0.21	
Joost Fernandes	1	0.21	
J.R. Folmer	1	0.21	
F. Folmer	1	0.21	
S.H. Gonggrijp	1	0.21	
Gorsira	1	0.21	
Sandy Green	1	0.21	
James Green	1	0.21	
G.C. Grefe	1	0.21	
S.L. Guicherit	1	0.21	
W. ten Harmsen van der Beek	1	0.21	
L.J. Heilbron	1	0.21	
Pitta Heilbron	1	0.21	
J.N. Helstone	1	0.21	
Hoekstra	1	0.21	
Th.E. Juda	1	0.21	
A.V. Juda	1	0.21	
W. de Kanter	1	0.21	
S.J. Koster	1	0.21	
William Kraan	1	0.21	
A. Krabbendam	1	0.21	
A.J. Le Grand	1	0.21	
A. de Leeuw-Caupain	1	0.21	
Jong-A Loek	1	0.21	
Beckering van Loenen	1	0.21	
Luchmonsing	1	0.21	
Jack Mercurius	1	0.21	
Eli Morpurgo	1	0.21	
A.P. Nassy	1	0.21	
J. Noordbergh	1	0.21	
J.A. Pet	1	0.21	
J.M. Polak	1	0.21	
A. Polak	1	0.21	
W.I.H. Polak	1	0.21	
J. van Praag	1	0.21	
C.P. Rier	1	0.21	
C. Samuels	1	0.21	
J. Samuels	1	0.21	
A. Samuels	1	0.21	
J.W. Schenkel	1	0.21	
Franciscus Smith	1	0.21	
Valois Smith	1	0.21	
J.N. Stolk	1	0.21	
W.A.C. Stolting	1	0.21	
W.A. de Sturler	1	0.21	
C.H. Themen	1	0.21	
E.A. Tjin-Kon-Fat	1	0.21	
Tjong-Poen-Gin	1	0.21	
F de Vries	1	0.21	
M. Vyent	1	0.21	
J.E. Wesenhagen	1	0.21	
H.W. Weytingh	1	0.21	
A. Wolf	1	0.21	
Wong-Lun-Hing	1	0.21	
Total	2,084	100.00	
Valid votes	469	97.30	
Invalid/blank votes	13	2.70	
Total votes	482	100.00	
Source: De Surinamer

== Aftermath ==
In 1905 Frederik Willem Morren resigned. Although Henri Benjamins won the by-election held in March to succeed him, he declined the offer and Roelof Fabriek won the subsequent by-election in April.

9 March 1905 by-election
Candidate	Votes	%
Henri Benjamins	212	59.38
Karel Hendrik Bergen	83	23.25
Samuel Bueno Bibaz	35	9.80
Richard O'Ferrall	8	2.24
C. van Drimmeln	4	1.12
H.J. van Ommeren	3	0.84
Wong-Lung-Hing	3	0.84
J.L. Hijmans	2	0.56
L.C. Dongen	1	0.28
Roelof Fabriek	1	0.28
Th. Valois Smith	1	0.28
R.F.A. Del Prado	1	0.28
L.J. Heilbron	1	0.28
M.H. Arland	1	0.28
J.A. de Gelder	1	0.28
Total	357	100.00
Valid votes	357	93.95
Invalid votes	3	0.79
Blank votes	20	5.26
Total votes	380	100.00
Source: De Surinamer

April 1905 by-election
Candidate	First round		Second round	
Candidate	Votes	%	Votes	%
Roelof Fabriek	136	30.98	214	51.07
Jacobus Carolius Juda	135	30.75	205	48.93
Karel Hendrik Bergen	110	25.06		
Richard O'Ferrall	21	4.78		
L.J. Heilbron	12	2.73		
J.E. Abarbanel	9	2.05		
J.J. Halfhide	7	1.59		
Samuel Bueno Bibaz	2	0.46		
Julius Warner	1	0.23		
S.M.M. de Vries	1	0.23		
Van Sichem	1	0.23		
Sleeswijk	1	0.23		
J. Bakker	1	0.23		
A.A. Ter Laag	1	0.23		
H. Moll	1	0.23		
Total	439	100.00	419	100.00
Valid votes	439	96.91	419	96.10
Invalid/blank votes	14	3.09	17	3.90
Total votes	453	100.00	436	100.00
Source: De Surinamer

Charles Ferdinand Schoch also resigned in 1905 as he left Suriname to work in the Netherlands. Karel Hendrik Bergen was elected as his successor in June.

June–July 1905 by-election
Candidate	First round		Second round	
Candidate	Votes	%	Votes	%
Karel Hendrik Bergen	195	48.51	284	58.44
D. Fernandes Jr.	175	43.53	202	41.56
Jacobus Carolius Juda	17	4.23		
H.M.D. Robertson	8	1.99		
Richard O'Ferrall	3	0.75		
Pieter Alexander May	1	0.25		
Bergen	1	0.25		
W. Bovel	1	0.25		
D. Fernandes	1	0.25		
Total	402	100.00	486	100.00
Valid votes	402	95.26	486	97.20
Invalid/blank votes	20	4.74	14	2.80
Total votes	422	100.00	500	100.00
Source: De Surinamer, Nieuew Surinaamsche courant

Adrianus van 't Hoogerhuys (elected in 1902) resigned the same year. Jacobus Carolius Juda was elected as his successor.

August 1905 by-election
Candidate	Votes	%
Jacobus Carolius Juda	198	89.19
D. Fernandes Jr.	20	9.01
Richard O'Ferrall	2	0.90
J. Warner	1	0.45
M. Vijent	1	0.45
Total	222	100.00
Valid votes	222	96.10
Invalid/blank votes	9	3.90
Total votes	231	100.00
Source: De Surinamer

Bergen died shortly after being elected and was replaced by John Robert Thomson.

October 1905 by-election
Candidate	Votes	%
John Robert Thomson	128	61.24
Samuel Bueno Bibaz	48	22.97
Pieter Walther Hering	19	9.09
F. Siewertsz van Reesema	3	1.44
Wong-Lun-Hing	2	0.96
Richard O'Ferrall	1	0.48
A. Beck	1	0.48
M. Jessurun	1	0.48
J.A.E. Berkenveld	1	0.48
C. Zeekamp	1	0.48
J. Warner	1	0.48
J.J. van Meerten	1	0.48
J.C. Juda	1	0.48
Ta Jauw	1	0.48
Total	209	100.00
Valid votes	209	96.31
Invalid/blank votes	8	3.69
Total votes	217	100.00
Source: De Surinamer
