= 1900 Surinamese general election =

Partial general elections were held in Suriname on 21 March 1900 to elect three of the nine elected members of the Colonial States.

== Electoral system ==
The Colonial States consisted of nine elected members and four appointed by the Governor-General. Elected members served six-year terms, with three members elected every two years. The 1898 elections were to replace the three members elected in 1894, Julius Muller, A.H. de Granada and Guillaume Jean Vanier. Granada had been replaced by Frits Curiel in 1897. All three incumbents ran for re-election.

The elections were held using the two-round system, with suffrage restricted to men who paid a tax contribution of 60 Dutch guilders. Voters had multiple votes, and any candidate receiving a number of votes equivalent to over 50% of the valid ballots cast was elected in the first round. If not all seats were filled, a second round was held.

== Results ==
As there were 271 valid ballots cast, candidates required 136 votes to be elected in the first round.

Candidate	Votes	%	Notes
Frits Curiel	263	97.05	Re-elected
Julius Muller	191	70.48	Re-elected
François Wijnand Hensen	168	61.99	Elected
Richard O'Ferrall	92	33.95	
J.J. Halfhide	40	14.76	
Jacques Bernard Nassy	13	4.80	
J.O. Harken	7	2.58	
Samuel Bueno Bibaz	5	1.85	
S.E.J. Demarchi	2	0.74	
Karel Hendrik Bergen	2	0.74	
J.A.H. Reiziger	2	0.74	
A. Bruyning	2	0.74	
A.J. Baron Schimmelpenninck van der Oye	1	0.37	
Guillaume Jean Vanier	1	0.37	Unseated
J.H.S. Tafares	1	0.37	
I. Arah	1	0.37	
Reinbertus Aloisius Tammenga	1	0.37	
J.L. Hijmans	1	0.37	
J.E. Abarbanel	1	0.37	
C.A. Ma Ajong	1	0.37	
Samuel Muller van Voorst	1	0.37	
Total	796	100.00	
Valid votes	271	98.55	
Invalid votes	0	0.00	
Blank votes	4	1.45	
Total votes	275	100.00	
Source: Nieuwe Surinaamsche Courant

== Aftermath ==
The Governor-General reappointed Isaac da Costa, Adrianus van 't Hoogerhuys, Salomon Matthijs Swijt and Reinbertus Aloisius Tammenga as nominated members. Cornelis Johannes Heylidy remained chairman.
