= 1918 Surinamese general election =

Partial general elections were held in Suriname in March 1918 to elect four of the thirteen members of the Colonial States.

== Electoral system ==
The elections were held using the two-round system, with suffrage restricted to men who paid a tax contribution of 60 Dutch guilders. Voters had multiple votes, and any candidate receiving a number of votes equivalent to over 50% of the valid ballots cast was elected in the first round. If not all seats were filled, a second round was held.

Candidates were elected for a six-year term with staggered elections every two years and the 1918 elections were for the four members elected in the 1912 elections. However, all four had since resigned, three of them in 1914; Eduard Zeiler was replaced by Hendrik Salm (who himself subsequently resigned in 1915 and was replaced by Willem Dijckmeester), Samuel Bueno Bibaz by Adolf Nassy and Lucas Lubbertus Beckeringh van Loenen by Pieter Walther Hering. The fourth member, Dirk Olthuis, resigned in 1915 and was replaced by Harry van Ommeren.

Of the four incumbents, Dijckmeester, Hering and van Ommeren ran for re-election, while Nassy did not.

== Results ==
As there were 440 valid votes, candidates required 221 to be elected in the first round.

Candidate	Votes	%	Notes
Pieter Walther Hering	337	76.59	Re-elected
Willem Dijckmeester	296	67.27	Re-elected
Pieter Alexander May	251	57.05	Elected
Harry van Ommeren	251	57.05	Re-elected
Thomas Waller	208	47.27	
Evert Barend Johannes Luitink	151	34.32	
Total	1,494	100.00	
Valid votes	440	97.56	
Invalid/blank votes	11	2.44	
Total votes	451	100.00	
Registered voters/turnout	637	70.80	
Source: De Surinamer, Suriname, De West

== Aftermath ==
Jacques Arnold Jessurun (elected in 1914) resigned later in 1918 and was replaced by Simon Daniël de Vries.

July 1918 by-election
Candidate	Votes	%
Simon Daniël de Vries	244	50.94
Thomas Waller	235	49.06
Total	479	100.00
Valid votes	479	96.77
Invalid/blank votes	16	3.23
Total votes	495	100.00
Source: De Surinamer

Willem Dijckmeester also resigned in 1918 and was replaced by Thomas Waller.

January 1919 by-election
Candidate	Votes	%
Thomas Waller	272	61.40
H.J. de Vries	171	38.60
Total	443	100.00
Valid votes	443	98.88
Invalid/blank votes	5	1.12
Total votes	448	100.00
Source: Suriname

Hubert van Asch van Wijck (elected in 1916) resigned in 1919 and was replaced by Derk Siewert Huizinga.

May 1919 by-election
Candidate	Votes	%
Derk Siewert Huizinga	288	53.63
Albert Calor	249	46.37
Total	537	100.00
Valid votes	537	98.71
Invalid/blank votes	7	1.29
Total votes	544	100.00
Source: De West
