= 1910 Surinamese general election =

Partial general elections were held in Suriname on 21 February 1910 to elect five of the thirteen members of the Colonial States. However, there were only five candidates, who were elected unopposed.

== Electoral system ==
The elections were held using the two-round system, with suffrage restricted to men who paid a tax contribution of 60 Dutch guilders. Voters had multiple votes, and any candidate receiving a number of votes equivalent to over 50% of the valid ballots cast was elected in the first round. If not all seats were filled, a second round was held.

Candidates were elected for a six-year term with staggered elections every two years and the 1910 elections were for the five members elected in the 1904 elections. Of those five Isaac da Costa, Daniel Coutinho, Jacobus Arnoldus Dragten were still in office and ran for re-election.

Charles Ferdinand Schoch had resigned in 1905 and been replaced by Karel Hendrik Bergen, who died shortly afterwards and was replaced by John Robert Thomson. François Wijnand Hensen died in 1907 and was replaced by Raimond Nazaire Guillaume Marie Bär von Hemmersweil. He resigned in 1908 and was replaced by Franciscus Smith. Both Thomson and Smith ran for re-election.

== Results ==
As the five incumbents were the only candidates, they were declared elected unopposed.

== Aftermath ==
Coutinho resigned shortly the election due to health issues. He was replaced by Adolf Curiel, who won a by-election in June.

6–20 June 1910 by-election
Candidate	Votes	%
Adolf Curiel	227	55.10
J.M. da Costa	185	44.90
Total	412	100.00
Valid votes	412	96.04
Invalid/blank votes	17	3.96
Total votes	429	100.00
Source: Nieuwe Surinaamsche courant
