= 1936 Surinamese general election =

Partial general elections were due to be held in Suriname in 1936 to elect four of the thirteen members of the Colonial States. As there were only four candidates, all four were declared elected without a vote being required.

== Electoral system ==
The elections were held using the two-round system, with suffrage restricted to men who paid a tax contribution of 60 Dutch guilders. Voters had multiple votes, and any candidate receiving a number of votes equivalent to over 50% of the valid ballots cast was elected in the first round. If not all seats were filled, a second round was held.

Candidates were elected for a six-year term with staggered elections every two years and the 1936 elections were to replace the four members elected in the 1930 elections – Clemens Ramkisoen Biswamitre, Johannes Brons, Cornelis William Naar and Samuel Juda Samuels. Samuels had died in January 1933 and been replaced by Pieter Alexander May, while Brons had resigned in 1935 and been replaced by Karel Johannes van Erpecum.

== Results ==
The four incumbents – Biswamitre, van Erpecum, May and Naar – were the only candidates and were declared elected in February.
