= 1874 Surinamese general election =

Partial general elections were held in Suriname in March 1874 to elect three of the nine elected members of the Colonial States.

== Electoral system ==
The Colonial States consisted of nine elected members and four appointed by the Governor-General. Elected members served six-year terms, with three members elected every two years. The 1874 elections were to replace the three members elected in 1868, B.E. Colaço Belmonte, Fergus Carstairs and A.J. van Emden. However, Carstairs had resigned in 1873 and been replaced by Johannes Cateau van Rosevelt.

The elections were held using the two-round system, with suffrage restricted to men who paid a tax contribution of 60 Dutch guilders. Voters had multiple votes, and any candidate receiving a number of votes equivalent to over 50% of the valid ballots cast was elected in the first round. If not all seats were filled, a second round was held with twice the number of candidates as seats remaining, who were the candidates who received the most votes but failed to be elected in the first round.

== Results ==
As there were 125 valid ballots cast, candidates required 63 votes to be elected in the first round. All three incumbents were re-elected in the first round.

| Candidate | Votes | % | Notes |
|---|---|---|---|
| Johannes Cateau van Rosevelt | 121 | 96.80 | Re-elected |
| A.J. van Emden | 115 | 92.00 | Re-elected |
| B.E. Colaço Belmonte | 87 | 69.60 | Re-elected |
| J.M. Gilquin | 9 | 7.20 | |
| G.H. Barnet Lyon | 6 | 4.80 | |
| Frederick Paul Penard | 4 | 3.20 | |
| Henry Barnett | 4 | 3.20 | |
| Jacob Alexander Salomons | 3 | 2.40 | |
| H. Muller | 3 | 2.40 | |
| Phoebus Hitzerus Verbeek | 2 | 1.60 | |
| A.H. de Granada | 1 | 0.80 | |
| Jacob Gomperts | 1 | 0.80 | |
| Jacob van Praag | 1 | 0.80 | |
| Dr van West | 1 | 0.80 | |
| Joël Benjamin Vos | 1 | 0.80 | |
| Jacob Coenraad Gomperts | 1 | 0.80 | |
| Mozes Taytelbaum | 1 | 0.80 | |
| Isriel Aron Samuels | 1 | 0.80 | |
| Philip Jacob Heijmans | 1 | 0.80 | |
| R. Twiss | 1 | 0.80 | |
| Hendrikus Hermanus Kramer | 1 | 0.80 | |
| Johannis Philippus Haase Jr | 1 | 0.80 | |
| Charles Busken Huet | 1 | 0.80 | |
| Total | 367 | 100.00 | |
| Valid votes | 125 | 99.21 | |
| Invalid/blank votes | 1 | 0.79 | |
| Total votes | 126 | 100.00 | |
Source: Surinaamsche courant

== Aftermath ==
Governor-General Cornelis Ascanius van Sypesteyn reappointed Phoebus Hitzerus Verbeek and appointed three new nominated members, G.J.A. Bosch Reitz, Joël Benjamin Vos and Jacob Evert Wesenhagen.

The newly elected States met for the first time on 12 May 1874, with Bosch Reitz appointed chairman.

E.F.L. Mollinger, who had been elected in 1872 resigned in April, after the elections had taken place. His seat was left unfilled until July, when he was replaced by David Baëza. N.T.A. Arlaud, who had been elected in 1870, died in October 1874 and was replaced by Henry Barnett. Nominated member Verbeek resigned in January 1875, while fellow nominee Wesenhagen died in March 1875. The two were replaced by Karel Daniel Brakke and Jacobus de Jong in May. In the same month, Daniel Benjamins (elected in 1870) resigned; in June he was replaced by the returning Verbeek.

In December 1875 David Baëza died, and was replaced the following month by Jacob Alexander Salomons. Johannes Cornelis Muller, elected in 1872, resigned in February 1876 and was replaced by G.H. Barnet Lyon.
