= 1928 Surinamese general election =

Partial general elections were held in Suriname in March 1928 to elect five of the thirteen members of the Colonial States.

== Electoral system ==
The elections were held using the two-round system, with suffrage restricted to men who paid a tax contribution of 60 Dutch guilders. Voters had multiple votes, and any candidate receiving a number of votes equivalent to over 50% of the valid ballots cast was elected in the first round. If not all seats were filled, a second round was held.

Candidates were elected for a six-year term with staggered elections every two years and the 1928 elections were to replace the five members elected in the 1922 elections. Three of the five – Anton Dragten, Pieter Alexander May and Richard O'Ferrall – were still in office. Robert David Simons and Simon Daniël de Vries had resigned in 1926 and been replaced by Albert Gustaaf Putscher and Henry George William de Miranda.

De Miranda, Dragten, May and Putchser ran for re-election.

== Results ==
As there were 838 valid votes, candidates required 420 to be elected in the first round.

Candidate	Votes	%	Notes
Anton Dragten	635	75.78	Re-elected
Pieter Alexander May	601	71.72	Re-elected
Henry George William de Miranda	562	67.06	Re-elected
William Kraan	497	59.31	Elected
Albert Gustaaf Putscher	463	55.25	Re-elected
Alfred Morpurgo	372	44.39	
Total	3,130	100.00	
Valid votes	838	92.60	
Invalid/blank votes	67	7.40	
Total votes	905	100.00	
Registered voters/turnout	1,391	65.06	
Source: De West

== Aftermath ==
Karel Johannes van Erpecum (elected in 1924) resigned in 1929 and was replaced by Cornelis William Naar in an August 1929 by-election.

Candidate	Votes	%
Cornelis William Naar	287	73.78
Philip Samson	102	26.22
Total	389	100.00
Valid votes	389	91.96
Invalid/blank votes	34	8.04
Total votes	423	100.00
Source: De West

Pierre Antoine Augustin Bucaille (elected in 1926) left Suriname in 1929 and was replaced by Philip Samson in a September 1929 by-election.

Candidate	Votes	%
Philip Samson	338	67.20
Alfred Morpurgo	165	32.80
Total	503	100.00
Valid votes	503	94.19
Invalid/blank votes	31	5.81
Total votes	534	100.00
Source: De Surinamer
