= 1932 Surinamese general election =

Partial general elections were held in Suriname in March 1932 to elect four of the thirteen members of the Colonial States.

== Electoral system ==
The elections were held using the two-round system, with suffrage restricted to men who paid a tax contribution of 60 Dutch guilders. Voters had multiple votes, and any candidate receiving a number of votes equivalent to over 50% of the valid ballots cast was elected in the first round. If not all seats were filled, a second round was held.

Candidates were elected for a six-year term with staggered elections every two years and the 1932 elections were to replace the four members elected in the 1926 elections. Only two of them – Frederik Pieter Schuitemaker and Ernst Snellen – were still in office; H.G. Brandon had resigned shortly after being elected and been replaced by David Simons, while Pierre Antoine Augustin Bucaille left Suriname in 1929 and was replaced by Philip Samson. Only Samson and Simons ran for re-election.

== Results ==
As there were 556 valid votes, candidates required 279 to be elected in the first round.

Candidate	Votes	%	Notes
David Simons	465	83.63	Re-elected
Julius Caesar de Miranda	338	60.79	Elected
Philip Samson	323	58.09	Re-elected
Julius del Prado	322	57.91	Elected
G.E. Brunings	217	39.03	
Total	1,665	100.00	
Valid votes	556	94.24	
Invalid/blank votes	34	5.76	
Total votes	590	100.00	
Registered voters/turnout	1,338	44.10	
Source: De West

== Aftermath ==
Later in 1932 Anton Dragten (elected in 1928) resigned and was replaced by Gerson Philip Zaal who won a by-election in July and August.

Candidate	First round		Second round	
Candidate	Votes	%	Votes	%
Gerson Philip Zaal	305	49.27	383	62.38
Leo Lauriers	194	31.34	231	37.62
A.J. May	86	13.89		
F. Woisky	34	5.49		
Total	619	100.00	614	100.00
Valid votes	619	93.93	614	95.49
Invalid/blank votes	40	6.07	29	4.51
Total votes	659	100.00	643	100.00
Source: Suriname, De Surinamer

Pieter Alexander May (elected in 1928) also resigned in 1932 and was replaced by Karel Johannes van Erpecum of the People's Party, who was elected unopposed in September.

Samuel Juda Samuels (elected in 1930) died in January 1933 and was replaced by the returning May, who was elected unopposed in February.
