= 1912 Surinamese general election =

Partial general elections were held in Suriname in March and April 1912 to elect four of the thirteen members of the Colonial States.

== Electoral system ==
The elections were held using the two-round system, with suffrage restricted to men who paid a tax contribution of 60 Dutch guilders. Voters had multiple votes, and any candidate receiving a number of votes equivalent to over 50% of the valid ballots cast was elected in the first round. If not all seats were filled, a second round was held.

Candidates were elected for a six-year term with staggered elections every two years and the 1912 elections were for the four members elected in the 1906 elections. Of those four, Samuel Bueno Bibaz, Frits Curiel and Reinbertus Aloisius Tammenga were still in office, while Frans Carel Gefken had died in 1909 and been replaced by Lucas Lubbertus Beckeringh van Loenen.

Only Bibaz and Beckeringh van Loenen ran for re-election.

== Results ==
As there were 359 valid votes, candidates required 180 to be elected in the first round.

Candidate	First round		Second round		Notes
Candidate	Votes	%	Votes	%	Notes
Lucas Lubbertus Beckeringh van Loenen	289	80.50			Re-elected
Samuel Bueno Bibaz	225	62.67			Re-elected
Eduard Zeiler	206	57.38			Elected
Pieter Alexander May	169	47.08	97	48.26	
Dirk Olthuis	152	42.34	104	51.74	Elected
L.R. Worst	107	29.81			
Total	1,148	100.00	201	100.00	
Valid votes	359	95.48	201	96.63	
Invalid/blank votes	17	4.52	7	3.37	
Total votes	376	100.00	208	100.00	
Registered voters/turnout	665	56.54	665	31.28	
Source: De Surinamer

== Aftermath ==
Franciscus Smith (elected in 1910) resigned in 1912 and was replaced by Pieter Alexander May.

October 1912 by-election
Candidate	Votes	%
Pieter Alexander May	157	61.57
Wilhelmus Nicolaas Stephanus Arntz	98	38.43
Total	255	100.00
Valid votes	255	97.70
Invalid/blank votes	6	2.30
Total votes	261	100.00
Registered voters/turnout	665	39.25
Source: De Surinamer

Theophilius Libertador Ellis (elected in 1908) died in 1913. Jacques Arnold Jessurun was the only candidate nominated for the by-election and was declared elected unopposed in June.

August Richard Bueno (elected in 1908) resigned in 1913 and was replaced by William Kraan.

November 1913 by-election
Candidate	Votes	%
William Kraan	210	59.49
P. Hilfman	99	28.05
L.C.C. Schütz	44	12.46
Total	353	100.00
Valid votes	353	91.93
Invalid/blank votes	31	8.07
Total votes	384	100.00
Registered voters/turnout	649	59.17
Source: Suriname

Eduard Zeiler resigned in 1914. Hendrik Salm was the only candidate nominated to replace him and was elected unopposed.
