= 1920 Surinamese general election =

Partial general elections were held in Suriname in February 1920 to elect four of the thirteen members of the Colonial States.

== Electoral system ==
The elections were held using the two-round system, with suffrage restricted to men who paid a tax contribution of 60 Dutch guilders. Voters had multiple votes, and any candidate receiving a number of votes equivalent to over 50% of the valid ballots cast was elected in the first round. If not all seats were filled, a second round was held.

Candidates were elected for a six-year term with staggered elections every two years and the 1920 elections were for the four members elected in the 1914 elections. However, only one of the four (William Kraan) was still in office;

Pieter Walther Hering had resigned shortly after the election due to controversy over his nomination, and had been replaced by August Richard Bueno. Harry van Ommeren had also resigned in 1914 and been replaced by Justus Rinia Cornelis Gonggrijp. Jacques Arnold Jessurun resigned in 1918 and was replaced by Simon Daniël de Vries.

Kraan and Gonggrijp were the only two of the incumbents to run for re-election.

== Results ==
There were only four candidates for the four vacant seats, with Kraan, Gonggrijp, Hubert Johan Terheggen and J. Vogt declared elected unopposed in February.

== Aftermath ==
Before the new States met in May, three other incumbent members resigned; Pieter Alexander May was replaced by Pierre Antoine Augustin Bucaille, who was declared elected unopposed. There were three candidates for the two seats vacated by Adolf Curiel and Robert David Simons, with Jozias Jacob Leys and Pieter Westra elected.

| Candidate | Votes | % |
|---|---|---|
| Jozias Jacob Leys | 227 | 56.19 |
| Pieter Westra | 220 | 54.46 |
| J.J. Weeda | 169 | 41.83 |
| Total | 616 | 100.00 |
| Valid votes | 404 | 97.82 |
| Invalid/blank votes | 9 | 2.18 |
| Total votes | 413 | 100.00 |
Source: De West

Three members (including two of those elected in 1920) resigned in 1921; Jacobus Arnoldus Dragten (elected in 1916) was replaced by Helenus Agricola Pet, who was declared elected unopposed in May. Vogt was replaced by Egbertus Rudolf de Vries and Westra was replaced by Albert Gustaaf Putscher, both of whom were declared elected unopposed.
