= 1926 Surinamese general election =

Partial general elections were held in Suriname in March 1926 to elect four of the thirteen members of the Colonial States.

== Electoral system ==
The elections were held using the two-round system, with suffrage restricted to men who paid a tax contribution of 60 Dutch guilders. Voters had multiple votes, and any candidate receiving a number of votes equivalent to over 50% of the valid ballots cast was elected in the first round. If not all seats were filled, a second round was held.

Candidates were elected for a six-year term with staggered elections every two years and the 1926 elections were for the four members elected in the 1920 elections. William Kraan, Justus Rinia Cornelis Gonggrijp and Hubert Johan Terheggen were still in office but J. Vogt had resigned in 1921 and been replaced by Egbertus Rudolf de Vries.

Of the four incumbents, only Kraan and Gonggrijp ran for re-election

== Results ==
As there were 578 valid votes, candidates required 290 to be elected in the first round. Both incumbents lost their seats.

Candidate	Votes	%	Notes
H.G. Brandon	445	76.99	Elected
Frederik Pieter Schuitemaker	433	74.91	Elected
Pierre Antoine Augustin Bucaille	390	67.47	Elected
Ernst Snellen	355	61.42	Elected
William Kraan	287	49.65	Unseated
Justus Rinia Cornelis Gonggrijp	140	24.22	Unseated
Total	2,050	100.00	
Valid votes	578	98.30	
Invalid/blank votes	10	1.70	
Total votes	588	100.00	
Source: De West

== Aftermath ==
Robert David Simons and Simon Daniël de Vries, both elected in 1922, resigned in 1926. They were replaced by Albert Gustaaf Putscher and Henry George William de Miranda, who were elected unopposed in June. H.G. Brandon resigned later in the same year and was replaced by David Simons, who was elected unopposed.

Thomas Waller, elected in 1924, resigned in 1927 and was replaced by Carel Laurens Cool, who was also elected unopposed.
