= 1922 Surinamese general election =

Partial general elections were held in Suriname in March, April and May 1922 to elect five of the thirteen members of the Colonial States.

== Electoral system ==
The elections were held using the two-round system, with suffrage restricted to men who paid a tax contribution of 60 Dutch guilders. Voters had multiple votes, and any candidate receiving a number of votes equivalent to over 50% of the valid ballots cast was elected in the first round. If not all seats were filled, a second round was held.

Candidates were elected for a six-year term with staggered elections every two years and the 1922 elections were for the five members elected in the 1916 elections. However, only one of them – John Robert Thomson – was still in office; Hubert van Asch van Wijck had resigned in 1919 and been replaced by Derk Siewert Huizinga, Robert David Simons and Adolf Curiel both resigned in 1920 and had been replaced by Jozias Jacob Leys and Pieter Westra (Westra also subsequently resigned and was replaced by Albert Gustaaf Putscher), and Jacobus Arnoldus Dragten had resigned in 1921 and been replaced by Helenus Agricola Pet.

Of the five incumbents, three (Huizinga, Leys and Putscher) ran for re-election, while Simons returned to politics to run again.

== Results ==
As there were 1,051 valid votes, candidates required 526 to be elected in the first round. Only four candidates passed the threshold, with a second round required to be held between the next two most voted-for candidates.

All incumbents lost their seats, the first time no incumbent member had retained their seat in Surinamese electoral history.

Candidate	First round		Second round		Notes
Candidate	Votes	%	Votes	%	Notes
Robert David Simons	887	84.40			Elected
Simon Daniël de Vries	680	64.70			Elected
Pieter Alexander May	571	54.33			Elected
Anton Dragten	545	51.86			Elected
Derk Siewert Huizinga	481	45.77	472	47.77	Unseated
Richard O'Ferrall	450	42.82	516	52.23	Elected
Jacques Drielsma	398	37.87			
J.W.F. Vrielink	391	37.20			
Jozias Jacob Leys	334	31.78			Unseated
Albert Gustaaf Putscher	298	28.35			Unseated
Total	5,035	100.00	988	100.00	
Valid votes	1,051	96.42	988	97.73	
Invalid/blank votes	39	3.58	23	2.27	
Total votes	1,090	100.00	1,011	100.00	
Source: De West, De Surinamer

== Aftermath ==
Harry van Ommeren (elected in 1918) died in 1923 and was replaced by Jacques Drielsma, who was declared elected unopposed.
