= 1901 Surinamese general election =

Supplementary general elections were held in Suriname in May 1901 to elect four of the thirteen members of the Colonial States. The elections followed reforms to the States that replaced the four members appointed by the Governor-General with elected members.

== Electoral system ==
The elections were held using the two-round system, with suffrage restricted to men who paid a tax contribution of 60 Dutch guilders. Voters had multiple votes, and any candidate receiving a number of votes equivalent to over 50% of the valid ballots cast was elected in the first round. If not all seats were filled, a second round was held.

== Results ==
As there were 196 valid ballots cast, candidates required 99 votes to be elected in the first round.

Three of the four outgoing appointed members ran for election; Isaac da Costa, Adrianus van 't Hoogerhuys and Reinbertus Aloisius Tammenga, all of whom were successful. Samuel Muller van Voorst was also elected.

Candidate	Votes	%	Notes
Adrianus van 't Hoogerhuys	166	84.69	Elected
Isaac da Costa	147	75.00	Elected
Samuel Muller van Voorst	142	72.45	Elected
Reinbertus Aloisius Tammenga	122	62.24	Elected
J.E. Aberbanel	18	9.18	
Richard O'Ferrall	17	8.67	
Jacques Bernard Nassy	17	8.67	
A.J. Baron Schimmelpenninck van de Oije	12	6.12	
D. Geester	10	5.10	
W. van Voss	9	4.59	
Dahlberg	8	4.08	
J.J. Halfhide	8	4.08	
Francis Ellis	5	2.55	
Libanon	5	2.55	
Karel Hendrik Bergen	4	2.04	
J. Bakker	3	1.53	
Graaf van Heerdt tot Eversberg	2	1.02	
Van der Houven van Oordt	2	1.02	
John Robert Thomson	2	1.02	
J.A. Gonggrijp	2	1.02	
S. Gonggrijp	2	1.02	
S.H. Pos	2	1.02	
F.P. Sevenoaks	2	1.02	
Westmaas	2	1.02	
J. Hering	2	1.02	
J. Reiziger	1	0.51	
Alexander Ferrier Wilmans	1	0.51	
J. Mavor	1	0.51	
H.M. Simons	1	0.51	
P.A. Bruggeman	1	0.51	
A.E. Tjin-kon-fat	1	0.51	
W.T. Liems	1	0.51	
R.C. Buth	1	0.51	
Lo-Anam	1	0.51	
Wong-A-Sie	1	0.51	
J. Schomaker	1	0.51	
F. Stähelin	1	0.51	
Rijsdijk	1	0.51	
Veldhuizen	1	0.51	
Ravenswaai	1	0.51	
Notaris Cabell	1	0.51	
B. Heijde	1	0.51	
J. Polak	1	0.51	
Majoor Brouwer	1	0.51	
J.L. Engelbrecht	1	0.51	
Hermann Esser	1	0.51	
Bueno de Mesquita	1	0.51	
J.C. Weidner	1	0.51	
A.H. Zuschen	1	0.51	
F. Eyckmans	1	0.51	
Total	736	100.00	
Valid votes	196	97.51	
Invalid/blank votes	5	2.49	
Total votes	201	100.00	
Source: De Surinamer
