= 1924 Surinamese general election =

Partial general elections were held in Suriname in March and April 1924 to elect four of the thirteen members of the Colonial States.

== Electoral system ==
The elections were held using the two-round system, with suffrage restricted to men who paid a tax contribution of 60 Dutch guilders. Voters had multiple votes, and any candidate receiving a number of votes equivalent to over 50% of the valid ballots cast was elected in the first round. If not all seats were filled, a second round was held.

Candidates were elected for a six-year term with staggered elections every two years and the 1924 elections were for the four members elected in the 1918 elections. However, only one of them – Pieter Walther Hering – was still in office; Willem Dijckmeester had resigned in 1919 and been replaced by Thomas Waller, Pieter Alexander May had resigned in 1920 and been replaced by and Pierre Antoine Augustin Bucaille, while Harry van Ommeren died in 1923 and was replaced by Jacques Drielsma.

Of the four incumbents, Hering, Waller and Drielsma ran for re-election, while Bucaille did not contest the elections.

== Results ==
As there were 1,023 valid votes, candidates required 512 to be elected in the first round. Only Jacques Drielsma passed the threshold, with a second round required to be held between the next six most voted-for candidates.

Candidate	First round		Second round		Notes
Candidate	Votes	%	Votes	%	Notes
Jacques Drielsma	592	57.87			Re-elected
Pieter Walther Hering	491	48.00	625	64.37	Re-elected
Karel Johannes van Erpecum	470	45.94	534	54.99	Elected
Thomas Waller	355	34.70	439	45.21	Re-elected
Cornelis William Naar	343	33.53	401	41.30	
A.L. Waaldijk	329	32.16	380	39.13	
M.H. Stephan	329	32.16	346	35.63	
C.S. Loe	286	27.96			
G.R. de la Fuente	281	27.47			
E.M. Rombouts	230	22.48			
Total	3,706	100.00	2,725	100.00	
Valid votes	1,023	95.70	971	95.76	
Invalid/blank votes	46	4.30	43	4.24	
Total votes	1,069	100.00	1,014	100.00	
Source: Suriname, De West

== Aftermath ==
Pieter Walther Hering died in June 1925. Samuel Juda Samuels was elected unopposed to replace him.
