= 1914 Surinamese general election =

Partial general elections were held in Suriname in February 1914 to elect four of the thirteen members of the Colonial States.

== Electoral system ==
The elections were held using the two-round system, with suffrage restricted to men who paid a tax contribution of 60 Dutch guilders. Voters had multiple votes, and any candidate receiving a number of votes equivalent to over 50% of the valid ballots cast was elected in the first round. If not all seats were filled, a second round was held.

Candidates were elected for a six-year term with staggered elections every two years and the 1914 elections were for the four members elected in the 1908 elections. Only one of those (Roelof Fabriek) was still in office; Adrianus van 't Hoogerhuys had resigned later in 1908 and been replaced by Harry van Ommeren, Theophilius Libertador Ellis had died in 1913 and been replaced by Jacques Arnold Jessurun, while August Richard Bueno had resigned the same year and been replaced by William Kraan.

Fabriek was the only one of the four incumbents not to run for re-election.

== Results ==
There were only four candidates for the four seats available (van Ommeren, Jessurun, Kraan and Pieter Walther Hering). As a result, they were declared elected unopposed.

== Aftermath ==
There was a significant turnover of members during the 1914–1916 term, with eight of the thirteen members resigning (and two of those who resigned subsequently returning after winning by-elections).

Hering resigned in July 1914, after it emerged that his name had been added to a nomination list after it had been signed by several people. He was replaced by August Richard Bueno, who was elected unopposed.

Samuel Bueno Bibaz (elected in 1912) also resigned in 1914 and was replaced by Adolf Nassy, who defeated Hering in a by-election.

September 1914 by-election
Candidate	Votes	%
Adolf Nassy	136	71.58
Pieter Walther Hering	54	28.42
Total	190	100.00
Valid votes	190	96.45
Invalid/blank votes	7	3.55
Total votes	197	100.00
Source: Suriname

However, after Lucas Lubbertus Beckeringh van Loenen resigned later in 1914, Hering won the subsequent by-election.

November 1914 by-election
Candidate	Votes	%
Pieter Walther Hering	139	60.17
H.L. Hirschfeld	92	39.83
Total	231	100.00
Valid votes	231	95.85
Invalid/blank votes	10	4.15
Total votes	241	100.00
Source: Suriname

Pieter Alexander May and Harry van Ommeren also resigned in 1914 and were replaced by Wilhelmus Nicolaas Stephanus Arntz and Justus Rinia Cornelis Gonggrijp respectively, with both replacement declared elected unopposed in December.

Isaac da Costa resigned in 1915 and was replaced by Hubert van Asch van Wijck, who was declared elected unopposed in February. Hendrik Salm (elected in a 1914 by-election) also resigned in 1915 and was replaced by Willem Dijckmeester, who was declared elected unopposed in June.

Dirk Olthuis resigned later in 1915 and was replaced by the returning van Ommeren.

December 1915 by-election
Candidate	Votes	%
Harry van Ommeren	198	58.58
Thomas Waller	140	41.42
Total	338	100.00
Valid votes	338	96.02
Invalid/blank votes	14	3.98
Total votes	352	100.00
Registered voters/turnout	635	55.43
Source: De Surinamer
