= 1876 Surinamese general election =

Partial general elections were held in Suriname in March 1876 to elect three of the nine elected members of the Colonial States.

== Electoral system ==
The Colonial States consisted of nine elected members and four appointed by the Governor-General. Elected members served six-year terms, with three members elected every two years. The 1876 elections were to replace the three members elected in 1870, Daniel Benjamins, G.J.A. Bosch Reitz and N.T.A. Arlaud. However, none of the three were still members by 1876; Bosch Reitz was replaced by A.J. da Costa in 1873, Arlaud died in 1874 and was replaced by Henry Barnett, while Benjamins resigned in 1875 and was replaced by Phoebus Hitzerus Verbeek.

The elections were held using the two-round system, with suffrage restricted to men who paid a tax contribution of 60 Dutch guilders. Voters had multiple votes, and any candidate receiving a number of votes equivalent to over 50% of the valid ballots cast was elected in the first round. If not all seats were filled, a second round was held with twice the number of candidates as seats remaining, who were the candidates who received the most votes but failed to be elected in the first round.

== Results ==
As there were 94 valid ballots cast, candidates required 48 votes to be elected in the first round. All three incumbents were easily re-elected in the first round.

Candidate	Votes	%	Notes
Phoebus Hitzerus Verbeek	83	88.30	Re-elected
A.J. da Costa	73	77.66	Re-elected
Henry Barnett	72	76.60	Re-elected
Alexander Constantijn Wesenhegen	12	12.77	
Salomon Aberdanon Heilbron	4	4.26	
H.S. Schonten	4	4.26	
Cornelis Johannes Heylidy	2	2.13	
M.A. Smitter	2	2.13	
Charles Busken Huet	1	1.06	
L.E. du Coral	1	1.06	
H.W.D. Donker Curtius	1	1.06	
Johannis Philippus Haase Jr	1	1.06	
Jan Philippus Albertus Hoeffelman	1	1.06	
Jurriaan Antonie Jurriaanse	1	1.06	
Willem Johannis Gijsbertus Labad	1	1.06	
Rudolph Hendrik Leijsner	1	1.06	
Jacob Nicolaas Eckhardt de Mesquita	1	1.06	
Jb. Nassij	1	1.06	
Frederick Paul Penard	1	1.06	
B.M. Samson	1	1.06	
E. Sander	1	1.06	
Johannis Sander	1	1.06	
Jacobus Benjamin Pedro Louis Seiler	1	1.06	
Marius Simons	1	1.06	
R.J. Simons	1	1.06	
W.A. Wijnschenk	1	1.06	
Total	270	100.00	
Valid votes	94	95.92	
Invalid votes	1	1.02	
Blank votes	3	3.06	
Total votes	98	100.00	
Source: Koloniaal nieuws

== Aftermath ==
Governor-General Cornelis Ascanius van Sypesteyn reappointed G.J.A. Bosch Reitz, Karel Daniel Brakke and Jacobus de Jong as nominated members, together with J.F. Saile Vanier.

The newly elected States met for the first time on 11 May 1876, with Bosch Reitz remaining chairman. However, he resigned later in the year and was replaced by Jurriaan Antonie Jurriaanse. De Jong took over as chairman until he and Jurriaanse resigned from the States in 1877. They were replaced by Joël Benjamin Vos and Coenraad van Lier, with A.J. van Emden taking over as chairman.
