= 1882 Surinamese general election =

Partial general elections were held in Suriname in March and April 1882 to elect three of the nine elected members of the Colonial States.

== Electoral system ==
The Colonial States consisted of nine elected members and four appointed by the Governor-General. Elected members served six-year terms, with three members elected every two years. The 1882 elections were to replace the three members elected in 1876, Phoebus Hitzerus Verbeek, A.J. da Costa and Henry Barnett. Verbeek had resigned in 1880 and been replaced by Arend d'Angremond.

The elections were held using the two-round system, with suffrage restricted to men who paid a tax contribution of 60 Dutch guilders. Voters had multiple votes, and any candidate receiving a number of votes equivalent to over 50% of the valid ballots cast was elected in the first round. If not all seats were filled, a second round was held with twice the number of candidates as seats remaining, who were the candidates who received the most votes but failed to be elected in the first round.

== Results ==
As there were 145 valid ballots cast, candidates required 73 votes to be elected in the first round. Incumbent Barnett and A.H. de Granada were elected in the first round, while F.W. Westerouen van Meeteren missed out on being elected by a single vote. He and incumbent da Costa contested the second round, in which they were tied on 88 votes. Da Costa was declared elected on the basis that he was the older of the two candidates.

Candidate	First round		Second round		Notes
Candidate	Votes	%	Votes	%	Notes
Henry Barnett	85	58.62			Re-elected
A.H. de Granada	80	55.17			Elected
F.W. Westerouen van Meeteren	72	49.66	88	50.00	
A.J. da Costa	60	41.38	88	50.00	Re-elected
Willem August van Emden	44	30.34			
Eduard Adriaan Cabell	38	26.21			
H.Z. van Campen	3	2.07			
J. Coronel	3	2.07			
Isak Aron Samuels	3	2.07			
Thomas Godlieb Smith	3	2.07			
H.D. Benjamins	2	1.38			
J. Gans	2	1.38			
Jan Philippus Albertus Hoeffelman	2	1.38			
G.H. Samson	2	1.38			
François Philemon Bouguenon	1	0.69			
C.M. Bremner	1	0.69			
James Delmonte Lijon	1	0.69			
Johannis Philippus Haase Jr	1	0.69			
G.P. Heilbron	1	0.69			
H.C.W. Polak	1	0.69			
Alexander Samuel Samuels	1	0.69			
Isak Nathan Samuels	1	0.69			
M. Schotman	1	0.69			
H. Schouten	1	0.69			
David Isak Simons	1	0.69			
A. Smith Thomson	1	0.69			
Jaques de Vries	1	0.69			
Johannis Jacobus Pierre Wessels	1	0.69			
Johannis Cornelius Zaalberg Pauluszoon	1	0.69			
Total	414	100.00	176	100.00	
Valid votes	145	98.64	176	99.44	
Invalid votes	0	0.00	0	0.00	
Blank votes	2	1.36	1	0.56	
Total votes	147	100.00	177	100.00	
Source: De West-Indiër, Surinaamsche courant

== Aftermath ==
Governor-General Cornelis Ascanius van Sypesteyn reappointed David Juda and J.F. Saile Vanier as nominated members, together with G.A.H. Knoch and formerly elected member Arend d'Angremond.

The newly elected States met for the first time on 9 May 1882, with Juda remaining chairman.

D'Angremond resigned in 1883 when he left Suriname and was replaced by Wouterus van Esveld.
