= 1878 Surinamese general election =

Partial general elections were held in Suriname in March 1878 to elect three of the nine elected members of the Colonial States.

== Electoral system ==
The Colonial States consisted of nine elected members and four appointed by the Governor-General. Elected members served six-year terms, with three members elected every two years. The 1878 elections were to replace the three members elected in 1872, F.H. van Affelen van Oorde, E.F.L. Mollinger and Johannes Cornelis Muller. However, none of the three were still members by 1878; van Oorde resigned in September 1872 and was replaced by Semuel van Praag, Mollinger resigned in 1874 and was replaced by David Baëza (who died the following year and was replaced by Jacob Alexander Salomons), while Muller resigned in 1876 and was replaced by G.H. Barnet Lyon.

The elections were held using the two-round system, with suffrage restricted to men who paid a tax contribution of 60 Dutch guilders. Voters had multiple votes, and any candidate receiving a number of votes equivalent to over 50% of the valid ballots cast was elected in the first round. If not all seats were filled, a second round was held with twice the number of candidates as seats remaining, who were the candidates who received the most votes but failed to be elected in the first round.

== Results ==
As there were 131 valid ballots cast, candidates required 66 votes to be elected in the first round. Incumbents Barnet Lyon and Salomons, together with Charles Busken Huet, were easily elected in the first round, while van Praag received just 15 votes and lost his seat.

Candidate	Votes	%	Notes
G.H. Barnet Lyon	117	89.31	Re-elected
Charles Busken Huet	111	84.73	Elected
Jacob Alexander Salomons	100	76.34	Re-elected
Semuel van Praag	15	11.45	Unseated
J. Gans	8	6.11	
Frederick Paul Penard	6	4.58	
S. van Lierop	4	3.05	
Henri Muller	3	2.29	
C.M. Bremer	2	1.53	
J.C. Hartman Jr	2	1.53	
H.D. Benjamins	2	1.53	
Hendrikus Hermanus Kramer	1	0.76	
James Delmonte Lijon	1	0.76	
J. Colaço Belmonte	1	0.76	
C.J.W.N. van Hengst	1	0.76	
Rudolph Hendrik Leijsner	1	0.76	
A.H. de Granada	1	0.76	
Total	376	100.00	
Valid votes	131	97.04	
Invalid votes	0	0.00	
Blank votes	4	2.96	
Total votes	135	100.00	
Source: Suriname

== Aftermath ==
Governor-General Cornelis Ascanius van Sypesteyn reappointed Karel Daniel Brakke, J.F. Saile Vanier and Joël Benjamin Vos as nominated members, together with new member David Juda

The newly elected States met for the first time on 14 May 1878, with A.J. van Emden initially remaining chairman However, he stepped down from the role a month later. He was not replaced for a year, until David Juda became chairman in May 1879.

Busken Huet resigned just two days after the States opened and was replaced by Marcus Samson van Praag.
