= 1894 Surinamese general election =

Partial general elections were held in Suriname on 25 March and in April 1894 to elect four of the nine elected members of the Colonial States.

== Electoral system ==
The Colonial States consisted of nine elected members and four appointed by the Governor-General. Elected members served six-year terms, with three members elected every two years. The 1894 elections were to replace the three members elected in 1888, A.H. de Granada, Hendrikus d'Angremond and Julius Muller. All three ran for re-election. There was also a by-election for the elected seat vacated by Christiaan Hendrik van Meurs who had been overseas due to ill-health. However, van Meurs had returned and was running for re-election.

The elections were held using the two-round system, with suffrage restricted to men who paid a tax contribution of 60 Dutch guilders. Voters had multiple votes, and any candidate receiving a number of votes equivalent to over 50% of the valid ballots cast was elected in the first round. If not all seats were filled, a second round was held.

== Results ==
As there were 225 valid ballots cast, candidates required 113 votes to be elected in the first round. Muller was easily re-elected, while de Granada received exactly the 113 needed to avoid a run-off. One was required between the third- and fourth-placed candidates Theophilius Libertador Ellis and Guillaume Jean Vanier. Both also ran in the second round of the simultaneous by-election, with Vanier elected in the main run-off and Ellis in the by-election.

Candidate	First round		Second round		Notes
Candidate	Votes	%	Votes	%	Notes
Julius Muller	190	84.44			Re-elected
A.H. de Granada	113	50.22			Re-elected
Theophilius Libertador Ellis	92	40.89	29	14.01	
Guillaume Jean Vanier	80	35.56	176	85.02	Elected
Hendrikus d'Angremond	60	26.67			Unseated
Daniel Coutinho	60	26.67			
J.J. Heilbron	6	2.67			
Christiaan Hendrik van Meurs	5	2.22	1	0.48	
J.L. Hijmans	3	1.33			
A.E.J.W. Juta	3	1.33			
A.J. Jessurun	3	1.33			
A.A. ter Laag	3	1.33			
L.C. van Amson	3	1.33			
R.H. Leijsner	2	0.89			
J.F. Spiering	2	0.89			
Justus Gonggrijp	2	0.89			
John Fredrik Green	2	0.89			
Frits Curiel	1	0.44			
F.A. del Prado	1	0.44			
François Wijnand Hensen	1	0.44			
W.E. van Emden	1	0.44			
Samuel Muller van Voorst	1	0.44			
J. van West	1	0.44			
Carel Bergen	1	0.44			
S.H. Pos	1	0.44			
J. da Costa	1	0.44			
von Weiler	1	0.44			
W.L. Loth	1	0.44			
H.A.R.H. Leijsner	1	0.44			
J.J.P. Wessels	1	0.44			
C.F. Aalsmeer	1	0.44			
L.J. Hertzberger	1	0.44			
Jacques Bernard Nassy	1	0.44			
R.B. Bibaz	1	0.44			
F. van Ghert Jr	1	0.44			
George Henry Barnet Lyon	1	0.44			
Eduard Adriaan Cabell	1	0.44			
J.P.W. van Eyck			1	0.48	
Total	649	100.00	207	100.00	
Valid votes	225	99.56	207	92.41	
Invalid votes	0	0.00	0	0.00	
Blank votes	1	0.44	17	7.59	
Total votes	226	100.00	224	100.00	
Source: Suriname, De Surinamer

=== By-election ===
In the by-election for the seat vacated by Christiaan Hendrik van Meurs, Theophilius Libertador Ellis was elected in the second round.

Candidate	First round		Second round		Notes
Candidate	Votes	%	Votes	%	Notes
Theophilius Libertador Ellis	91	40.81	114	51.12	Elected
Christiaan Hendrik van Meurs	69	30.94	108	48.43	
Daniel Coutinho	29	13.00			
Guillaume Jean Vanier	11	4.93	1	0.45	
J.J. Heilbron	9	4.04			
A.H. de Granada	3	1.35			
G.J.J. Karg	2	0.90			
Wouterus van Esveld	2	0.90			
R.H. Leijsner	2	0.90			
J.P. van den Corput	1	0.45			
Jacques Bernard Nassy	1	0.45			
W.A. van Emden	1	0.45			
D. de Boer	1	0.45			
Frits Curiel	1	0.45			
Total	223	100.00	223	100.00	
Valid votes	223	92.92	223	99.11	
Invalid votes	0	0.00	0	0.00	
Blank votes	17	7.08	2	0.89	
Total votes	240	100.00	225	100.00	
Source: Suriname De Surinamer

== Aftermath ==
The Governor-General reappointed Isaac da Costa, David Juda and Salomon Matthijs Swijt as nominated members, together with Adrianus van 't Hoogerhuys. Juda remained chairman.

In 1895 a by-election was held to replace Henry Barnett, with Justus Gonggrijp elected with 94 of the 181 valid votes cast.
