= 1888 Surinamese general election =

Partial general elections were held in Suriname in March 1888 to elect three of the nine elected members of the Colonial States.

== Electoral system ==
The Colonial States consisted of nine elected members and four appointed by the Governor-General. Elected members served six-year terms, with three members elected every two years. The 1888 elections were to replace the three members elected in 1882, Henry Barnett, A.H. de Granada and A.J. da Costa, all three of whom ran for re-election.

The elections were held using the two-round system, with suffrage restricted to men who paid a tax contribution of 60 Dutch guilders. Voters had multiple votes, and any candidate receiving a number of votes equivalent to over 50% of the valid ballots cast was elected in the first round. If not all seats were filled, a second round was held with twice the number of candidates as seats remaining, who were the candidates who received the most votes but failed to be elected in the first round.

== Results ==
As there were 221 valid ballots cast, candidates required 111 votes to be elected in the first round. Two of the three incumbents were unseated.

Candidate	Votes	%	Notes
A.H. de Granada	158	71.49	Re-elected
Hendrikus d'Angremond	116	52.49	Elected
Julius Muller	112	50.68	Elected
A.J. da Costa	72	32.58	Unseated
Christiaan Hendrik van Meurs	46	20.81	
A.J. Jessurun	38	17.19	
C.M. Bremner	23	10.41	
Salomon Matthijs Swijt	17	7.69	
Henry Barnett	13	5.88	Unseated
A.E.J.W. Juta	10	4.52	
Eduard Adriaan Cabell	7	3.17	
J. Gans	6	2.71	
J.M. Samson	5	2.26	
G.P. Heilbron	2	0.90	
R. Bueno de Mesquita	2	0.90	
H. Benjamins	2	0.90	
G.C. Steijnis	2	0.90	
Frits Curiel	2	0.90	
Jacques de Vries	2	0.90	
J.H. de Granada	1	0.45	
J.A. Nassy	1	0.45	
J.S. Morpurgo	1	0.45	
J.N. Eckhardt de Mesquita	1	0.45	
Daniel Coutinho	1	0.45	
J.W.Q. van Dijek	1	0.45	
A. da Silva Pereira	1	0.45	
Asser Samuels	1	0.45	
H.S. Schouten	1	0.45	
A.W.S. Schut	1	0.45	
H. Weytingh	1	0.45	
E.A. van Romondt	1	0.45	
H. van Breen	1	0.45	
J.C. Weidner	1	0.45	
A.E. Green	1	0.45	
J. de la Parra	1	0.45	
J.D. Horst	1	0.45	
P.A. Bruggemann	1	0.45	
Total	653	100.00	
Source: Koloniaal Nieuws

== Aftermath ==
Governor-General Hendrik Jan Smidt reappointed David Juda and Wouterus van Esveld as nominated members, together with Isaac da Costa and Salomon Matthijs Swijt.

The newly elected States met for the first time in May, with Juda remaining chairman.
