= 1930 Surinamese general election =

Partial general elections were due to be held in Suriname in March 1930 to elect four of the thirteen members of the Colonial States. However, only four candidates were nominated and were declared elected unopposed in February.

== Electoral system ==
The elections were held using the two-round system, with suffrage restricted to men who paid a tax contribution of 60 Dutch guilders. Voters had multiple votes, and any candidate receiving a number of votes equivalent to over 50% of the valid ballots cast was elected in the first round. If not all seats were filled, a second round was held.

Candidates were elected for a six-year term with staggered elections every two years and the 1930 elections were to replace the four members elected in the 1924 elections. Only one of those – Jacques Drielsma – was still in office. Pieter Walther Hering had died in 1925 and been replaced by Samuel Juda Samuels. Thomas Waller had resigned in 1927 and been replaced by Carel Laurens Cool, while Karel Johannes van Erpecum had resigned in 1929 and been replaced by Cornelis William Naar.

== Results ==
There were only four candidates; Naar and Samuels ran for re-election, while Johannes Brons and Clemens Ramkisoen Biswamitre also stood. All four were elected unopposed, with Biswamitre becoming the first Indo-Surinamese member of the States.
