= 1908 Surinamese general election =

Partial general elections were held in Suriname in March 1908 to elect four of the thirteen members of the Colonial States.

== Electoral system ==
The elections were held using the two-round system, with suffrage restricted to men who paid a tax contribution of 60 Dutch guilders. Voters had multiple votes, and any candidate receiving a number of votes equivalent to over 50% of the valid ballots cast was elected in the first round. If not all seats were filled, a second round was held.

Candidates were elected for a six-year term with staggered elections every two years and the 1908 elections were for the four members elected in the 1902 elections. However, of the four with six-year terms, only one had remained a member since 1902: Theophilius Libertador Ellis. Adrianus van 't Hoogerhuys had resigned in 1905 and been replaced by Jacobus Carolius Juda. However, when Juda resigned in 1907, van 't Hoogerhuys was elected unopposed as his replacement. Of the other two elected in 1902, Frederik Willem Morren had been replaced by Roelof Fabriek in 1905 and Alexander Ferrier Wilmans by August Richard Bueno in 1906. All four incumbents ran for re-election.

== Results ==
With 339 valid votes cast, candidates required 170 votes to be elected in the first round. All four incumbents were easily re-elected with over 80% of the vote.

Candidate	Votes	%	Notes
Adrianus van 't Hoogerhuys	307	90.56	Re-elected
Roelof Fabriek	288	84.96	Re-elected
August Richard Bueno	283	83.48	Re-elected
Theophilius Libertador Ellis	280	82.60	Re-elected
J.C.P. Ulrich	77	22.71	
Total	1,235	100.00	
Valid votes	339	97.13	
Invalid/blank votes	10	2.87	
Total votes	349	100.00	
Registered voters/turnout	748	46.66	
Source: De Surinamer

== Aftermath ==
Raimond Nazaire Guillaume Marie Bär von Hemmersweil (elected in a by-election earlier in 1908) resigned in late 1908. Franciscus Smith was elected as his replacement.

February 1909 by-election
Candidate	Votes	%
Franciscus Smith	232	81.12
C.C.M. Ligtenberg	54	18.88
Total	286	100.00
Valid votes	286	96.30
Invalid votes	10	3.37
Blank votes	1	0.34
Total votes	297	100.00
Source: Suriname

't Hoogerhuys resigned in 1909 and was replaced by Harry van Ommeren.

17–21 June 1909 by-election
Candidate	Votes	%
Harry van Ommeren	187	57.89
P. Carst	136	42.11
Total	323	100.00
Valid votes	323	94.17
Invalid votes	11	3.21
Blank votes	9	2.62
Total votes	343	100.00
Source: De West

Frans Carel Gefken (elected in 1906) died in June 1909 and was replaced by Lucas Lubbertus Beckeringh van Loenen.

September–October 1909 by-election
Candidate	First round		Second round	
Candidate	Votes	%	Votes	%
Lucas Lubbertus Beckeringh van Loenen	110	40.00	152	50.67
H. Gonggrijp	79	28.73	148	49.33
Pieter Walther Hering	73	26.55		
Wilhelmus Nicolaas Stephanus Arntz	13	4.73		
Total	275	100.00	300	100.00
Valid votes	275	93.86	300	98.04
Invalid/blank votes	18	6.14	6	1.96
Total votes	293	100.00	306	100.00
Registered voters/turnout	728	40.25		
Source: Nieuwe Surinaamsche courant, De West
