= Daniel Coutinho =

Member of the Colonial States
- In office 1898–1910

Personal details
- Born: 18 October 1860 Paramaribo, Suriname
- Died: 7 January 1932 (aged 71) Voorburg, Netherlands

Daniel Coutinho (18 October 1860 – 7 January 1932) was a Surinamese lawyer and politician. He served as a member of the Colonial States from 1898 to 1910.

== Biography ==
Born in Paramaribo in 1860, Coutinho began practicing law after passing exams in 1883. He also became a subdistrict court judge in Paramaribo.

Coutinho contested the 1888 general elections, but received only one vote. In the 1892 general elections he received three votes. He ran again in 1894, receiving 60 votes and finishing sixth (with three seats available). At the same time, he also contested a by-election for a single vacant seat, finishing third. In the 1896 elections he received only six votes. However, in the 1898 elections he received 157 votes in the first round, and defeated J.O. Harken in a runoff for the third seat by 210 votes to 83, gaining election to the Colonial States for the first time. Although he had been elected for a six-year term, all seats were vacated and put up for election in 1902. Coutinho received 431 votes, with 87% of the electorate voting for him; However, he was up for re-election again in 1904 and was easily re-elected for a six-year term. Although he was re-elected again in 1910, he resigned shortly afterwards for health reasons and was replaced by Adolf Curiel.

Coutinho subsequently moved to the Netherlands. He died in Voorburg in 1932.
