= Johannes van Heerdt tot Eversberg =

Dutch naval officer and civil servant (1829-1893)

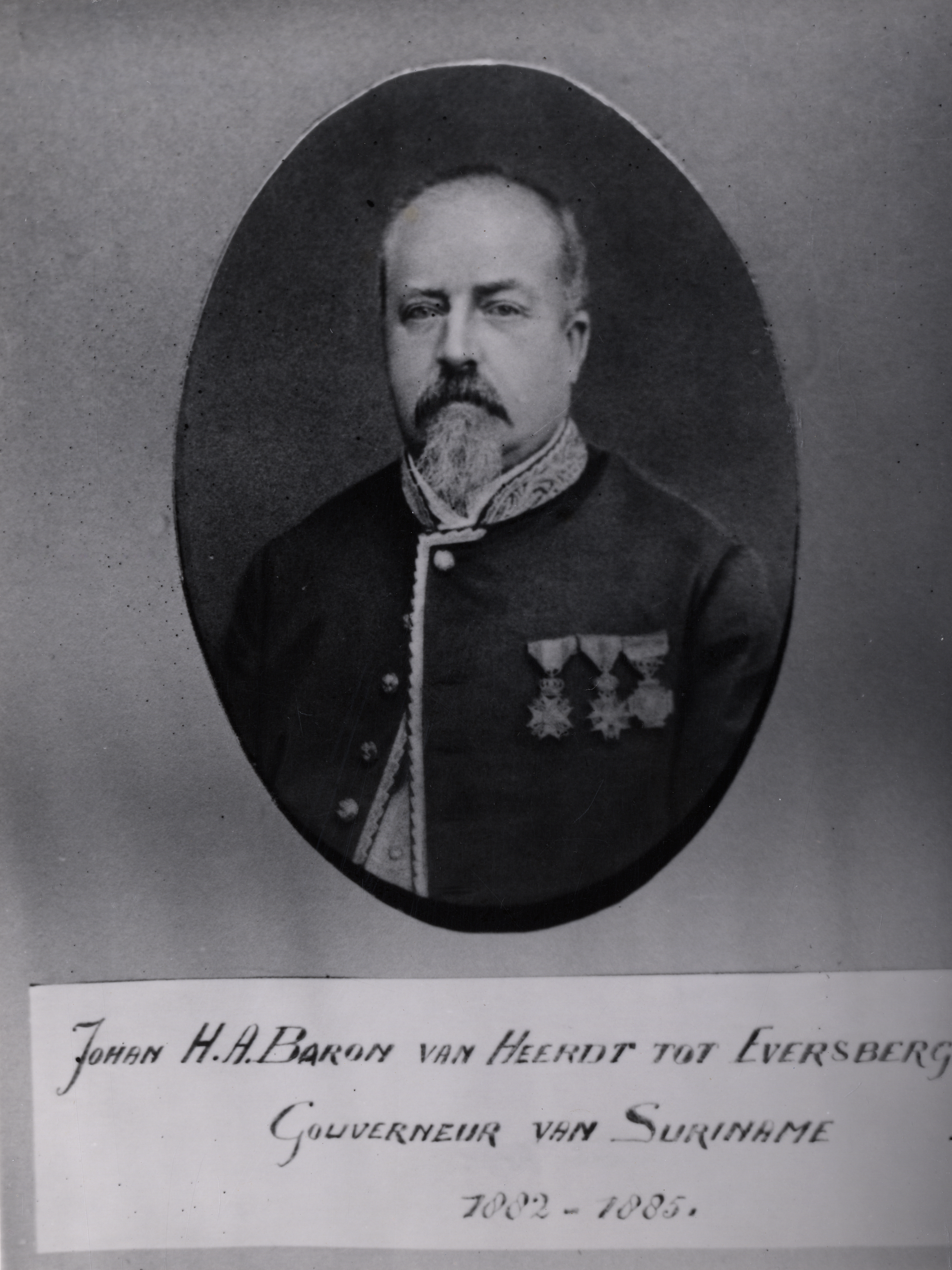
- van Heerdt tot Eversberg (c. 1885)

Governor of Suriname
- In office 11 November 1882 – 1 August 1885
- Preceded by: Cornelis van Sypesteyn
- Succeeded by: Hendrik Jan Smidt

Governor of Curaçao and Dependencies
- In office 1 October 1880 – 18 October 1882
- Preceded by: Hendrik Bernardus Kip
- Succeeded by: Nicolaas van den Brandhof

Personal details
- Born: Johannes Herbert August Willem van Heerdt tot Eversberg; 22 February 1829 Zwolle, Netherlands
- Died: 10 January 1893 (aged 63) The Hague, Netherlands
- Occupation: naval officer, civil servant and colonial administrator

Johannes Herbert August Willem, Baron van Heerdt tot Eversberg (22 February 1829 – 10 January 1893) was a Dutch naval officer, civil servant, and colonial administrator. He served as Governor of Curaçao and Dependencies from 1 October 1880 until 18 October 1882, and Governor of Suriname from 11 November 1882 until 1 August 1885.

== Biography ==
Van Heerdt tot Eversberg was born on 22 February 1829 in Zwolle, Netherlands. He joined the Royal Netherlands Navy, and left the navy in 1861 as lieutenant. The same year, he was part of the Dutch–French border commission tasked with mapping the Marowijne River which forms to boundary between Suriname and French Guiana. On 10 April 1862, a map and a report was produced by the commission, and the border was considered solved. In 1885, gold was discovered near the Marowijne River, and the border was in dispute. As of 2021, the dispute has not been resolved.

In 1863, van Heerdt tot Eversberg was appointed District Commissioner of Upper Suriname (nowadays approximates Paramaribo District), and served until 1968. In 1868, he became custodian of the first mortgage office in Suriname, however he returned the same year to the Netherlands for health reasons, and in 1869 started to work for the Ministry of the Colonies.

On 31 May 1880, van Heerdt tot Eversberg was appointed Governor of Curaçao and Dependencies, and was installed on 1 October 1880. Cornelis van Sypesteyn, the governor of Suriname, was accused of personally profiting from gold concessions and, subsequently, turned in his resignation. On 5 September 1882, it was announced that van Heerdt tot Eversberg would be transferred from Curaçao to Suriname. Van Heerdt tot Eversberg left Curaçao on 18 October 1882.

On 11 November 1882, van Heerdt tot Eversberg was installed as Governor of Suriname and served until 1 August 1885.

Van Heerdt tot Eversberg died on 10 January 1893 in The Hague, at the age of 63.

== Honours ==
- Knight of the Order of the Netherlands Lion.
