= 1902 Surinamese general election =

General elections were held in Suriname in April 1902 to elect all thirteen members of the Colonial States.

== Electoral system ==
The elections were held using the two-round system, with suffrage restricted to men who paid a tax contribution of 60 Dutch guilders. Voters had multiple votes, and any candidate receiving a number of votes equivalent to over 50% of the valid ballots cast was elected in the first round. If not all seats were filled, a second round was held.

== Results ==
With 497 valid votes cast, candidates required 249 votes to be elected in the first round. Two seats remained unfilled, resulting in the top four remaining candidates contesting a second round.

Candidate	First round		Second round		Notes
Candidate	Votes	%	Votes	%	Notes
Frits Curiel	440	88.53			Re-elected
Adrianus van 't Hoogerhuys	433	87.12			Re-elected
Daniel Coutinho	431	86.72			Re-elected
Isaac da Costa	405	81.49			Re-elected
Theophilius Libertador Ellis	405	81.49			Re-elected
Cornelis Johannes Heylidy	402	80.89			Re-elected
Julius Muller	378	76.06			Re-elected
Frans Carel Gefken	348	70.02			Re-elected
Marcus Samson van Praag	277	55.73			Re-elected
Alexander Ferrier Wilmans	263	52.92			Elected
Jacobus Arnoldus Dragten	252	50.70			Elected
Frederik Willem Morren	245	49.30	278	50.73	Elected
François Wijnand Hensen	232	46.68	119	21.72	Unseated
Reinbertus Aloisius Tammenga	230	46.28	293	53.47	Re-elected
Karel Hendrik Bergen	205	41.25	231	42.15	
Jacques Bernard Nassy	172	34.61			
Jacobus Carolius Juda	152	30.58			
Samuel Bueno Bibaz	114	22.94			
W.J. van Voss	105	21.13			
Richard O'Ferrall	87	17.51			
Abraham Salomons	74	14.89			Unseated
Th.J.F. Valoise Smith	37	7.44			
A.A. Ter Iaag	21	4.23			
Eduard Adriaan Cabell	20	4.02			
P.M. Nahar	18	3.62			
C.J. Hering	13	2.62			
H. Hubrer	13	2.62			
Charles Ferdinand Schoch	12	2.41			
Samuel Muller van Voorst	12	2.41			Unseated
John Robert Thomson	11	2.21			
J.E. Aberbanel	10	2.01			
Justus Gonggrijp	9	1.81			
J.A. Polak	7	1.41			
J.J. Halfhide	7	1.41			
K.A. Beek	7	1.41			
A.J. Baron Schimmelpenninck van der Oye	7	1.41			
D. Hartogh	6	1.21			
J.A. da Costa	6	1.21			
Th.F.J. Valois Smith	6	1.21			
J.F. Nassy	6	1.21			
S.H. Gonggrijp	5	1.01			
C. Juda	4	0.80			
J. Hettasch	4	0.80			
A. Bruyning	4	0.80			
R.C. Buth	3	0.60			
J.R. Heijmans	3	0.60			
G.F.C. Hering	3	0.60			
H. Simons	3	0.60			
G.J. Vauier	3	0.60			
W.L. Loth	3	0.60			
J.B.L. Nassy	3	0.60			
P.A. Bruggemann	2	0.40			
D. Juda	2	0.40			
A.H. Zschuschen	2	0.40			
P. ter Laag	2	0.40			
A. Scharf	2	0.40			
G.H. Geeiling	2	0.40			
A.J. da Costa	2	0.40			
G.A. van Emden	2	0.40			
Wong-Lun-Hing	2	0.40			
H. Salm	2	0.40			
A.M.F. del Prado	1	0.20			
P. Carst	1	0.20			
M.O. Salomons	1	0.20			
Van den Corput	1	0.20			
H.F. Rickei	1	0.20			
J.F.H. Voet	1	0.20			
H.D. Benjamins	1	0.20			
A.G. van Wieringen	1	0.20			
Van West	1	0.20			
A.T. Oliveira	1	0.20			
B. Heyde	1	0.20			
W. L. Ten Harmse van der Seek	1	0.20			
H. van Breen	1	0.20			
D. Hoekstra	1	0.20			
C.A.J. Struiken	1	0.20			
A. Conraji	1	0.20			
W. van Oosterzee	1	0.20			
J.B.P. Rens	1	0.20			
W.H.V. Graaf van Heerdttot Eversberg	1	0.20			
A. Bray	1	0.20			
Coupijn Rijsdijk	1	0.20			
J.A ]. van Beek	1	0.20			
D. de la Parra	1	0.20			
A. da Silva Pereira	1	0.20			
Continho	1	0.20			
J.F.R. Folmai	1	0.20			
J.B.L. Seiler	1	0.20			
A.E.J.W. Juta	1	0.20			
John Ben	1	0.20			
J Hoepel	1	0.20			
Ch. Deyl	1	0.20			
A.F.C. Curiel	1	0.20			
Ongua-Swei	1	0.20			
C.S. Gorsira	1	0.20			
M.J. Biomet	1	0.20			
Pater Walle	1	0.20			
S.H. Pos	1	0.20			
J. van Praag	1	0.20			
P. van den Broek	1	0.20			
M.P. Heilbron	1	0.20			
H. van Ravenswaay	1	0.20			
C.A. van Brussel	1	0.20			
S.H. Bibaz	1	0.20			
J.C.F. de la Parra	1	0.20			
G.A. Bergen	1	0.20			
C.C. Faerber	1	0.20			
C. Bender	1	0.20			
C.H. Waller	1	0.20			
J.F. Spiering	1	0.20			
C.E. Juda	1	0.20			
J.A. Morren	1	0.20			
Anton Dragten	1	0.20			
J.L. Heilbron	1	0.20			
P. de Bresas	1	0.20			
G.C. de Pina	1	0.20			
P Hofstede Crull	1	0.20			
R. Bueno de Mesquita	1	0.20			
R.G. Vervuurt	1	0.20			
J.H.L. Cosier	1	0.20			
G.J.R. Eysink	1	0.20			
H. van de Leuv	1	0.20			
E.W. Morren	1	0.20			
C. van Drimmelen	1	0.20			
W. von Hemert	1	0.20			
J.C. Weidner	1	0.20			
Total	6,001	100.00	921	100.00	
Valid votes	497	98.81	548	99.64	
Invalid votes	1	0.20	2	0.36	
Blank votes	5	0.99	0	0.00	
Total votes	503	100.00	550	100.00	
Source: Nieuwe Surinaamsche courant, Suriname

== Aftermath ==
Julius Muller died in November 1902. A by-election was held between 8 and 14 January 1903, The result was a tie between the two candidates, Karel Hendrik Bergen and Charles Ferdinand Schoch, who received 259 votes each, with ten invalid votes. This necessitated a re-run, which was held three weeks later; Bergen was elected with 286 votes, Schoch received 265, and two other candidates received one vote each.

January–February 1903 by-election
Candidate	First round		Second round	
Candidate	Votes	%	Votes	%
Karel Hendrik Bergen	259	50.00	286	51.72
Charles Ferdinand Schoch	259	50.00	265	47.92
J.L. Heijmans			1	0.18
A.W. Schoch			1	0.18
Total	518	100.00	553	100.00
Valid votes	518	98.11	553	97.88
Invalid/blank votes	10	1.89	12	2.12
Total votes	528	100.00	565	100.00
Source: Suriname, De Surinamer

Marcus Samson van Praag returned to the Netherlands in 1903. In the by-election to succeed him, Jacques Bernard Nassy was elected in the second round, defeating Samuel Bueno Bibaz.

September–October 1903 by-election
Candidate	First round		Second round	
Candidate	Votes	%	Votes	%
Jacques Bernard Nassy	117	32.05	214	60.62
Samuel Bueno Bibaz	100	27.40	139	39.38
François Wijnand Hensen	58	15.89		
Charles Ferdinand Schoch	33	9.04		
Roelof Fabriek	24	6.58		
C.R. Frowein Jr.	10	2.74		
Richard O'Ferrall	5	1.37		
C.R. Buth	4	1.10		
C.A.J. Struycken	3	0.82		
J.P. Monsanto	2	0.55		
Th. Valois Smith	2	0.55		
G. Bullab	1	0.27		
Gosira	1	0.27		
J.B.L. Nassy	1	0.27		
A. Reyen	1	0.27		
S. da Silva	1	0.27		
Schimmmelpenninck van de Oye	1	0.27		
A.W. Weytinigh	1	0.27		
Total	365	100.00	353	100.00
Valid votes	365	93.83	353	94.64
Invalid/blank votes	24	6.17	20	5.36
Total votes	389	100.00	373	100.00
Source: De Surinamer
