= Alfred Morpurgo =

Surinamese journalist and politician

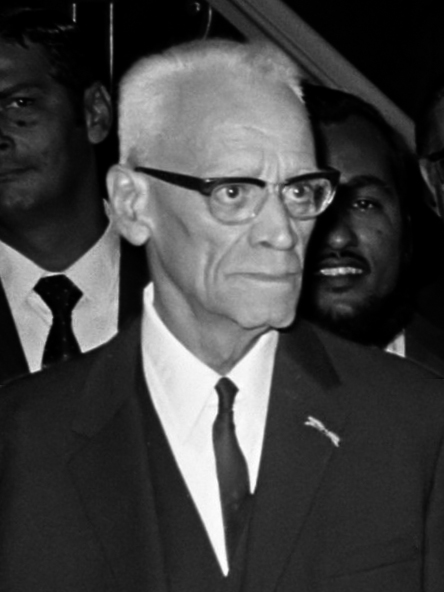
- Morpurgo in 1972

Deputy Prime Minister of Suriname
- In office 25 June 1958 – 30 June 1963
- Prime Minister: Severinus Desiré Emanuels
- Preceded by: Position established
- Succeeded by: Sewraam Rambaran Mishre

Personal details
- Born: Alfred Johan Morpurgo; 18 August 1899 Paramaribo, Suriname
- Died: 5 May 1973 (aged 73) Paramaribo, Suriname
- Party: Progressive Surinamese People's Party
- Occupation: Journalist, politician

Alfred Johan Morpurgo (18 August 1899 – 5 June 1973) was a Surinamese journalist and politician who served as the Deputy Prime Minister of Suriname from 25 June 1958 until 30 June 1963.

== Biography ==
Morpurgo was born on 18 August 1899 in Paramaribo. His father was editor of the newspaper Suriname. Morpurgo obtained a teaching certificate but soon after left education to go into journalism. He started working for the Catholic newspaper De Surinamer, which was founded in 1894. In 1921, Morpurgo became the co-editor. In 1942, he started his own printing company where his own newspaper Het Nieuws ("The News"), was printed from 1943 onwards and which would continue to exist until 1960.

From 1958 to 1963, Morpurgo was Deputy Prime Minister of Suriname and Minister of Education and Population Development in the Emanuels cabinet on behalf of the Catholic political party Progressive Surinamese People's Party (PSV).

In 1960, construction began on the dam in the Suriname River, which led to a lake that is now known as the Brokopondo Reservoir. Around that year, Morpurgo wrote a book entitled Brokopondo, een plan en een klank in Suriname ("Brokopondo, a plan and a sound in Suriname").

On 27 March 1972, Pierre Lardinois, Dutch Minister of Surinamese and Antillean affairs, installed a Kingdom Commission, chaired by Morpurgo from the Surinamese section. This Kingdom Commission was concerned with the political relations within the Kingdom of the Netherlands. Morpurgo died just over a year later at the age of 73.

His son Leo Morpurgo also went into journalism and was editor-in-chief of newspaper De Ware Tijd from 1961 to 1996.
