= Johannes Cateau van Rosevelt =

Dutch navy officer and civil servant

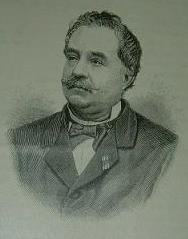

Member of the Colonial Estates of Suriname
- In office 1873–1891

Personal details
- Born: Johannes François Adriaan Cateau van Rosevelt; 7 September 1824; Hattem, Netherlands
- Died: 20 October 1891 (aged 67); Paramaribo, Surinam
- Occupation: military officer, politician, cartographer

Johannes François Adriaan Cateau van Rosevelt (7 September 1824 – 20 October 1891) was a Dutch navy officer and civil servant in Suriname where he was, among other things, agent-general for immigration and a member of the Colonial Estates of Suriname. He is known for his map of Suriname.

== Family ==
Cateau van Rosevelt born in Hattem as the son of François Abraham Cateau of Rosevelt (1786-1848), recipient of taxes, and Antonia van Wijhe (1790-1862) and a grandson of François Adriaan van Rosevelt Cateau. In 1870 he married the former slave Josephina Leentje Haver (1832-1906), with whom he had six premarital children and who had obtained a manumission from her owner A.M. Brandon in 1849.

== Career ==
In 1841, Cateau van Rosevelt first arrived in Suriname as ordinary seaman. On 9 January 1845, he returned as warrant officer. He worked as post commander in Commewijne and Nickerie, and studied mathematics and engineering. During that period, he started to create a map of Suriname. Even though he had been promoted officer, he left the navy in 1861.

Between 1868 and 1871, Cateau van Rosevelt was District Commissioner for Lower and Upper Saramacca. He was elected member of the Colonial States in 1873, and served until his death.

In 1872, Cateau van Rosevelt was appointed the first agent general for immigration. In that position, he oversaw the immigration of contract workers and mediated in labour disputes. He received the first Indo-Surinamese immigrants, who disembarked on 5 June 1873. In 1881, the first version of his map of Suriname was published. The map was bought by the Suriname government, expanded and corrected, and in 1912 became the official map of the colony.

In 1891, Cateau van Rosevelt intended to retire in the Netherlands, however the Governor van Asch van Wijck asked him to stay until his successor had been appointed and installed. Cateau van Rosevelt died on 20 October 1891 in Paramaribo, at the age of 67.

The Rosevelt peak in the interior of Suriname is named after him.

== Map ==
The map of Suriname of 1880.

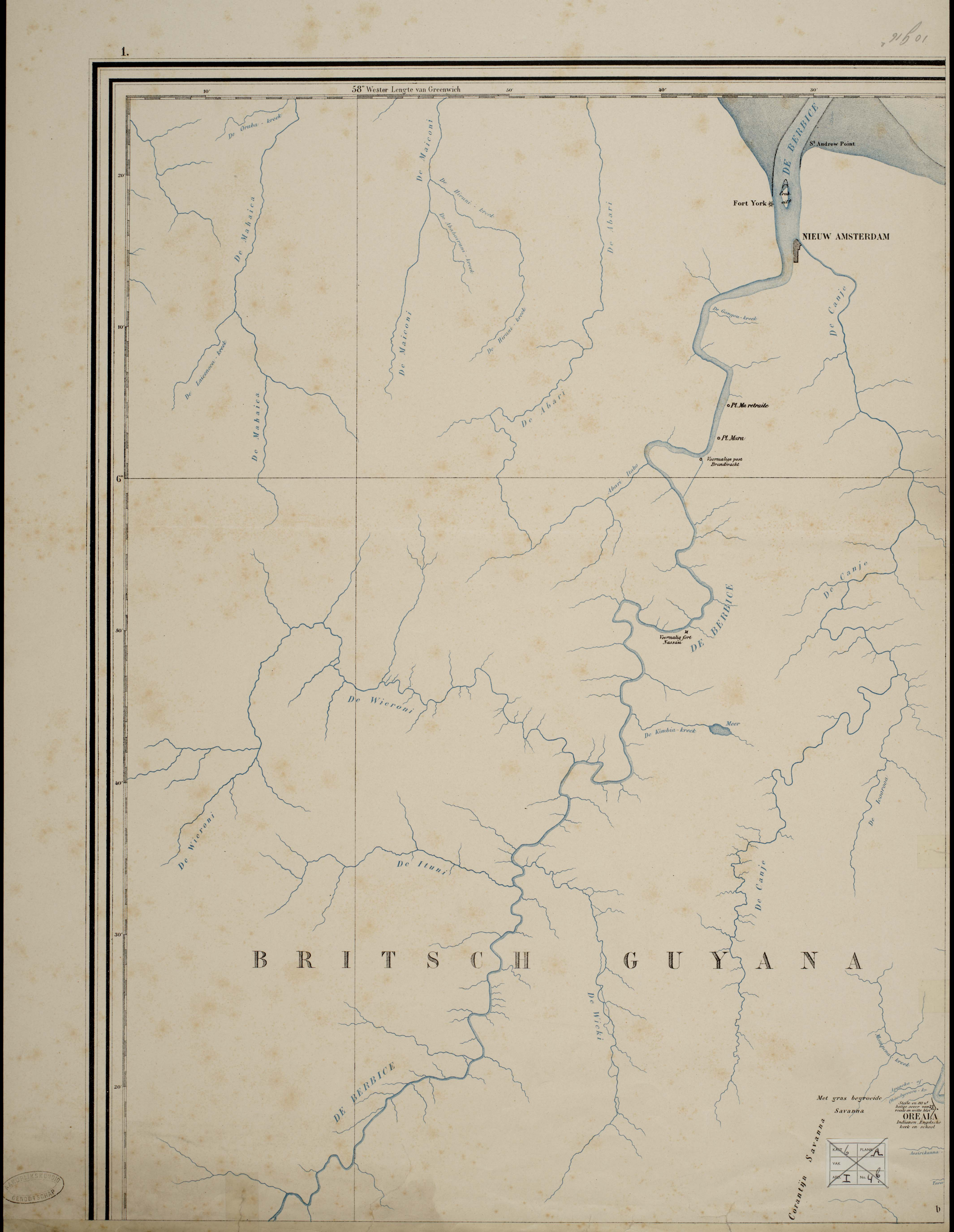
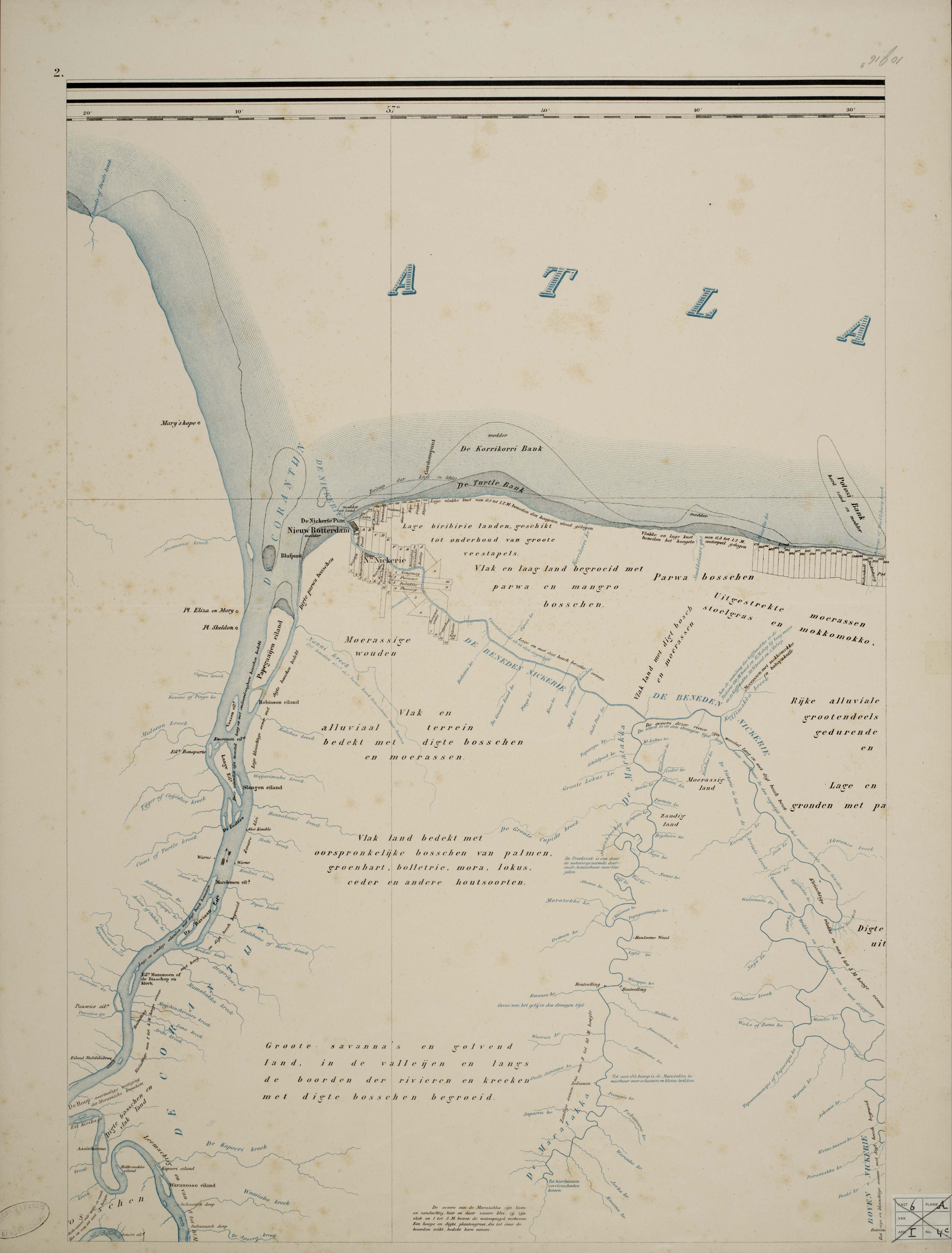
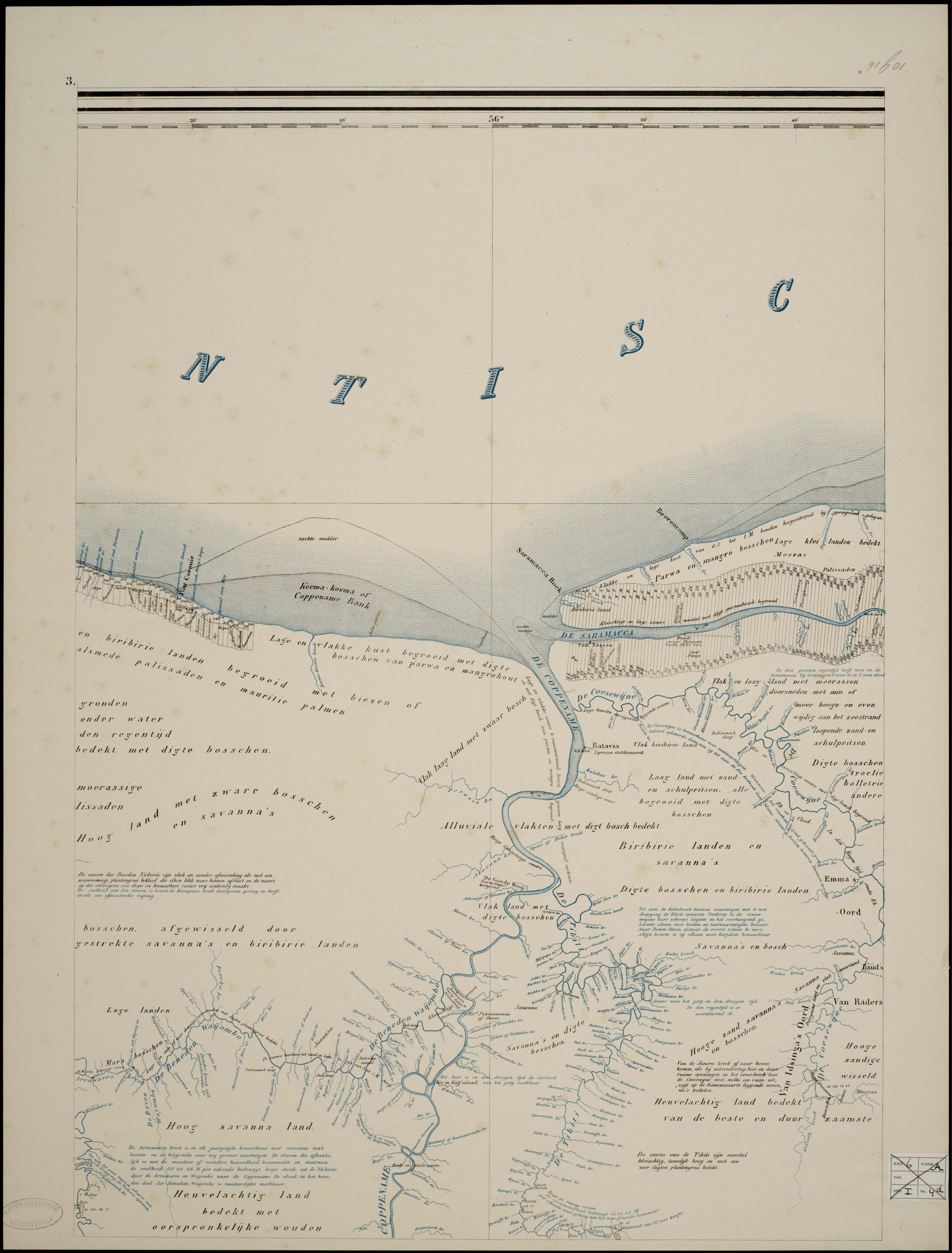
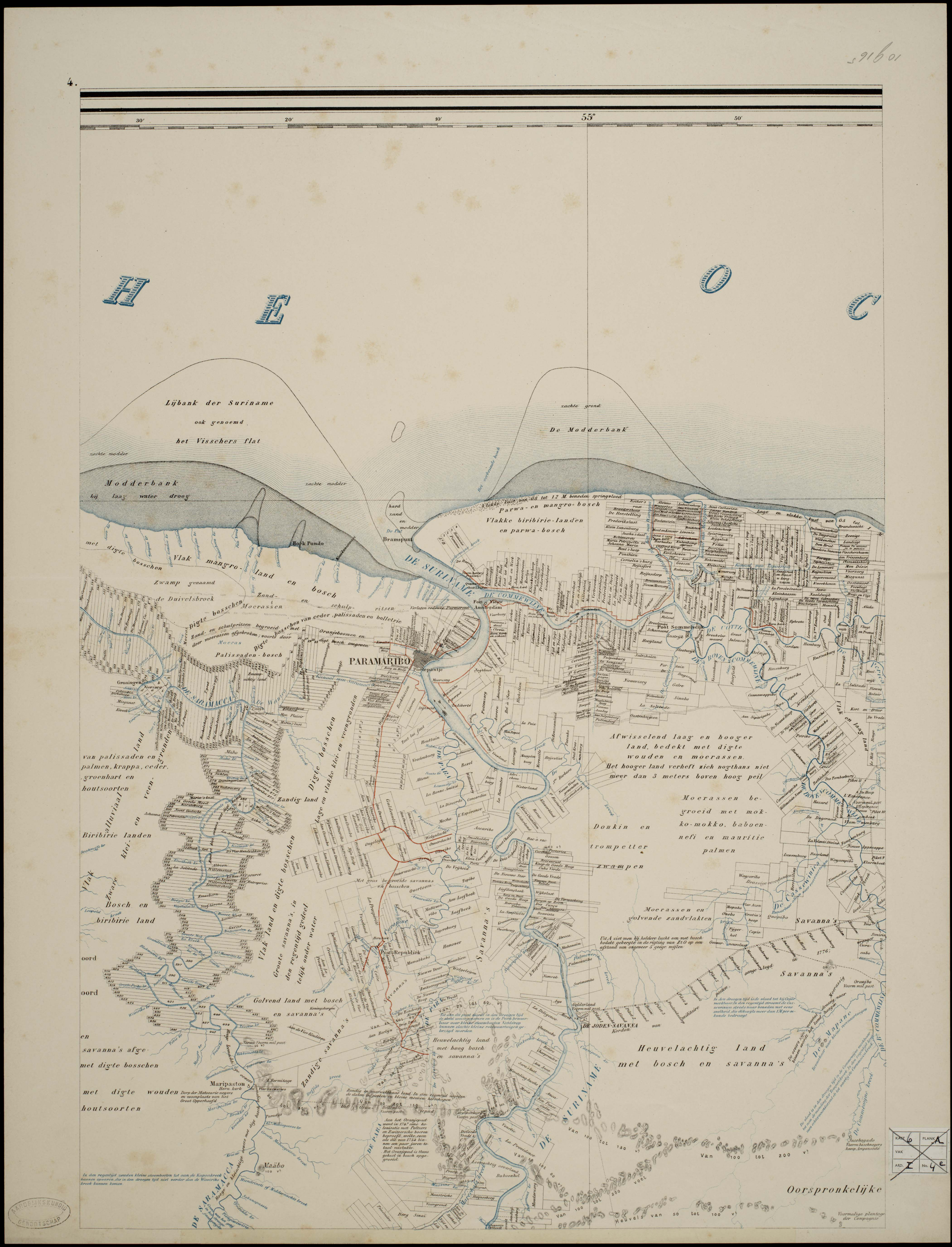
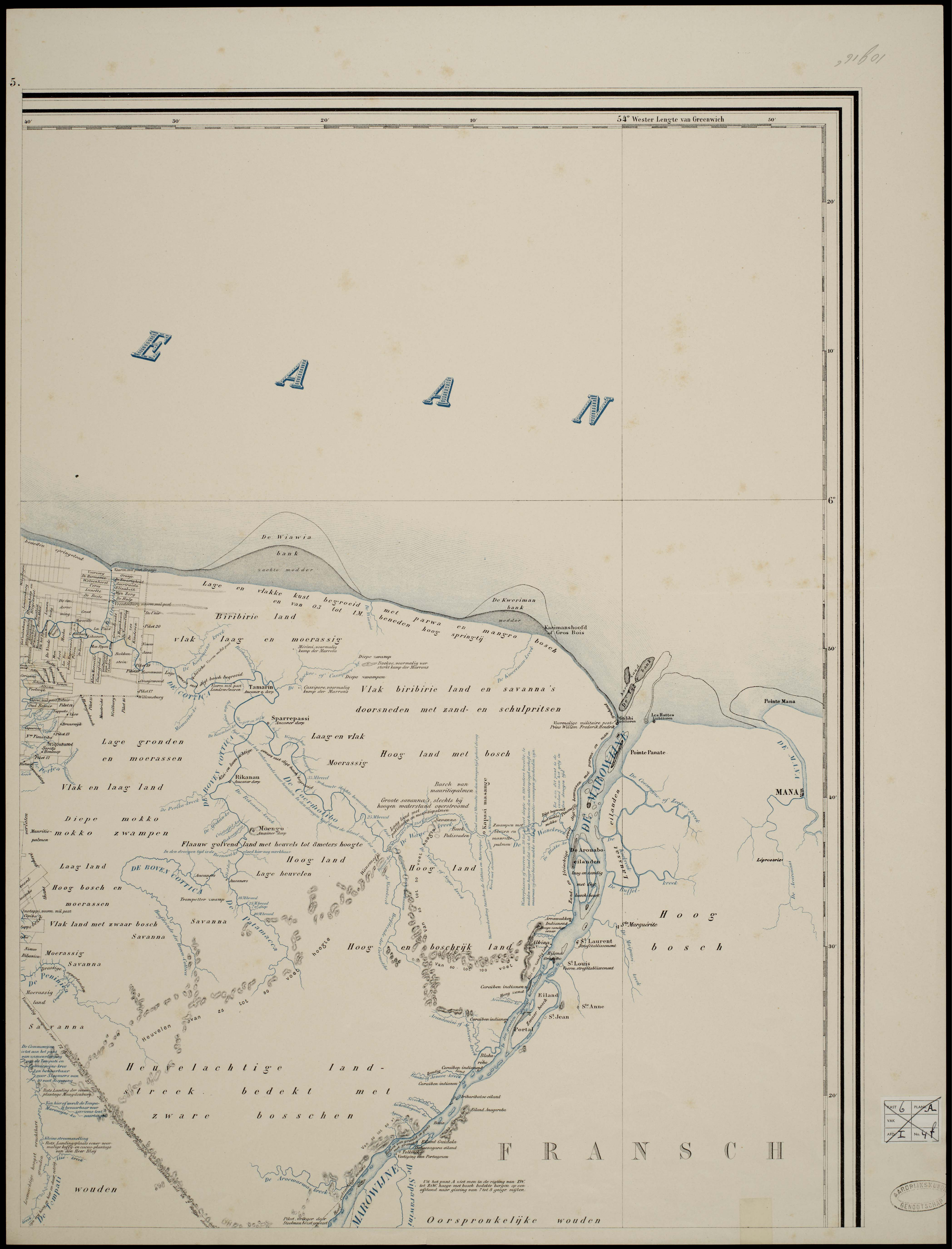
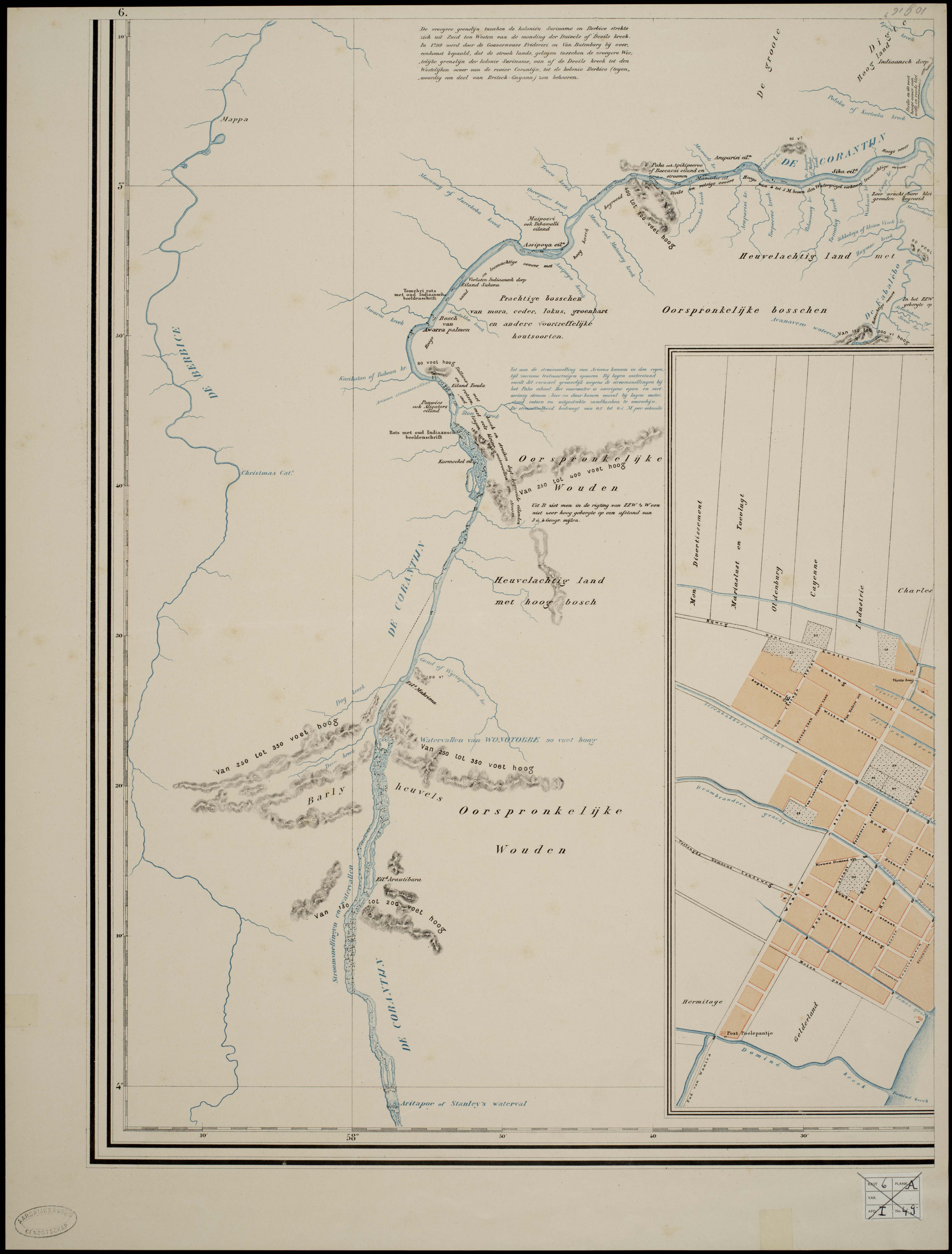
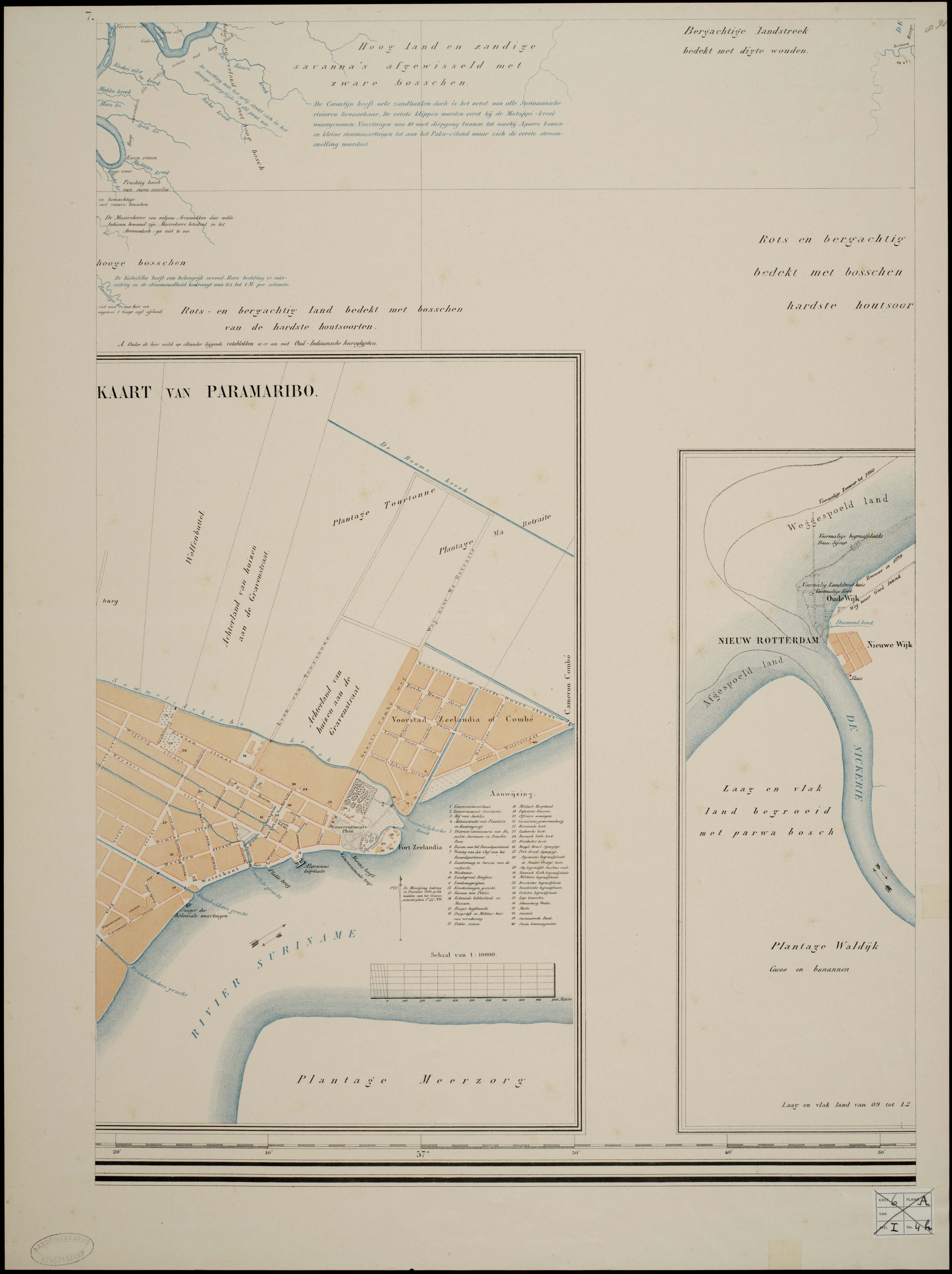
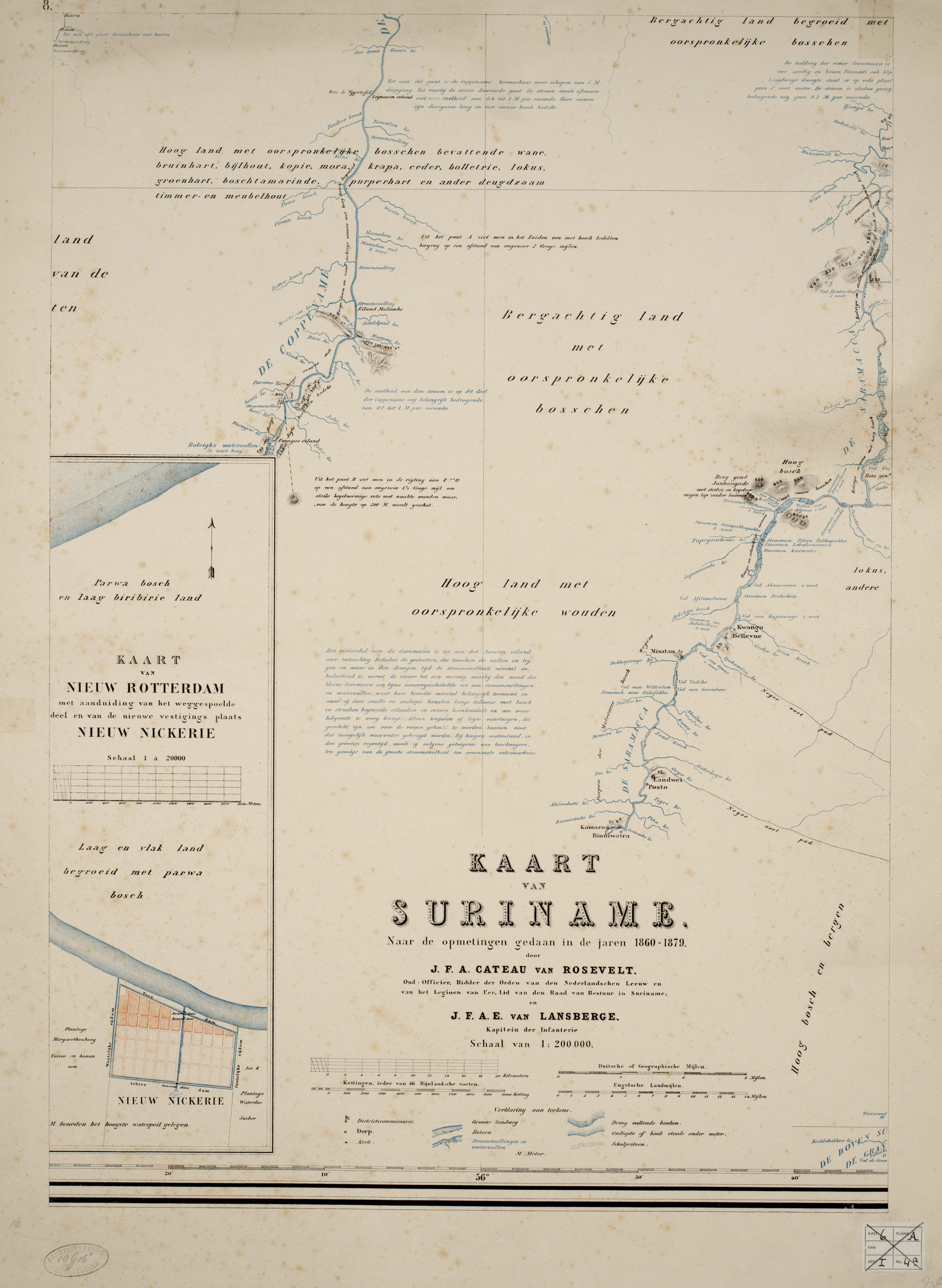
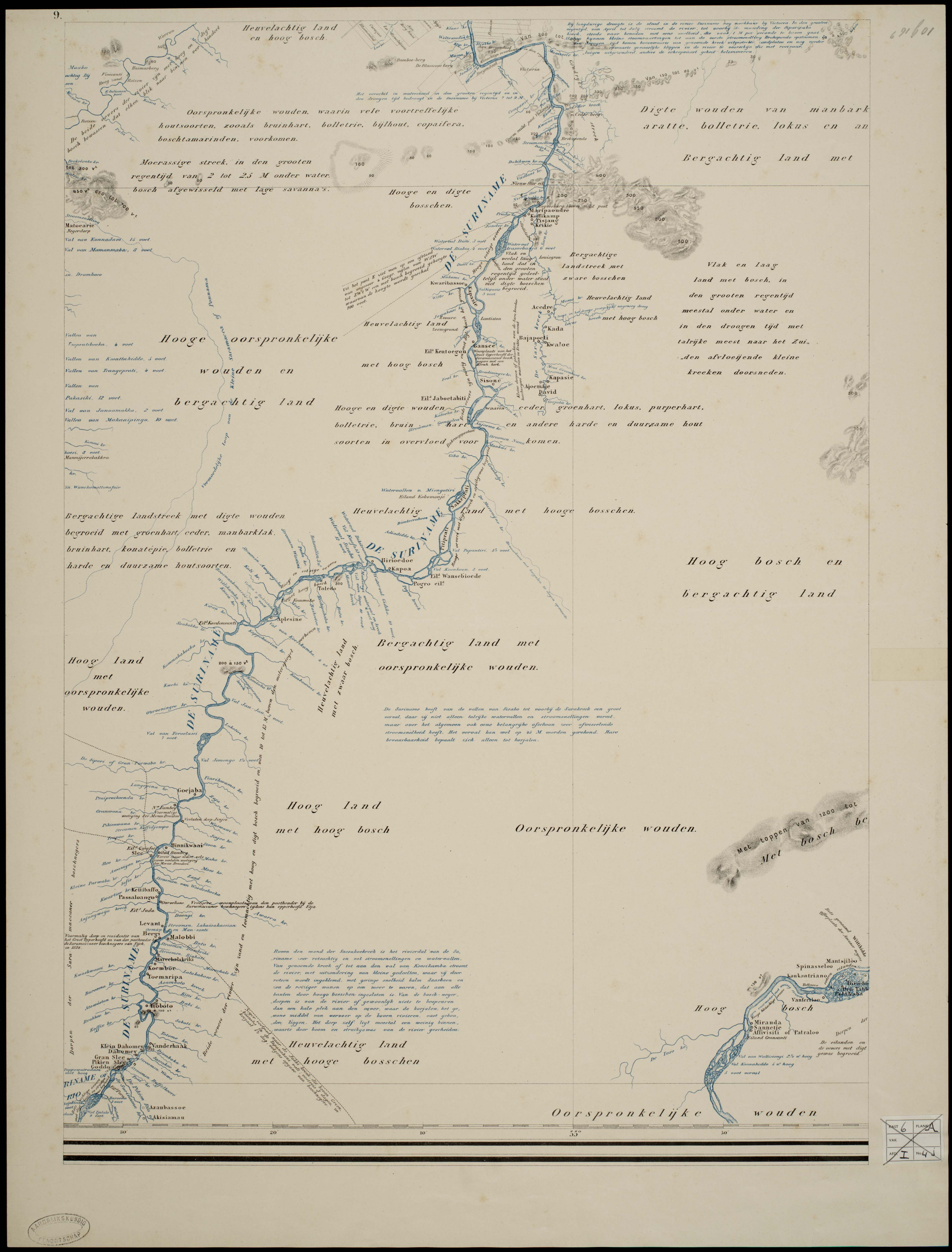
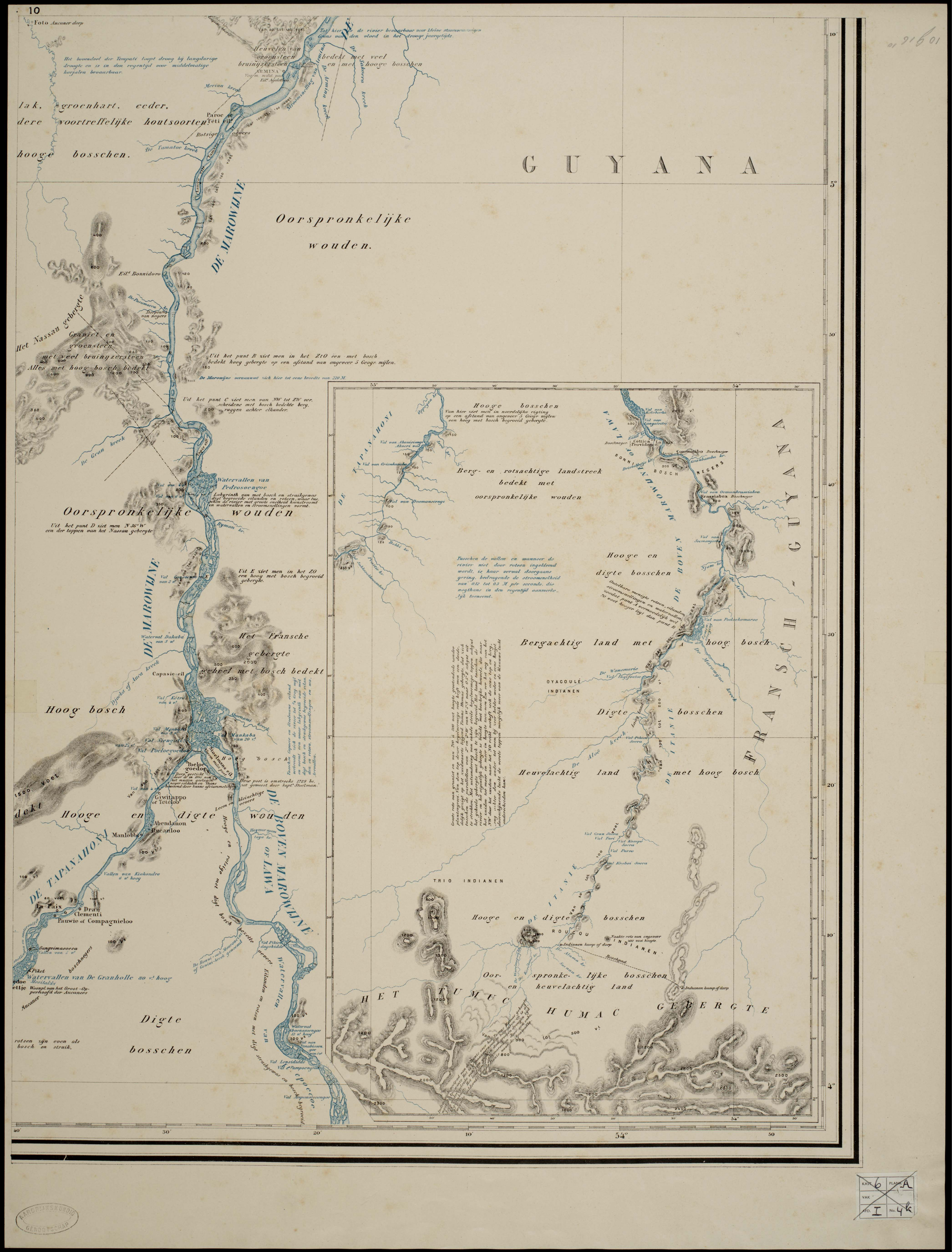

== Sources ==
- C.F.A. Bruijning en J. Voorhoeve (red.), Encyclopedie van Suriname, Amsterdam/Brussel 1977, ISBN 9010018423.
- L. Lapikás, Fragment Genealogie Cateau van Rosevelt, version 1.1, Muiden, 2012
