= Coenraad van Lier =

Surinamese physician, politician, and military officer

Colonial Estates of Suriname
- In office 1877–1891

Personal details
- Born: 6 January 1836 Paramaribo, Suriname
- Died: 20 January 1903 (aged 67) Amsterdam, Netherlands

Coenraad van Lier (6 January 1836 – 20 January 1903) was a Surinamese physician, politician, and military officer. He established the first medical school in Suriname.

== Biography ==
Van Lier was born on 6 January 1836 in Paramaribo. He joined the Royal Netherlands Army, and studied at the Rijks Kweekschool voor Militaire Geneeskundigen in Utrecht. In 1856, he graduated Officer of Health 3rd Class. In 1861, he graduated Doctor of Medicine at the University of Utrecht, and was promoted Officer of Health 2nd Class. In 1865, he was granted dismissal from the army, and became a medical doctor in Paramaribo.

In 1868, van Lier was appointed second city doctor. In 1877, he was elected to the Colonial Estates. Healthcare in Suriname was limited outside of the capital Paramaribo. In 1880, he forwarded a motion to establish a medical school which passed the Estates, however the States General of the Netherlands removed the plan from the budget. In 1881, a new motion was accepted. On 1 April 1882, the Geneeskundige School was founded, and van Lier served as one of the teachers of the school.

On 6 August 1891, van Lier retired from the Colonial Estates. He moved to Amsterdam where he worked as a physician.

Van Lier died on 20 January 1903, at the age of 67.
