= Householder Franchise =

Electoral system

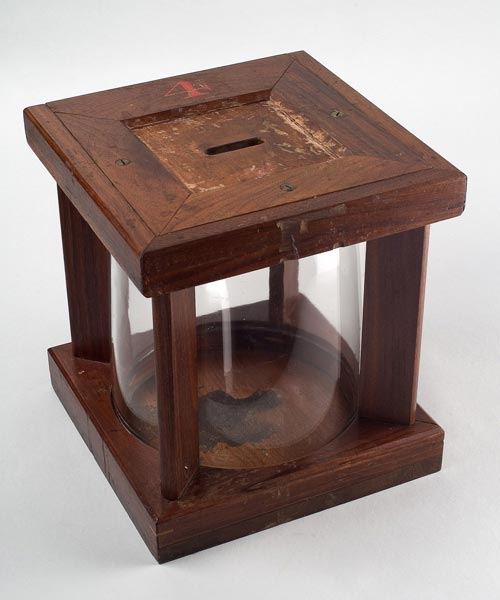
A glass globe ballot jar circa 1884.

Householder Franchise or census suffrage is where a homeowner has the right to vote in an election. This is a limited form of suffrage, but different from equal voting because, to borrow a dictum, householder franchise is one Household, one vote because it entitles only the householder one vote.

== History ==
The 1832 Reform Act expanded the number of voters in the United Kingdom. In the boroughs the right of voting was vested in all householders paying a yearly rental of £10 and, subject to one year residence qualification £10 lodgers (if they were sharing a house and the landlord was not in occupation).

In the counties, the franchise was granted to:

1. 40 shilling freeholders
2. £10 copyholders
3. £50 tenants
4. £10 long lease holders
5. £50 medium lease holders

Borough freeholders could vote in the counties if their freehold was between 40 shillings and £10, or if it was over £10 and occupied by a tenant.
