= List of official business registers =

This is a list of official business registers around the world.

There are many types of official business registers, usually maintained for various purposes by a state authority, such as a government agency, or a court of law. In some cases, it may also be devolved to self-governing bodies, either commercial (a chamber of commerce) or professional (a regulatory college); or to a dedicated, highly regulated company (i.e., operator of a stock exchange, a multilateral trading facility, a central securities depository or an alternative trading system).

The following is an incomplete list of official business registers by country.

== Types of registers ==
A business register may include data on entities, as well as on their status for various purposes. Examples of such registers include:

- company register — a register of legal entities in the jurisdiction they operate under, for the purpose of establishing, dissolving, acquisition of legal capacity and (in some cases) juridical personality, determination of legal representation, protection, accountability, and control of legal entities.
- list of undertakings cleared for access to classified information — register of companies authorized to work on contracts involving dealing with sensitive information documents of a government or an international organisation, usually maintained by a counter-intelligence service.
- statistical business register — plays a central part in a system of official economic statistics at a national statistics office.

Another group of business registers is focused on various assets or liabilities of an entity, rather than on entities themselves, these include:

- public contract register — a repository that aims at keeping track of all procurements, usually awarded through a tender, concluded by the public institutions, making this information available online, thereby providing a basis for monitoring the way in which public money is spent.
- public aid register — an official register of businesses in difficulties which received aid from the state.
- ultimate beneficial owner register — an official repository of natural person or persons who ultimately own or control a company, maintained to counteract money laundering and terrorist financing.
- land and mortgage register — concerns titles, rights, and liabilities (such as real estate liens or pledges) related to real estate, consisting of premises specified in a cadaster, such as land, buildings, or condominium units,
- cadaster — determines the geospatial localization, the extent, and (in some cases) the value of premises, including land parcels, buildings, and condominium units, which together form real estate, subject to rights and liabilities registered in a land and mortgage register,
- vehicle register (such as those for motor vehicles, rolling stock, boat or ships, or aircraft) — includes entries containing data on vehicle identification number, vehicle registration plate number, vehicle title, type approval, vehicle inspections, liability insurance, as well as vehicle liens, such as maritime liens, and which sometimes may be connected to a register of pledges or tax liens.
- register of pledges — includes entries concerning liabilities (pledges and voluntary specific liens) of a pledgor to a creditor, secured by tying them to a pledgor's collateral, such as a movable, a security, or an intellectual property right.
- industrial property register — an official database containing registered trade marks, as well as patented inventions, industrial designs, utility models, or integrated circuits, thus protecting and reserving the rights of the company which developed them or bought rights to them.
- plant breeders’ rights register — registers rights to a protected plant variety, developed and registered by a plant breeder.

Some types of business registers combine the features of both groups, these include:

- tax register — a register used for the purpose of revenue collection, including taxes, duties such as tariffs or excise, as well as mandatory social insurance and health insurance contributions; such a register includes all taxable entities, as well as their tax liabilities, including tax liens.
- public company and securities register — the official repository of publicly listed or unlisted companies whose at least one emission of securities was offered for the purpose of free trading to a number of persons exceeding certain threshold (varying according to jurisdiction), thus placing such a company under specific regulatory obligations, mainly concerning mandatory publication of information on the terms and rights attached to the offered security, as well as information on the company itself and its finances.
- list of companies and their securities publicly traded on a stock market — maintained by a stock exchange or an alternative trading system for the purpose of trading and quoting companies’ stocks.
- insolvency register — contains information on companies who entered insolvency, bankruptcy, liquidation, administration, receivership, debt restructuring, or have been under futile execution, either of an administrative debt (by a government agency) or of a private debt (by a bailiff), for longer than an amount of time specified by law, as well as on their liabilities.
- register or a list of a specified type of regulated entities or activities — contains entries on companies officially authorized to perform a specified type of business, where prior obtaining of a permit, a license, a concession, or registration on such a list or register is a prerequisite required by law. Depending on situation, regulation may apply to an entity type, or to a type of entity's activity.

== European Union and the European Economic Area ==
- company registers
  - European Commission - the Business Registers Interconnection System (BRIS) (uses data from national registers operated by the member states) (searchable); List of European Research Infrastructure Consortia (online web list)
  - European Committee of the Regions - Register of European Groupings of Territorial Cooperation (uses data from national lists operated by the member states) (available unrestricted as a search engine and a GIS/cadaster)
  - the Authority for European Political Parties and European Political Foundations - Register of European political parties and European political foundations (EU only) (online web lists)
- tax registers (European Commission)
  - VAT Information Exchange System (uses data from national registers operated by the member states) - taxpayers who obtained registration allowing to perform intra-community supply transactions; not mandatory for VAT-exempt entities involved in intra-community supply transactions of low worth in the given year, unless they do not perform services by delegating their employees to another EU country (online VAT number check)
  - System of Exchange of Excise Data (SEED) (uses data from national lists operated by the member states) - (in English) (SEED number check)
  - Registered Exporter System (REX) (central register with input operated by the member states) (in English) (REX number check)
  - Economic Operator Identification and Registration System (EORI) (central register with input operated by the member states) – (in English) (EORI number check)
  - Economic Operator Systems Authorized Economic Operator (central register with input operated by the member states) – Authorized Economic Operator Database (in English) (searchable)
- vehicle registers
  - EU Fleet Register (EU only, uses data from national lists operated by the member states) - registry of maritime commercial vessels used in fisheries within the Common Fisheries Policy (in English) (searchable)
  - EUCARIS (European Car and Driving License Information System)

=== Austria ===
- Wiener Zeitung — the official gazette. (languages: German only)
- Firmenbuch — the searchable database. (languages: German only)
- Financial Market Authority (FMA) — has searchable database for companies that hold FMA-issued licenses. (languages: German only)

=== Belgium ===
- KBO Public Search — searchable database for public information on every registered active enterprise and establishment in Belgium. (languages: Dutch, French)
- Central Balance Sheet Office (National Bank of Belgium) — has the accounts of companies, associations, and foundations active in Belgium. (languages: Dutch, French, German, English)
- Crossroads Bank for Enterprises
- Enterprise Search — maintained by the Federal Public Service Justice (languages: French only)
- Public companies register (STORI) — maintained by the Financial Services and Markets Authority

=== Bulgaria ===
- Trade Register — electronic register. Companies must be entered into the commercial register that is kept with the relevant district court, where they can be viewed by the public. (languages: Bulgarian only)
- D&B Report Guide Bulgaria — information on the different types of companies
- Trade Register (Bulgarian Chamber of Commerce and Industry)

=== Croatia ===
- Biznet — provides information and statistics on the Croatian economy, and access to the Register of Business Entities. It is maintained by the Croatian Chamber of Commerce Biznet. (languages: Croatian and English)
- D&B Report Guide Croatia — provides information on legal forms and filing requirements.
- Croatian Company Directory
- Business Register — maintained by the Ministry of Justice. (languages: Croatian only)
- Export Directory — maintained by the Chamber of Economy. (languages: Croatian only)

=== Cyprus ===
- Department of the Registrar of Companies and Official Receiver — responsible for keeping the Register of Companies, Partnerships, Business Names, Trade Marks, Patents and Industrial Designs, as well as for administering properties of insolvent legal and natural persons.

=== Czech Republic ===
- Public register and the collection of documents — maintained by the Ministry of Justice. (language: Czech)
- Register of economic entities — maintained by the Ministry of Finance
- Trade Licensing Register — maintained by the Ministry of Industry and Trade. (Czech version has additional detail.)

=== Denmark ===
- Central Business Register — the official registry of Danish businesses.
- Danish Commerce and Companies Agency (da:Erhvervs- og Selskabsstyrelsen) — former administrator of the Central Business Register, since a reorganization in 2012 a part of the Danish Business Authority (da:Erhvervsstyrelsen).
- Financial Supervisory Authority — supervisory agency which administers a database of enterprises under increased supervision.

=== Estonia ===
- Central Commercial Register (Estonian: Äriregistri teabesüsteem) — an online service based on the central database of Estonian registration departments of the courts.
- Database of the Financial Supervision Authority (Finantsinspektsioon) — searchable database of supervised entities. (languages: Estonian, English)

=== Finland ===
- Finnish Trade Register — official company register for Finnish companies, maintained by the Finnish Patent and Registration Office. (languages: Finnish, English, Swedish)
- BIS Search — trade register of 470,000 Finnish companies via the Business Information System of the Finnish Patent and Registration Office.
- Åland: Åland Online — companies, organizations and associations

=== France ===
- Trade and Companies Register (French: Infogreffe) — official register of over 3,200,000 French companies, maintained by the Commercial Court. (languages: French)
- Sirene — statistical business register maintained by INSEE. (languages: French only)
- Bulletin of Obligatory Legal Announcements — maintained by Journal officiel de la République française. (languages: French only)
- Official Bulletin of Civil and Commercial Announcements (Bulletin officiel des annonces civiles et commerciales, BODACC) — publishes companies registered in the RCS (registre du commerce et des sociétés). (languages: French only)
- Paris: Paris Registry — maintained by the Clerk of the Commercial Court of Paris (Greffe du Tribunal de Commerce de Paris)

=== Germany ===
- German Commercial Register — judicial register of the federal states. (languages: German, English, Spanisch, French, Italian)
- Business Register System (German: Unternehmensregister) — centralized statistical business register. (languages: German, English, Spanish, French, Italian)
- Federal Financial Supervisory Authority — listed companies. (languages: German and English)

=== Greece ===
- General Commercial Registry (Greek: Γενικό Εμπορικό Μητρώο)}
- Official gazette – Company search (in Greek)
- Athens Chamber of Commerce & Industry (EBEA)

=== Hungary ===
- Court of Company Registration — provides company information and electronic company registration service. It is maintained by the Ministry of Justice. (languages: Hungarian)
- Cégtaláló — searchable database. (languages: Hungarian)
- Financial Services Register — maintained by the Hungarian National Bank, also provides supervision of listed companies on Budapest Stock Exchange

=== Iceland ===
- Company Directory (Directorate of Internal Revenue) — (languages: Icelandic)

=== Ireland ===
- Companies Registration Office
  - Company Search — company directory
  - Registry of Friendly Societies

=== Italy ===
- Italian Business Register — public register of company details, maintained by the Italian Business Register Office, found in local Chambers of Commerce in Italy. (languages: Italian, English)
- Infocamere — company register of the Italian Chambers of Commerce. Information can be obtained from Infocamere and via the European Business Register (EBR). (languages: Italian, mostly)
- Infoimprese — (languages: Italian)
- Commissione Nazionale per le Società e la Borsa listed companies

=== Latvia ===
- Registry of Enterprises of Latvia. Registry also publish free publicly accessible database of companies of Latvia.
- Lursoft — database of all enterprises, public organizations, and foreign company agencies registered within the territory of Latvia, including information of their managers, shareholders fixed capital, and annual accounts. The information is based on original documents of the State Register of Enterprises. (languages: Latvian, mostly)

=== Liechtenstein ===
- Commercial Register — maintained by the Office of Justice. (languages: German only)

=== Lithuania ===
- Register of Legal Entities

=== Azerbaijan ===
- The State Tax Service under the Ministry of Economy of Azerbaijan is the state body that registers companies in Azerbaijan. Foreign individuals and foreign companies have equal rights to register their companies, just like local individuals and local companies in Azerbaijan.

=== Luxembourg ===
- Luxembourg Business Registers (in English)
- Registre de Commerce et des Sociétés — the official register of companies and associations in Luxembourg. (languages: German, French)
- Business permits (in English)
- Official Gazette "Mémorial C"(Legilux) (in French)
- Supervised entities (Commission de Surveillance du Secteur Financier)

=== Malta ===
- Malta Business Registry — registry of companies

=== Netherlands ===
- Trade Register — company search, maintained by Kamer van Koophandel. In the Netherlands, registration in the trade register is compulsory for almost every company. (languages: Dutch, English)

=== Norway ===
- Brønnøysund Register Centre — government body under the Norwegian Ministry of Trade and Industry, and consists of several different national EDP registers. (languages: Norwegian, mostly)
- Registry of supervised entities (Financial Supervisory Authority)

=== Poland ===
==== Regular company registers ====
There are two registers of entities which are obligated or allowed to register as entrepreneurs:

- Ministry of Development (MR) – Central Registration and Information on Business (CEIDG) – company register for natural persons trading as sole traders or their civil law partnerships (searchable); such companies are prohibited from performing certain activities (e.g. operating a life insurance company), and proper agricultural activity (animal breeding, plant cultivation) of an individual farmer is also excluded from registration in CEIDG; the register does not assign its own registration number, using the NIP (see below) for this purpose instead
- Ministry of Justice (MS):
  - National Court Register (KRS) (in Polish) (searchable) — register of the majority of juridical persons types, a well as other collective (private) legal entities (there are, however, numerous exceptions, see List of official business registers#Registers of businesses excluded from registration as entrepreneurs); assigns a registration number (numer KRS), mandatory to be exposed on all outbound company documents and letters; some activities (e.g. operating a school) are not available to all entities registered in KRS, but only to those who are juridical persons; members of some professions are not allowed to practise in all of the company types (e.g. an advocate is prohibited from practising the profession in the form of a limited liability company); its constituent parts are:
    - Register of Entrepreneurs (Rejestr przedsiębiorców) — the company register for entities other than natural persons which hold an obligatory status of entrepreneurs: trade partnerships: either entities with legal capacity but lacking juridical personality (registered partnerships, limited partnerships, limited joint-stock partnerships, professional partnerships), or juridical persons (limited liability companies, joint-stock companies), as well as for other types of entrepreneurs who are juridical persons, as well as any of the juridical persons registered in the Register of Associations, Other Social and Professional Organizations, Foundations and Independent Public Healthcare Institutions (see below) if they intend to perform business activities (when allowed by their bylaws, excluding the stand-alone public healthcare institutions, as they are not allowed to register as an entrepreneur, as well as those of juridical persons or other legal entities who are registered in the KRS exclusively for the purpose of obtaining status of an officially recognized charity - public benefit organization, and would otherwise be excluded from the registration in the KRS - see below)
    - Register of Associations, Other Social and Professional Organizations, Foundations and Stand-alone Public Healthcare Institutions (Rejestr stowarzyszeń, innych organizacji społecznych i zawodowych, fundacji oraz samodzielnych publicznych zakładów opieki zdrowotnej) — the other part of the KRS, is responsible for the registration of various other types of juridical persons. If any of the registered entities intend to perform business activities (when allowed by its bylaws), it also has to obtain registration in the Register of Entrepreneurs; in addition, juridical persons or any other legal entities (including those otherwise excluded or exempt from the registration in the KRS – see below) also have to register, if they apply for the status of an officially recognized charity (public benefit organization); however, as an exception, registration solely for that purpose neither confers juridical personality to entities lacking one nor does it create an obligation or right to register as an entrepreneur;
  - Court and Commercial Gazette (Monitor Sądowy i Gospodarczy) – official gazette (in Polish) (searchable);
  - Financial document viewer (Przeglądarka dokumentów finansowych) (in Polish) - the official free viewer of financial documents that allows downloading financial documents of an entity entered in the Register of Entrepreneurs of the National Court Register, in particular financial statements, reports on activities, resolutions on the allocation of profit or coverage of losses. The KRS number of the entity is needed to search.

==== Registers of businesses excluded from registration as entrepreneurs ====
Registers of some of the types of businesses excluded from registration as entrepreneurs which are available online include the following (the list does not include registries of entities established through a centralized European Union-level procedure, namely the European Research Infrastructure Consortia, the European political parties and the European political foundations):

- Agency for Restructuring and Modernisation of Agriculture (ARMiR) – National Register of the Rural Women's Associations (in Polish) (searchable);Register of Producers, Agricultural Holdings and Applications for Payment Entitlements (in Polish) - (non-searchable; however, the bulk of data may be obtained from the Directory of Common Agricultural Policy Beneficiaries - see above);
- Polish Waters National Water Management Holding (PGW WP) – IT system for protection against extraordinary hazards (ISOK) – Informatics System for Water Management (SIGW) – water cadaster, which includes the centralized register of water corporations, levee unions (input operated at the local level by the starostas) and the unions of water companies or levee unions (input operated at the local level by the voivodes) (in Polish) (searchable)
- Central Office of Geodesy (Land Survey) and Cartography – 'Land and Buildings Records (EGiB) – land and buildings cadaster, which includes the centralized register of common land management corporations (input operated at the local level by the starostas) (in Polish) (searchable)
- Polish Hunting Association (PZŁ) – Registers of Hunting Clubs, available on websites of each of the 49 district boards of the Association, located in: Biała Podlaska (in Polish), Białystok (in Polish), Bielsko-Biała (in Polish), Bydgoszcz (in Polish), Chełm (in Polish), Ciechanów (in Polish), Częstochowa (in Polish), Elbląg (in Polish), Gdańsk (in Polish), Gorzów Wlkp. (in Polish), Jelenia Góra (in Polish), Kalisz (in Polish), Katowice (in Polish), Kielce (in Polish), Konin (in Polish), Koszalin (in Polish), Kraków (in Polish), Krosno (in Polish), Legnica (in Polish), Leszno (in Polish), Lublin (in Polish), Łomża (in Polish), Łódź (in Polish), Nowy Sącz (in Polish), Olsztyn (in Polish), Opole (in Polish), Ostrołęka (in Polish), Piła (in Polish), Piotrków Tryb. (in Polish), Płock (in Polish), Poznań (in Polish), Przemyśl (in Polish), Radom (in Polish), Rzeszów (in Polish), Siedlce (in Polish), Sieradz (in Polish), Skierniewice (in Polish), Słupsk (in Polish), Suwałki (in Polish), Szczecin (in Polish), Tarnobrzeg (in Polish), Tarnów (in Polish), Toruń (in Polish), Wałbrzych (in Polish), Warszawa (in Polish), Włocławek (in Polish), Wrocław (in Polish), Zamość (in Polish), Zielona Góra (in Polish)
- Polish Academy of Sciences (PAN) – Register of (PAN) Research Institutes (in Polish) (searchable)
- Ministry of Science and Higher Education (MNiSW) – Register of Higher Education Institutions – includes both public and private institutions (in Polish) (searchable)
- Ministry of National Education (MEN) – Register of Schools and Educational Institutions (in Polish) – includes also the jednostki systemu oświaty (schools or educational institutions other than higher education institutions) (searchable)
- Ministry of Interior and Administration – register of inter-municipal unions, inter-county unions, as well as cross-category unions of municipalities and counties (in Polish), (downloadable lists); Database of Territorial Self-Government Units (in Polish), (downloadable lists in various formats); Register of Churches and Other Confessional Communities (in Polish), (only the list of denominations downloadable; non-searchable is the detailed part of the register, covering ecclesiastical juridical persons or other legal entities);
- Ministry of Justice - List of judicial enforcement officers (bailiffs) (in Polish), (searchable), the list is also available as a search engine on the website of their regulatory college, the National Council of Judicial Officers (in Polish),
- General Directorate for Environmental Protection (GDOŚ) – Central Register of Forms of Environmental Protection – includes the register of national parks, available as a search engine (in Polish), or a GIS/cadaster (in Polish) (searchable),
- Bureau for Forest Management and Geodesy State Enterprise on behalf of the State Forests National Forest Holding - Forest Data Bank - the official forest inventory and the forestry cadaster, also includes data on all territorial units of the State Forests (in English) (searchable),
- District Court in Warsaw (Sąd Okręgowy w Warszawie) – Register of Political Parties (in Polish) (searchable); Register of Pension Funds (in Polish) (searchable only in person; however, the bulk of the data may be obtained from the combined search engine of the Polish Financial Supervision Authority - see below); Register of Investment Funds (in Polish) (searchable only in person; however, the bulk of the data may be obtained from the combined search engine of the Polish Financial Supervision Authority - see below);
- District Court in Piotrków Trybunalski (Sąd Okręgowy w Piotrkowie Trybunalskim) – Register of Family Foundations (available on site only)
- Ministry of Foreign Affairs – List of European Groupings of Territorial Cooperation registered in Poland (in Polish) (downloadable list)
- Ministry of Infrastructure – info-car.pl website operated under contract with the Ministry by the Polish Security Printing Works – database of voivodeship road traffic centers (in Polish) (searchable)

Notably absent are:

- a central register of public cultural institutions. Each of the actual or potential parent entities (a ministry, a central government agency, or a territorial self-government unit) is obligated to maintain its own register of subordinate public cultural institutions, which results in almost 3000 separate official registers of such institutions, operated in various forms and independently of each other, each containing only a few to a dozen entries (if any), available on website of each of the parent entities;
- a register of homeowner communities
- a register of common land communities

==== Other general official business registers ====
- Ministry of Justice (MS):
  - National Register of the Indebted (Krajowy Rejestr Zadłużonych) — insolvency register separate from the KRS, designed to include entries on insolvent debtors: either private natural persons (e.g. child support, maintenance or tax debtors, consumer bankrupts), entrepreneurs, or any other legal entities, regardless whether they are registered in the National Court Register or the Central Registration and Information on Business (in Polish); (searchable)
  - Register of Pledges (Rejestr Zastawów) – allows to submit an inquiry concerning registered (thus legally binding) pledges and voluntary specific liens put on a collateral, either a movable, such as a vehicle (a road vehicle, a rolling stock vehicle, an aircraft, a boat, or a ship, excluding ships registered by one of the 2 maritime chambers in the Register of Ships, because they are covered by a dedicated instrument called ship mortgage), other types of machines, a controlled weapon, a movable object of cultural property, or on a security, as well as on an intellectual property right; the register is connected to the relevant vehicle, security, or intellectual property right register, in cases, where such exists (in Polish);
  - Land and Mortgage Register (Elektroniczne Księgi Wieczyste) – contains official and legally binding entries (done by selected sąd rejonowy courts) on real estate rights (including ownership), obligations (such as any pledges or liens), as well as warnings concerning unsettled or ongoing claims, any detected outdated entries (e.g. a dead person or a dissolved entity listed as owner), or any detected discrepancies with the referenced relevant Land and Buildings Records (the cadaster) entry – search by the register number (in Polish) (searchable);
  - National Criminal Register (Krajowy Rejestr Karny) – contains entries on all entities convicted and sentenced for a felony or crime, or for a fiscal felony or crime, either natural persons (including entrepreneurs), or (in selected types of felony or crime) juridical persons or other collective legal entities (such as trade partnerships) (in English) (access to data on a person or an entity is available on a paid request by the person or the entity concerned; on a paid request by an employer, in cases concerning a job restricted by law to unconvicted persons; on a paid request by a juridical person or other collective legal entity, in cases concerning membership of its governing body, status of its authorized signaotory, or acquisition of its shares, when restricted by law to unconvicted persons; on a free-of-charge-demand by an authorized public institution or authorities of another EU state (or a non-EU state, under an international agreement, or under the principle of reciprocity) );
- Central Office of Geodesy (Land Survey) and Cartography – Geoportal (in Polish) – provides access to the:
  - Land and Buildings Records (EGiB) – the official cadaster of land, buildings, and owner-occupancies,
  - Geodetic Records of Utilities Networks (GESUT) – the official cadaster of utilities networks,
- Ministry of Finance (MF) – Central Register of Beneficial Owners (CRBR) – a register of ultimate beneficial owners (in Polish) (searchable)
- National Fiscal Administration (KAS)
  - Central Register of Entities – National Register of Taxpayers (in Polish) – tax register which assigns the Tax Identification Number (NIP) to all taxable entities, including companies, with the exception of natural persons not registered in the Central Registration and Information on Business, as they are required to use their Personal Identification Number (PESEL) instead of NIP for tax purposes. It is mandatory to include both seller's and buyer's NIP on all invoices (excluding those concerning consumer sales to private natural persons, where only the seller's NIP is required); its validation is available online (NIP validity check) (in Polish);
    - List of VAT Taxpayers (so-called VAT white list) (in Polish) – list of registered, unregistered and deleted entities and restored to the VAT register (VAT status check by NIP);
      - List of EU VAT Taxpayers – includes those Polish taxpayers who obtained registration allowing to perform intra-community supply transactions and to use their NIP with the PL- prefix as their EU VAT number; not mandatory for VAT-exempt entities involved in intra-community supply transactions worth altogether less than 50000PLN in the given year, unless they do not perform services by delegating their employees to another EU country (EU VAT status check available through the EU-operated VAT Information Exchange System (in Polish);
  - Tax and Customs Service (SCS) – Electronic Services Portal of the Tax and Customs Service (PUESC) (in Polish) (searchable) – assigns the IDSISC number for customs or excise purposes, and provides access to the:
    - Central Register of Excise Entities (CRPA) – confirms granting of excise authorization to excise entities, supplies their data to the EU Excise Movement and Control System (EMCS) through the System for the Exchange of Excise Data (SEED), and registers their IDSISC number in the SEED PL database (searchable), IDSISC (SEED PL) number validation is also available on the website operated by the EU (in English) (SEED number check)
    - (EU customs) Registered Exporter System (REX) – registered Polish entities (searchable), REX number validation oś also available on the website operated by the EU (in English) (REX number check)
    - (EU customs) Economic Operator Identification and Registration System (EORI) (for registration purposes only) – EORI number validation is available on the website operated by the EU (in English) (EORI number check)
    - (EU customs) Economic Operator Systems Authorized Economic Operator Database (EOS AEO) (for registration purposes only) – Authorized Economic Operator Database is available on the website operated by the EU (in English) (searchable)
  - Register of Tax Liens – register of tax liens put on a collateral, either a movable, such as a vehicle (a road vehicle, a rolling stock vehicle, an aircraft, a boat, or a ship, excluding ships registered by one of the 2 maritime chambers in the Register of Ships, because they are covered by a dedicated instrument called ship mortgage), other types of machines, a firearm, a movable object of cultural property, or on a security, as well as on an intellectual property right; (searchable by serial or identification number) (in Polish);
- Polish Social Insurance Institution (ZUS) – Central Register of Contribution Payers (in English) (non-searchable) – tax register of all entities (including companies) paying compulsory social and health insurance contributions for their employees (or health insurance only, in the case of professions covered by special non-insurance pensions systems funded by the state budget: judges, public prosecutors, professional soldiers and members of other national uniformed services), as well as natural persons obligated to pay social and/or health insurance contributions for themselves (including sole traders, partners of a civil law partnership, registered partnership, limited partnership, limited joint-stock partnership, professional partnership, single-shareholder limited liability company, as well as artists), and people paying voluntary social and/or health insurance contributions; the register does not include individual farmers paying their social and health insurance contributions to the separate Agricultural Social Insurance Fund, as well as members of uniformed services delegated to work an undercover job. It does not assign a dedicated identification number, using the existing numbers (NIP, REGON, PESEL) for identification purposes instead;
- Agricultural Social Insurance Fund (KRUS) - Register of Agricultural Social Insurance and Health Insurance Contribution Payers (in Polish) (non-searchable) – tax register of individual farmers for the purposes of collecting compulsory agricultural social insurance and health insurance contributions. Farmers paying the agricultural social insurance for at least 3 years may register as entrepreneurs in CEIDG and engage in additional business activities while retaining the right to remain in the agricultural social insurance system, under the conditions that they continue agricultural production and do not exceed certain limits on income from the additional activity. Farmers may also pay to KRUS health insurance and diminished social insurance contributions (limited to sickness, maternity and accident insurance, but excluding the pension and disability insurance) for seasonal workers employed up to 180 days per year for harvesting fruits, vegetables, herbs, tobacco, hop, or flowers. Any other employees of a farmer fall under the general Social Insurance Institution system.
- Central Statistical Office (GUS) – National Official Business Register (in Polish) – statistical business register which assigns the Statistical Identification Number (REGON) to all public and private juridical persons, as well as all other entities, with the exception of natural persons other than entrepreneurs. It is mandatory to expose REGON on all company stamps as well as outbound documents and letters (searchable);
- Intellectual property registers
  - Patent Office of the Republic of Poland (UPRP) – Patent Office Registries e-Search (in Polish) industrial property database which includes trade marks, industrial designs, utility models, and integrated circuits (excluding those of the four types, which have been registered by the European Union Intellectual Property Office), as well as inventions (national patents), and (European Patent Office) European patents, including the EU unitary patents (but without their unitary effect due to Polish opt-out caused by EU's failure to award the Polish language the status in the scheme equal to that of German, English or French, and therefore, such patents are treated in Poland as ordinary EPO patents) (searchable)
  - Research Centre for Cultivar Testing (COBORU) – The List of Varieties Protected by Plant Breeders' Rights and The List of Varieties Which are the Subject of an Application for the Grant of the Plant Breeders' Rights – Protected by Provisional PBR – national register of plant breeders’ rights, does not include the varieties registered by the Community Plant Variety Office (in English) (downloadable list); List of breeders, breeders’ representatives and licensees (in English) (searchable); (some of these lists may also include individual farmers whose farms have not been registered as companies);
- Official vehicle registries
  - Chancellery of the Prime Minister of Poland – Central Registry of Vehicles and Drivers
    - Central Registry of Vehicles – contains data on all registered road vehicles. Vehicle History service (in English) (searchable by entering combination of vehicle registration number, date of first registration of the vehicle, and VIN number)
  - Office of Rail Transport (UTK) – National Rail Vehicle Registry (in Polish) (non-searchable);
  - Civil Aviation Authority (ULC) – Register of Civil Aircraft (in English) (non-searchable);
  - Registries of vessels (registration is permitted in only single of the five registries at a time, depending on the vessel's size, designation, equipment, usage, and ownership; some of the vessels may require an additional registration: by a ship classification society, or for the purposes of obtaining the ENI number, the IMO number, or the MMSI number - see sector specific registers and lists below; ships belonging to the Navy, the Border Guard or the Police are excluded from registration):
    - Ministry of Infrastructure – Registry of Yachts and Other Vessels up to 24 m in Length (in Polish) (searchable by entering combination of: vessel registration number; vessel identification number such as HIN Hull Identification Number, CIN Craft Identification Number, WIN Watercraft Identification Number, vessels lacking any of them are awarded INI Individual Identification Number at first registration; date of first registration of the vessel) – responsible for the registration of following vessels up to 24 meters in length: all yachts (defined as ships used exclusively for sports and recreation, including jetski, houseboats, and wooden replicas of historical vessels); inland or maritime non-commercial yachts; inland or maritime commercial yachts up to 12 passengers (including yachts used for paid cruises, training cruises, chartered cruises, commercial lending for recreational fishing and angling or for other purposes); other inland commercial and non-commercial fishing or angling vessels;
    - Inland Navigation Offices: in Bydgoszcz, in Szczecin, and in Wrocław – Administrative Registry of Inland Waterways Vessels (in Polish) (non-searchable) – registry of inland waterways vessels not covered by the Registry of Yachts and Other Vessels up to 24 m in Length;
    - Ministry of Agriculture and Rural Development (MRiRW) – Registry of Fishing Vessels(in Polish) (non-searchable at national level) – registry of Polish maritime commercial vessels used in fisheries within the Common Fisheries Policy (in English) (searchable via the EU Fleet Register operated by the European Commission)
    - Maritime Chambers: by the District Court in Szczecin and by the District Court in Gdańsk (seated Gdynia) – Registry of Ships (Rejestr okrętowy) (searchable in person on site free of charge, or on a written paid request, access unrestricted) – the primary official registry of all maritime ships used in international traffic and owned by Polish entities or other EU entities (if not registered in an other EU country), including merchant ships, excluding ships covered by the Registry of Yachts and Other Vessels up to 24 m in Length, or the Registry of Fishing Vessels. Contains information on all rights to the ship, as well as on all obligations (ship mortgage, ship liens). May also contain entries (on a voluntary basis) on maritime ships owned by entities other than Polish, which obtained temporary Polish registration, maritime ships under construction on the Polish territory, and maritime ships exempt from obligation to register by the Maritime Chamber (see below);
    - Maritime Offices: in Szczecin and in Gdynia: Administrative Registry of Maritime Ships (non-searchable) – obligatory registry for maritime ships exempt from registration in the ordinary Registry of Ships (maritime vessels not covered by the Registry of Yachts and Other Vessels up to 24 m in Length or by the Registry of Fishing Vessels, which are not used in international traffic: up to 15 m in length when equipped with mechanical propulsion, or any length when not equipped with mechanical propulsion) – unless owners of such vessel decided to waive exemption and choose to register in the regular Register of Ships;
- Office of Competition and Consumer Protection (UOKiK) – Public Aid Data Sharing System (in Polish) (searchable)
- Ministry of Agriculture and Rural Development (MRiRW) – Directory of Common Agricultural Policy Beneficiaries (in Polish) (searchable)
- Public Procurement Office – (UZP) e-Zamówienia (e-Procurement) Platform (in Polish) (searchable)
- National Institute of Cultural Heritage - Registry of Cultural Property(in Polish) (partially searchable) - operated by the Voivodeship Offices for Cultural Property Protection, include immovable (monuments, buildings), archeological, and movable (artifacts) cultural property, in the latter two cases excluding movable items included in the national library fonds, the national archival fonds or in an inventory of a registered museum
- Ministry of Interior and Administration - Arms Registration System (SRB) (non-searchable) - operated by the Policja and (in regard to private firearms of soldiers in active service) by the Military Gendarmerie; includes all firearms held by private persons, companies and public institutions, as well as their history, excluding the service firearms of the state uniformed services or other state armed formations (but not the municipal ones), issues the European Firearms Pass
- Internal Security Agency (ABW) – (civilian) list of entities holding industrial security clearance (in Polish) (downloadable list with levels of awarded clearances, and their applicability to NATO, EU or ESA classified information)
- Military Counterintelligence Service (SKW) – (military) list of issued industrial security clearances confirming the capability of an entrepreneur to protect classified information (in Polish) (downloadable lists with levels of awarded clearances, separately for national, NATO, EU and ESA classified information)
- Polish Financial Supervision Authority (KNF) – list of public stock issues after 1 January 2020 and their issuers (public companies) (in Polish) (searchable); list of public issues of financial instruments (including public stock issues) prior 1 January 2020 and their issuers (public companies, in the case of stocks) (in Polish) (downloadable list);
- Research and Academic Computer Network (NASK) State Research Institute - National Domain Register - the Polish country code top-level domain register, member of Council of European National Top Level Domain Registries and Country Code Names Supporting Organization (in English) (searchable)
- GS1 Poland Foundation - assigns the GTIN/EAN codes
- Warsaw Stock Exchange (GPW) Group
  - GPW Main Market (in English) – the regulated market;
  - NewConnect – an alternative (unregulated) stock exchange (multilateral trading facility), (in English)
- Central Securities Depository of Poland (KDPW) – central securities depository registering dematerialized securities and their owners, and the national numbering agency which assigns the Financial Instrument Short Name, Classification of Financial Instruments code, International Securities Identification Number, as well as Legal Entity Identifier. Its subsidiary KDPW_CCP is the national central counterparty clearing house.

==== Sector-specific registers and lists of regulated activities ====
- Polish Financial Supervision Authority (KNF) – register of securities listed on an exchange or on an alternative trading system; registers of various types of regulated financial entities (list incomplete): banks, co-operative banks, credit unions, pension funds, insurance companies, life insurance companies, mutual insurance companies, investment funds, stock exchanges, alternative trading systems, and commodities exchanges. A combined search engine. (in English)
- Polish Bar Council (NRA) – National Register of Barristers (and their offices) (in Polish) (searchable);
- National Chamber of Attorneys at Law (KIRP) – List of Attorneys at Law (and their offices) (in Polish) (searchable);
- National Council of Notaries (KRN) – List of notarial offices (in English) (searchable), available also through the EU e-Justice Portal (in English) (searchable), as well as the Council of the Notariats of the European Union (in English) (searchable)
- Polish Agency for Audit Oversight (PANA) – List of Audit Firms (in Polish) (searchable);
- National Chamber of Tax Advisors (KIDP) – Register of Juridical Persons Authorized to Perform Tax Advisory Activities (in Polish) (downloadable list); List of Tax Advisors (and either their offices, in the forms of sole tradeship, registered partnerships, limited partnerships, limited joint-stock partnerships, professional partnerships, or of juridical persons employing them) (in Polish) (downloadable list)
- Patent Office of the Republic of Poland (UPRP) – List of Patent Attorneys (and either their offices, in the forms of sole tradeship, registered partnerships, limited partnerships, limited joint-stock partnerships, professional partnerships, or of juridical persons employing them) (in Polish) (searchable)
- Ministry of Internal Affairs and Administration (MSWiA) – Register of Undertakings Licensed to Manufacture and Trade Explosives, Arms, Ammunition, and Devices or Technologies Designated for Police or Military Use (in Polish) (searchable); Register of Undertakings Performing Private Investigator Services (in Polish) (searchable); Register of Undertakings Licensed to Perform Personal and Property Protection Services (in Polish) (non-searchable); Register of Entities Performing Professional Lobbying Activities (in Polish) (downloadable list);
- Ministry of Finance (MF) – List of licensed casinos (in Polish) (downloadable list); List of licensed bookmakers and licensed internet gambling entities (in Polish) (downloadable list);
- Ministry of National Education (MEN) – Register of Schools and Educational Institutions (in Polish) – public and private schools and educational institutions, excluding higher education (searchable)
- Ministry of Science and Higher Education (MNiSW) – List of Non-Public Higher Education Institutions (in Polish) – list of licensed non-public universities and colleges (searchable)
- Ministry of Family, Labour and Social Policy (MRPiPS) – National Register of Employment Agencies (in Polish) (searchable); Register of Nurseries and Children's Clubs (in Polish) (searchable); Register of Social Assistance Units (in Polish) – register of public and private entities such as retirement homes, assisted living homes (but not nursing homes, as they are considered healthcare entities) (searchable)
- Ministry of Health (MZ)
  - Register of Entities Performing Medical Activities (RPWDL) (in Polish), consists of:
    - Register of Health Entities - includes public and private, commercial and non-commercial healthcare entities, registered by the relevant voivode, without caps on the numbers of medical professionals employed or (in case of private entities) specific restrictions on legal form or stakeholder composition of the entity; assigns an identification number (kod resortowy) to the whole entity, with an extension number for each of its organisational units; the catalogue of the covered types includes among others: hospitals, larger clinics (including dental), health spa entities, nursing homes, hospices, medical transport entities, diagnostic medical laboratories (obligated to register also on the List of Diagnostic Medical Laboratories of the National Chamber of Laboratory Diagnosticians (KIDL), as well as stores (dispensaries) employing qualified medical technicians or craftsmen, involved in retail, fitting and repairs of various medical prosthetic devices (such as glasses, dental prostheses, hearing aides, orthopaedic devices);
    - registers of individual and group professional practices of physicians, dentists, nurses, midwives, and physiotherapists (but excluding pharmacists, as pharmacies are registered in a separate register - see below, and laboratory diagnosticians, as a medical laboratory is in any case a health entity or a part of one - see above), operated by the respective regulatory colleges, with legal entity types limited exclusively to sole proprietorship in the case of individual practices, as well as to two types of trade partnerships (registered partnership or professional partnership) in the case of group practices; services are provided primarily by their owners, while employment of other-than-owner members of the same medical profession is generally prohibited, except for only a few specific situations, such as hiring for professional training, or hiring a temporary substitution during the owner's absence (searchable);
  - Register of Pharmacies - with the State Pharmaceutical Inspection organs fulfilling the role of registration authority; includes community pharmacies, community dispensaries (scope-limited, allowed exclusively in rural areas lacking otherwise a pharmacy), establishment pharmacies (in prisons or military garrisons), hospital pharmacies, hospital dispensaries other than pharmacies (scope-limited, fulfilling basic dispensary tasks, with more advanced functions outsourced to an external hospital pharmacy), the latter two types required to be also included as a unit of the parent entity in the Register of Health Entities (in Polish) (searchable);
  - Register of Pharmaceutical Wholesalers (in Polish) (searchable)
- National Health Fund (NFZ) – Central List of Healthcare Providers (CWŚ) (in Polish) – a public contract list of public and private healthcare providers operating under a contract with the NFZ within the general health insurance system (searchable)
- State Sanitary Inspection - Register of Establishments Producing or Marketing Food Subject to the Official Control of the State Sanitary Inspection (non-searchable) - includes farmers cultivating plants, wholesalers, retailers and other undertakings involved in production, processing or marketing of food intended for human consumption, other than production, processing or marketing of animal-derived food already supervised by the Veterinary Inspection), as well as all gastronomy establishments, and producers or recyclers of materials designated for contact with food intended for human consumption; Register of Cosmetic Product Producers (non-searchable); List of designated yellow fever vaccination centers (in Polish) (downloadable list)
- State Pharmaceutical Inspection (PIF) – Register of Manufacturers and Importers of Medicinal Products (in Polish) (searchable); National Register of Manufacturers, Importers and Distributors of Active Substances (in Polish) (searchable);
- Office for Registration of Medicinal Products, Medical Devices and Biocidal Products (URPLWMiPB) – Register of Medicinal Products and the Register of Marketing Aurhorization Holders – register of all medicines with market authorization in Poland; including those authorized by the European Medicines Agency (in Polish); Record of manufacturers of active substances used in the manufacture of veterinary medicinal products with anabolic, anti-infectious, anti-parasitic, anti-inflammatory, hormonal or psychotropic properties (in Polish) (non-searchable);
- Polish Medicines Verification Organisation Foundation (KOWAL) - national operator of the European Medicines Verification System (non-searchable)
- National Chamber of Laboratory Diagnosticians (KIDL) – List of Diagnostic Medical Laboratories – list of healthcare entities operating a clinical laboratory (in Polish) (searchable)
- Ministry of Agriculture and Rural Development (MRiRW) – Register of entities producing or bottling wine products (in Polish) (downloadable list); Register of entities producing or processing ethyl alcohol (in Polish) (downloadable list); Register of entities producing tobacco products (in Polish) (downloadable list); Register of entities producing or bottling liquor drinks (in Polish) (downloadable list); (some of these lists also include individual farmers whose farms have not been registered as companies);
- Veterinary Inspection (IW) – Lists and registers of supervised establishments, including: production, processing and marketing of meat, eggs, fish, milk, and dairy, production and marketing of animal feed, list of veterinary pharmaceutical wholesalers (some of these lists also include individual farmers whose farms have not been registered as companies) (in English) (downloadable lists);
- Polish National Veterinary Chamber (KILW) - List of Veterinary Care Establishments (in Polish) (searchable)
- State Plant Health and Seed Inspection Service (PIORiN) – various registers of undertakings performing activities related to plant health, plant protection products and equipment used to apply them, seed production, as well as integrated plant production (some of these lists also include individual farmers whose farms have not been registered as companies) (in Polish) (partially available as downloadable lists);
- National Support Centre for Agriculture (KOWR) (some of these lists also include individual farmers whose farms have not been registered as companies) – Register of biocomponent producers (in Polish) (downloadable list); Register of entities importing biocomponents (in Polish) (downloadable list); Register of farmers producing biofuels for their own use (in Polish) (downloadable list); Register of agricultural biogas producers (in Polish) (downloadable list); Register of first purchasers of cow milk (in Polish) (downloadable list);
- Agency for Restructuring and Modernisation of Agriculture (ARMiR) – Register of Producers, Agricultural Holdings and Applications for Payment Entitlements (in Polish) – system operated for the purposes of state-funded, EU-funded or co-funded payment mechanisms in agriculture and fisheries; its constituent Register of Producers includes agricultural producers, animal holders, beneficiaries of fisheries programmes, organizations of producers, entities operating a rendering plant, and potential beneficiaries, as well as their farmę agricultural holdings (non-searchable); (some of these lists also include individual farmers whose farms have not been registered as companies);
- Ministry of Sport and Tourism (MSiT) – Central List of Hotel Establishments – list of officially rated establishments providing legally specified services, including room service, bed-making and cleaning of sanitary facilities, at least on a daily basis, classified as: hotels, motels, boarding houses (all are rated category * to *****), trail shelters (rated "compliant"), inns, youth hostels, school youth hostels (all rated category I to III), as well as camping sites (rated category * to ****) and tent camp sites (rated "compliant"); it does not include certain other unrated and unclassified accommodation facilities (prohibited from using any of the abovementioned protected designations of type or category in their facility or company name), registered on a communal list only, such as hostels, holiday centres/dwellings, holiday youth centres, training-recreational centres, creative arts centres, complexes of tourist cottages, rooms for guests in private houses, private lodgings, rooms in spa healthcare entities, or agritourism facilities operated by farmers(in Polish) (searchable); List of Polish Sports Unions (in Polish) (list)
- Insurance Guarantee Fund (UFG) – Central Records of Tour Operators and Entrepreneurs Facilitating Linked Travel Arrangements (in Polish) (searchable); Database of Compulsory Vehicle Liability Insurance (in Polish) (insurance check by registration number)
- Office of Electronic Communications (UKE) – Register of Postal Operators (in Polish) (searchable); Register of Telecommunications Undertakings (in Polish) (searchable); Register of Maritime and Inland Ship Radio Station Permits with assigned ship callsigns, MMSI and ATIS numbers (in Polish) (downloadable list); registers of various other permits, including radiocommunication, radio and TV broadcasting permits (concerning exclusively technical aspects, while the issues such as awarding radio and TV broadcasting licenses, assessment of proposed format or evaluation of already broadcast content, are handled by the National Broadcasting Council (see below)
- Energy Regulatory Office (URE) – registries of various types of energy undertakings (list incomplete): holders of concessions for trade of liquid fuels, holders of concessions for trade of fuels other than liquid; electric energy distributors, operators of electric energy transmission systems; natural gas distributors, operators of natural gas transmission systems, natural gas storage facilities, natural gas liquefaction facilities, liquid natural gas regasification facilities. (in Polish) (downloadable lists)
- Polish Centre for Accreditation - list of accredited organisations (includes: testing, medical and calibration laboratories; management systems, persons and product certification bodies, inspection bodies etc.) (in English)
- Civil Aviation Authority (ULC) – List of Licensed Air Carriers, List of Holders of Air Operator Certificate (in English) (downloadable lists); List of holders of permits to provide ground handling services to third parties (in English) (downloadable list); List of Holders of Airport Handling Agent Certificate (in English) (downloadable list); List of Holders of Permits for Airport Management (in Polish) (downloadable list); Register of Civil Aerodromes, List of Officially Listed Civil Airfields (in Polish) (downloadable lists);
- Polish Register of Shipping – ship classification society recognized at national, EU (both maritime and inland shipping), and IMO levels, member of International Association of Classification Societies; it brokers assignment of the IMO number (in English) (earchable)
- Inland Navigation Offices (in Bydgoszcz, Szczecin and Warsaw) - Register of Ships Capable of Navigating on Inland European Waters – assigns the ENI number to vessels requiring classification by an EU-recognised inland ship classification society for navigation in EU inland waterways, upon their registration either in the Register of Inland Waterways Vessels or in the Register of Yachts and Other Vessels up to 24 m in Length (non-searchable);
- Office of Rail Transport (UTK) – List of licensed rail carriers (in Polish) (downloadable list);
- Inspection of Road Transport (ITD) – Polish Registry of Road Transport Undertakings (in English) (searchable)
- State Geological Institute-State Research Institute/State Geological Service (PIG-PIB/PSG) – System of management and protection of mineral resources in Poland – MIDAS (in Polish) – register of deposits, mining areas and mining countries as well as related concessions, synonymous with a mining cadaster (searchable)
- National Broadcasting Council (KRRiT) – List of public broadcasters (in English); List of licensed broadcasters, registered internet TV broadcasters, cable TV network and satellite TV platform operators (in English)

=== Portugal ===
- Citizen Portal – Company search (in Portuguese)
- Ministry of Justice – Entity Search

=== Romania ===
- Ministry of Public Finance – Business search (in Romanian)
- Ministry of Justice – The National Trade Register Office (ONRC) (registration required) (in Romanian)
- Financial Supervisory Authority (in Romanian)
- Bucharest Stock Exchange – Companies directory

=== Slovakia ===
- Companies Register of the Slovak Republic — searchable directory. (languages: Slovak, English)
- Self employed individuals register - searchable https://zrsr.sk/index (languages: Slovak, English)
- Industrial Property Office of the Slovak Republic - searchable https://wbr.indprop.gov.sk/WebRegistre/?Lang=en (languages: Slovak, English)
- companies and self employed individuals OSINT aggregators: https://finstat.sk/ & https://www.transparex.sk/

=== Slovenia ===
- Slovenian Business Register (ePRS) — maintained by the Agency of the Republic of Slovenia for Public Legal Records and Related Services (AJPES). ePRS includes companies (partnerships and corporations), sole proprietors, legal entities governed by private law, societies, natural persons performing registered or regulated activities, subsidiaries and other divisions of business entities and main offices of foreign business entities. (languages: interface in Slovene, English, German, Italian; information in Slovene, English)
- Firmica.si — provides company formation services in Slovenia; not an official registry
- List of taxable legal entities (Financial Administration) — (languages: Slovene)
- Central Securities Clearing Corporation
- List of public companies (Securities Market Agency)

=== Spain ===
- Central Mercantile Registry (Spanish: Registro Mercantil Central, RMC) — subscription service providing legal Information of companies, statistics, and company names. (languages: English, French, German, Spanish).
- Association of Spanish Property & Commercial Registers — subscription service
- National Securities Market Commission (Comisión Nacional del Mercado de Valores), search by entity — (languages: Spanish)

=== Sweden ===
- Companies Registration Office (Swedish: Bolagsverket) — (languages: Swedish, some English)
- Financial Supervisory Authority:
  - Listed company search (Börsinformation)
  - Company register

== Afghanistan ==
- Minister of Commerce and Industries – Central Business Registry

== Albania ==
Albania

- National Business Center (Qendra Kombetare e Biznesit)

== Algeria ==
- The National Center of The Trade Register (Centre National du Registre du Commerce (CNRC)) (in French) (registration required)

== Andorra ==
- Oficina de Marques

== Angola ==
- Ministry of Justice and Human Rights – Central Register of Business Names (Ficheiro Central de Denominações Sociais) (not searchable) (in Portuguese)
- Ministry of Finance – Registry of State Suppliers (registration required) (in Portuguese)

== Antigua and Barbuda ==
- Financial Services Regulatory Commission (not searchable)

== Argentina ==
- Ministry of Justice and Human Rights (in Spanish)
- Official Gazette (Click on "Sociedades") (in Spanish)
- Federal Administration of Public Revenue – tax identification number (CUIT) check (in Spanish)
- National Securities Commission – Issuers
- National Procurement Office – Providers (in Spanish)
- Ministry of Foreign Affairs and Worship – Directory of Importers/Exporters (in Spanish)

== Armenia ==
- Ministry of Justice – State Register of the Legal Entities
- Tax Service – Taxpayers
- Central Bank of Armenia – Listed Companies (in Armenian)

== Australia ==
- Australian Securities & Investments Commission – Search ASIC Registers
- Australian Securities & Investments Commission – Datasets
- Australian Business Register – Australian Business Number Lookup
- Office of the Registrar of Indigenous Corporations – Search Corporations

== Azerbaijan ==
- State Tax Service under the Ministry of the Economy of the Republic of Azerbaijan – State Register of Business Entities (in Azerbaijani)
- State Tax Service under the Ministry of the Economy of the Republic of Azerbaijan – Businesses engaged in production (in Azerbaijani)

== Bahamas ==
- Registrar General's Department

== Bangladesh ==
- Office of the Registrar of Joint Stock Companies and Firms

== Bahrain ==
- Ministry of Industry & Commerce
- Bahrain Chamber of Commerce & Industry – Members Search
- Central Bank of Bahrain – CBB Register

== Barbados ==
- Corporate Affairs and Intellectual Property Office – Registrants

== Belarus ==
Belarus

- Unified State Register of Legal Entities and Individual Entrepreneurs — Ministry of Justice (In Russian)

== Belize ==
- International Business Companies Registry of Belize

== Benin ==
- Ministry of Industry, Trade, Small and Medium Enterprises – Business Registry (GUFE) (in French)

== Bhutan ==
- Office of the Registrar of Companies, Corporate Regulatory Authority, MoENR (not searchable)

== Bolivia ==
- Registry of Commerce (Fundempresa) (in Spanish)

== Bosnia and Herzegovina ==
Bosnia and Herzegovina

- Federation of Bosnia and Herzegovina and Brčko District:
  - Registers of Business Entities
  - Registry of Securities – Issuers
- Republika Srpska:
  - Registers of Business Entities
  - Central Registry of Securities – Issuers

== Botswana ==
- Companies and Intellectual Property Authority

== Brazil ==
- BM&F Bovespa – Listed Companies
- Ministry of Finance – Federal Revenue – Legal entity tax identification number (CNPJ) search (in Portuguese)
- State registries
  - Department of Business Registration and Integration (DREI) – Map of commercial registries (juntas comerciais) (in Portuguese)

State/District	Searchable	Registry	Ref.
Acre	No	Commercial Registry of Acre (in Portuguese)	
Alagoas	Yes	Commercial Registry of Alagoas (registration required) (in Portuguese)	
Amapá	Yes	Commercial Registry of Amapá (registration required) (in Portuguese)	
Amazonas	No	Commercial Registry of Amazonas (registration required) (in Portuguese)	
Bahia	Yes	Commercial Registry of Bahia (in Portuguese)	
Ceará	No	Commercial Registry of Ceará (in Portuguese)	
Distrito Federal	Yes	Commercial Registry of Distrito Federal (registration required) (in Portuguese)	
Espírito Santo	Yes	Commercial Registry of Espírito Santo (in Portuguese)	
Goiás	No	Commercial Registry of Goiás (in Portuguese)	
Maranhão	No	Commercial Registry of Maranhão (in Portuguese)	
Mato Grosso	Yes	Commercial Registry of Mato Grosso (in Portuguese)	
Mato Grosso do Sul	No	Commercial Registry of Mato Grosso do Sul (in Portuguese)	
Minas Gerais	Yes	Commercial Registry of Minas Gerais (registration required) (in Portuguese)	
Pará	Yes	Commercial Registry of Pará (in Portuguese)	
Paraíba	No	Commercial Registry of Paraíba (in Portuguese)	
Paraná	Yes	Commercial Registry of Paraná (in Portuguese)	
Pernambuco	Yes	Commercial Registry of Pernambuco (in Portuguese)	
Piauí	No	Commercial Registry of Piauí (registration required) (in Portuguese)	
Rio de Janeiro	No	Commercial Registry of Rio de Janeiro (in Portuguese)	
Rio Grande do Norte	No	Commercial Registry of Rio Grande do Norte (in Portuguese)	
Rio Grande do Sul	Yes	Commercial Registry of Rio Grande do Sul (registration required) (in Portuguese)	
Rondônia	Yes	Commercial Registry of Rondônia (in Portuguese)	
Roraima	Yes	Commercial Registry of Roraima (in Portuguese)	
Santa Catarina	Yes	Commercial Registry of Santa Catarina (registration required) (in Portuguese)	
São Paulo	Yes	Commercial Registry of São Paulo (in Portuguese)	
Sergipe	Yes	Commercial Registry of Sergipe (in Portuguese)	
Tocantins	No	Commercial Registry of Tocantins (in Portuguese)	

== Brunei ==
- Brunei Attorney General's Chamber

== Burkina Faso ==
- House of Enterprises (Maison de l'Entreprise) – Company search (in French)

== Burundi ==
- Investment Promotion Authority (not searchable)

== Cambodia ==
- Ministry of Commerce – Business Registration

== Cameroon ==
- Chamber of Commerce, Industry, Mines and Crafts (CCIMA) – Company Directory (in French)
- Chamber of Commerce, Industry, Mines and Crafts (CCIMA) – Database of Industrial Enterprises (in French)
- Ministry of Economy, Planning, and Regional Development – Business Directory (Annuaire des entreprises)
- National Institute of Statistics – List of companies (in French)

== Canada ==
- Corporations Canada – Search for a Federal Corporation
- Canada's Business Registries (allows searches in federal and provincial registries)
- Provincial and territorial registries

Province/Territory	Freely searchable	Register	Ref.
Alberta	Yes	Service Alberta (licensed businesses only)	
British Columbia	No	British Columbia Corporate Registry (subscription required)	
Manitoba	No	Manitoba Companies Office (subscription required)	
New Brunswick	No	Corporate Affairs Registry Database	
Newfoundland and Labrador	Yes	Companies and Deeds Online	
Northwest Territories	Yes	Department of Justice – Corporate Registry	
Nova Scotia	Yes	Registry of Joint Stock Companies	
Nunavut	Yes	Department of Economic Development and Transportation	
Nunavut	No	Department of Justice – Corporate Registries	
Nunavut	Yes	Inuit Firm Registry	
Ontario	No	Ontario Business Registry (subscription required)	
Prince Edward Island	Yes	PEI Business / Corporate Registry	
Quebec	Yes	Registraire des entreprises Quebec (in French)	
Saskatchewan	No	Saskatchewan Corporate Registry (subscription required)	
Yukon	No	Department of Community Services – Corporate Affairs	
Yukon	Yes	Yukon Chamber of Commerce – Business Directory	

== Cape Verde ==
- Official Gazette (subscription required) (in Portuguese)

== Central African Republic ==
- Ministry of Commerce and Industry (in French)
- Ministry for the Promotion of Small and Medium Enterprises (in French)

== Chad ==
Chad

- Business Formalities Center of National Agency for Investments and Exports of Chad.

== Chile ==
- Registry of Commerce of Santiago (in Spanish)
- Official gazette (in Spanish)
- Securities and Insurance Supervisor (in Spanish)
- Ministry of Finance – Directory of Providers (in Spanish)

== China, People's Republic of ==
- State Administration for Market Regulation (in Chinese)
- Credit China (in Chinese)
- Ministry of Commerce – Corporate Credit Rating System (in Chinese)
- State Administration of Taxation – Corporate credit rating inquiry (in Chinese)
- Provincial, sub-provincial and municipal registries
  - Anhui Province – Anhui Administration for Industry and Commerce (in Chinese)
    - Hefei – Hefei Administration for Industry and Commerce (in Chinese)
  - Beijing – Beijing Administration for Industry and Commerce (in Chinese)
  - Chongqing – Chongqing Administration for Industry and Commerce (in Chinese)
  - Chongqing – Chongqing Enterprise Credit Information System (in Chinese)
  - Fujian Province – Fujian Administration for Industry and Commerce (in Chinese)
  - Fujian Province – Fujian Enterprise Credit Information System (in Chinese)
    - Fuzhou – Fuzhou Enterprise Credit Information System (in Chinese)
    - Xiamen – Xiamen Enterprise Credit Information System (in Chinese)
  - Gansu – Gansu Administration for Industry and Commerce (in Chinese)
  - Guangdong – Guangdong Administration for Industry and Commerce (in Chinese)
    - Guangzhou – Guangzhou Administration for Industry and Commerce (in Chinese)
    - Guangzhou – Guangzhou Commercial Registration Information (in Chinese)
    - Shenzhen – Market Supervision Administration of Shenzhen Municipality (in Chinese)
    - Shenzhen – Shenzhen Enterprise Credit Information System (in Chinese)
  - Guangxi – Guangxi Administration for Industry and Commerce (in Chinese)
  - Guizhou – Guizhou Administration for Industry and Commerce (in Chinese)
  - Guizhou Province – Guizhou Enterprise Credit Information System (in Chinese)
    - Guiyang – Guiyang Administration for Industry and Commerce (in Chinese)
  - Hainan – Hainan Administration for Industry and Commerce (in Chinese)
  - Hebei – Hebei Administration for Industry and Commerce (in Chinese)
  - Heilongjiang – Heilongjiang Administration for Industry and Commerce (in Chinese)
  - Heilongjiang Province – Heilongjiang Enterprise Credit Information System (in Chinese)
    - Harbin – Harbin Enterprise Credit Information System (in Chinese)
  - Henan – Henan Administration for Industry and Commerce (in Chinese)
  - Hubei – Hubei Administration for Industry and Commerce (in Chinese)
    - Wuhan – Wuhan Administration for Industry and Commerce (in Chinese)
  - Hunan – Hunan Administration for Industry and Commerce (in Chinese)
  - Hunan Province – Hunan Enterprise Credit Information System (in Chinese)
  - Inner Mongolia – Inner Mongolia Administration for Industry and Commerce (in Chinese)
- Inner Mongolia – Inner Mongolia Enterprise Credit Information System (in Chinese)
  - Jiangsu -– Jiangsu Administration for Industry and Commerce (in Chinese)
    - Wuxi – Wuxi Enterprise Credit Information System (in Chinese)
  - Jiangxi – Jiangxi Administration for Industry and Commerce (in Chinese)
  - Jilin – Jilin Administration for Industry and Commerce (in Chinese)
  - Liaoning – Liaoning Administration for Industry and Commerce (in Chinese)
  - Liaoning Province – Liaoning Enterprise Credit Information System (in Chinese)
    - Dalian – Dalian Administration for Industry and Commerce (in Chinese)
    - Dandong – Dandong Administration for Industry and Commerce (in Chinese)
    - Shenyang – Shenyang Administration for Industry and Commerce (in Chinese)
  - Ningxia Hui Autonomous Region – Ningxia Administration for Industry and Commerce (in Chinese)
  - Qinghai – Qinghai Administration for Industry and Commerce (in Chinese)
  - Shaanxi – Shaanxi Administration for Industry and Commerce (in Chinese)
  - Shaanxi Province – Shaanxi enterprise credit information system (in Chinese)
    - Xi'an – Xi'an Administration for Industry and Commerce (in Chinese)
  - Shandong – Shandong Administration for Industry and Commerce (in Chinese)
    - Dongying – Dongying Enterprise Credit Information System (in Chinese)
    - Qingdao – Qingdao Administration for Industry and Commerce (in Chinese)
    - Weihai – Weihai Administration for Industry and Commerce (in Chinese)
  - Shanghai – Shanghai Administration for Industry and Commerce (in Chinese)
  - Shanxi – Shanxi Administration for Industry and Commerce (in Chinese)
  - Sichuan – Sichuan Administration for Industry and Commerce (in Chinese)
  - Sichuan Province – Sichuan Enterprise Credit Information System (in Chinese)
    - Chengdu – Chengdu Administration for Industry and Commerce (in Chinese)
  - Tianjin – Tianjin City Administration for Industry and Commerce (in Chinese)
    - Binhai – Binhai company search (in Chinese)
  - Tibet Autonomous Region – Tibet Administration for Industry and Commerce (in Chinese)
  - Xinjiang Uyghur Autonomous Region – Xinjiang Administration for Industry and Commerce (in Chinese)
  - Yunnan – Yunnan Administration for Industry and Commerce (in Chinese)
    - Kunming – Kunming Administration for Industry and Commerce (in Chinese)
  - Zhejiang – Zhejiang Administration for Industry and Commerce (in Chinese)
  - Zhejiang Province – Zhejiang Enterprise Credit Information System (in Chinese)
    - Hangzhou – Hangzhou Administration for Industry and Commerce (in Chinese)
    - Hangzhou – Hangzhou Enterprise Credit Information System (in Chinese)
- Special Administrative Territories
  - Hong Kong
    - Hong Kong Integrated Companies Registry Information System (ICRIS) – Companies Register
    - Inland Revenue Department – Business Registration Number Enquiry
    - Securities and Futures Commission – Public Register of Licensed Persons and Registered Institutions
  - Macau
    - Government Printing Bureau
    - Directorate of Justice Affairs Services (not searchable)

== China, Republic of (Taiwan) ==
- Ministry of Economic Affairs
  - Company Registration Enquiry (in Chinese)
  - Business registration lists (in Chinese)
  - Business registration lists (by municipality) (in Chinese)
  - List of Taiwanese companies in mainland China (in Chinese)
  - List of Taiwanese companies doing business outside of Taiwan (in Chinese)
  - List of non-Taiwanese companies registered in Taiwan (in Chinese)
- Taiwan Stock Exchange – Market Observation Post System

== Colombia ==
- Unified Commercial and Social Registry (RUES) (in Spanish)
- Superintendency of Corporations
  - Business Check (in Spanish)
  - SIREM Company Search (in Spanish)
- Superintendencia Financiera de Colombia – Comprehensive Stock Market Information System (SIMEV) (in Spanish)

== Congo, Democratic Republic of the ==
- Ministry of Justice and Human Rights – Business Registry (Guichet unique) (in French)

== Congo, Republic of the ==
- National Center for Statistics and Economic Studies (in French) – "Base de données"
- Official gazette (in French)

== Cook Islands ==
- Financial Supervisory Commission – Registrar's Office (not searchable)

== Costa Rica ==
- National Registry (registration required) (in Spanish)
- General Directorate Of Taxation (DGT) – Company check (in Spanish)
- Government Procurement System – Provider search (in Spanish)

== Côte d'Ivoire ==
- Center for Investment Promotion – Company search (in French)

== Cuba ==
- National Office of Statistics – Registries (in Spanish)

== Danish realms ==
- Faroe Islands: Company Registration Authority
- Greenland: Greenland Business Register — (language: Danish)

== Djibouti ==
- Office of Industrial Property and Commerce (ODPIC) – Official Bulletin (in French)

== Dominica ==
- Companies and Intellectual Property Office – Name search

== Dominican Republic ==
- Generate Directorate of Internal Revenue (DGII) – Tax-paying companies search (in Spanish)
- Generate Directorate of Internal Revenue (DGII) – Companies without operations (in Spanish)
- National Office of Industrial Property (ONAPI) – Trade name search (in Spanish)
- General Directorate of Public Procurement – Provider search (in Spanish)
- Santo Domingo – Santo Domingo Chamber of Commerce and Production (in Spanish)

== Dutch Caribbean ==
- Aruba: Aruba Chamber of Commerce and Industry
- Bonaire: Bonaire Commercial Register
- Curaçao: Curaçao Chamber of Commerce & Industry
- Caribbean Netherlands
  - Saba: Sint Eustatius and Saba Commercial Register
  - Sint Eustatius: Sint Eustatius and Saba Commercial Register
  - Sint Maarten: St. Maarten Chamber of Commerce & Industry (not searchable)

== Ecuador ==
- Superintendency of Companies (in Spanish)
- Internal Revenue Service (SRI) – Tax Authority (in Spanish)
- National Institute of Statistics and Census (INEC) – Statistics Authority (in Spanish)
- National Secretariat of Policy Management – Directory of Social Organizations (in Spanish)
- Official Public Procurement System – Government Provider search (in Spanish)

== Egypt ==
- Ministry of Industry and Foreign Trade – Egyptian International Trade Point
- General Authority for Free Zones and Investment

== El Salvador ==
- National Center of Registries – List of registered businesses (in Spanish)
- Official Gazette search (in Spanish)
- Salvadoran Institute of Social Security – Solvent companies (in Spanish)
- Public Procurement Unit (UNAC) – List of providers (in Spanish)

== Eritrea ==
- Ministry of Information – Official journal (Haddas Ertra) (in Tigrinya)

== Ethiopia ==
- Ministry of Trade
- Ministry of Tourism

== Fiji ==
- Fiji Government – Companies and Business Registration (registration required)

== Gabon ==
- Investment Promotion Agency (Centre de Développement des Entreprises) (not searchable) (in French)

== Georgia ==
Georgia

- D&B Report Guide Georgia — summary of legal forms and filing requirements. (languages: Georgian only)
- Public Registry — (languages: Georgian only)

== Ghana ==
- Registrar General's Department
- Public Procurement Authority – Registered Suppliers and Contractors

== Grenada ==
- Registrar of Companies and Intellectual Property (not searchable)

== Guatemala ==
- Mercantile Registry (subscription required) (in Spanish)
- State Procurement System – Provider search (in Spanish)

== Guinea ==
- Investment Promotion Agency (in French)

== Guyana ==
- Ministry of Legal Affairs – Deeds Registry (not searchable)
- The Official Gazette of Guyana
- Georgetown – Georgetown Chamber of Commerce & Industry – Directory of Members

== Haiti ==
- Ministry of Commerce and Industry – Electronic Commerce Registry (in French)

== Hong Kong ==
- Business Registration Office (of the Inland Revenue Department)
- Companies Registry

== Honduras ==
- Chamber of Commerce and Industry (in Spanish)
- Executive Directorate of Income – company tax identification code (RTN) check (in Spanish)
- State Office Procurement (ONCAE) – Provider search (in Spanish)

== India ==
- Ministry of Corporate Affairs –

== Indonesia ==
- Ministry of Industry – Industrial Company Directory (in Indonesian)
- Ministry of Trade – Corporate Directory
- Indonesian Chamber of Commerce and Industry (KADIN) (in Indonesian)
- Indonesia Charter bus – Transportation

== Iran ==
- Iranian Judiciary System -Properties and documents registration administration under Iranian trade law(SSAA) Legal Entities National ID Portal (in Persian) Official Journal (RRK) (in Persian) older archived url https://web.archive.org/web/gazette.ir
- Official Journal (Dastour) (in Persian)
- Tehran – Tehran Chamber of Commerce and Industries and Mines – Trade Directory (in Persian)

== Iraq ==
- Ministry of Trade – Iraq Registrar of Companies
- Baghdad – Chamber of Commerce – Companies Search (in Arabic)
- Erbil – Chamber of Commerce and Industry – Companies List

== Israel ==
- Justice Ministry – Israeli Corporations Authority
- Justice Ministry – Israeli Corporations Authority (in Hebrew) – Additional details available in company extract
- Israel Securities Authority – List of Public Companies
- Ministry of Construction – Contractors Registrar

== Jamaica ==
- Office of the Registrar of Companies
- National Contracts Commission – Registered Contractors

== Japan ==
- Ministry of Economy, Trade and Industry – Company Search (registration required) (in Japanese)
- Ministry of Internal Affairs and Communications – Statistical business register (ja:事業所母集団データベース, Jigyōsho Boshūdan Dētabēsu; lit. 'establishment frame database')

== Jordan ==
- Companies Control Department (in Arabic)
- Ministry of Industry and Trade – Trade Names
- Securities Depository Center – Public Shareholding Companies

== Kazakhstan ==
- Ministry of Justice – Database of legal entities
- State Revenue Committee – Legal entities
- Business Licenses

== Kenya ==
- State Law Office – Registrar General (not searchable)
- National Construction Authority – Registered Contractors

== Kiribati ==
- Ministry of Commerce, Industry and Cooperatives (not searchable)

== Kosovo ==
- Ministry of Trade and Industry – Business Registration Agency

== Kuwait ==
- Kuwait Chamber of Commerce and Industry – Company Search (in Arabic)
- Kuwait Stock Exchange – Listed Companies

== Kyrgyzstan ==
- Ministry of Justice – Register of Legal Entities (in Russian)

== Laos ==
- Ministry of Industry and Commerce – Registered Enterprises

== Lebanon ==
- Investment Development Authority of Lebanon

== Lesotho ==
- Ministry of Trade, Industry, Cooperatives and Marketing

== Liberia ==
- Liberia Business Registry

== Libya ==
- Libyan Commercial Registry. (in Arabic) Available only for Libyan residents after registration.

== Madagascar ==
- Economic Development Board of Madagascar – List of companies
- General Directorate of Taxes (DGI) – Taxable entity search (registration required) (in French)

== Malawi ==
- Ministry of Justice and Constitutional Affairs – Registrar General (not searchable)

== Malaysia ==
- Companies Commission of Malaysia – Company search (subscription required)
- Labuan – Labuan Financial Services Authority (registration required)

== Maldives ==
- Ministry of Economic Development

== Mali ==
- Investment Promotion Agency (in French)

== Marshall Islands ==
- Marshall Islands Maritime & Corporate Administrators

== Mauritania ==
- Chamber of Commerce, Industry, and Agriculture (Click on "Répertoires des entreprises") (in French)

== Mauritius ==
- Ministry of Finance and Economic Development – Corporate and Business Registration Department

== Mexico ==
- Secretariat of Economy
  - National Business Information Registry (SIEM) (in Spanish)
  - Company name search (in Spanish)
  - Integrated System of Registry Management (SIGER) – list of all state and municipal commercial registries (in Spanish)
- Mexican Institute of Industrial Property – Trade name search (in Spanish)
- Registry of Suppliers and Contractors (RUPC) (in Spanish)
- ProMéxico – Directory of Exporters (in Spanish)
- State registries

State/District	Searchable	Registry	Ref.
Aguascalientes	No	Public Registry of Property and Commerce of Aguascalientes (in Spanish)	
Baja California	No	Public Registry of Property and Commerce of Baja California (in Spanish)	
Baja California Sur	No	Public Registry of Property and Commerce of Baja California Sur (in Spanish)	
Campeche	No	Public Registry of Property and Commerce of Campeche (in Spanish)	
Chiapas	No	Public Registry of Property and Commerce of Chiapas (in Spanish)	
Chihuahua	Yes	Public Registry of Property and Commerce of Chihuahua (subscription required) (in Spanish)	
Coahuila	Yes	Public Registry of Property and Commerce of Coahuila (subscription required) (in Spanish)	
Colima	No	Public Registry of Property and Commerce of Colima (in Spanish)	
Durango	No	Public Registry of Property and Commerce of Durango(in Spanish)	
Guanajuato	Yes	Public Registry of Property and Commerce of Guanajuato (subscription required) (in Spanish)	
Guerrero	No	Public Registry of Property and Commerce of Guerrero (in Spanish)	
Hidalgo	No	Public Registry of Property and Commerce of Hidalgo (in Spanish)	
Jalisco	Yes	Public Registry of Property and Commerce of Jalisco (registration required) (in Spanish)	
Mexico City	No	Public Registry of Property and Commerce of Mexico City (in Spanish)	
Mexico State	No	Public Registry of Property and Commerce of Mexico State (in Spanish)	
Michoacán	No	Public Registry of Property and Commerce of Michoacán (in Spanish)	
Morelos	No	Public Registry of Property and Commerce of Morelos (in Spanish)	
Nayarit	No	Public Registry of Property and Commerce of Nayarit (in Spanish)	
Nuevo León	No	Public Registry of Property and Commerce of Nuevo León (in Spanish)	
Oaxaca	No	Public Registry of Property and Commerce of Oaxaca (in Spanish)	
Puebla	No	Public Registry of Property and Commerce of Puebla (in Spanish)	
Querétaro	Yes	Public Registry of Property and Commerce of Querétaro (registration required) (in Spanish)	
Quintana Roo	No	Public Registry of Property and Commerce of Quintana Roo (in Spanish)	
San Luis Potosí	No	Public Registry of Property and Commerce of San Luis Potosí (in Spanish)	
Sinaloa	No	Public Registry of Property and Commerce of Sinaloa (in Spanish)	
Sonora	No	Public Registry of Property and Commerce of Sonora (in Spanish)	
Tabasco	No	Public Registry of Property and Commerce of Tabasco (in Spanish)	
Tamaulipas	No	Public Registry of Property and Commerce of Tamaulipas (in Spanish)	
Tlaxcala	No	Public Registry of Property and Commerce of Tlaxcala (in Spanish)	
Veracruz	No	Public Registry of Property and Commerce of Veracruz (in Spanish)	
Yucatán	No	Public Registry of Property and Commerce of Yucatán (in Spanish)	
Zacatecas	No	Public Registry of Property and Commerce of Zacatecas (in Spanish)	

== Micronesia, Federated States of ==
- Registrar of Companies – Listing of FSM Corporations

== Moldova ==
Moldova

- Licensing Chamber
- Ministry of Justice
  - State Registration Chamber (in Romanian)
  - State Register of non-profit Organizations (in Romanian)
- State Tax Service
  - Taxable entity search (in Romanian) – search by Unique State Identification Number (IDNO)
  - List of taxable entities (in Romanian)

== Monaco ==
- Registry of Commerce and Industry (in French)

== Montenegro ==
Montenegro

- Central Registry of Business Entities
- Montenegro Stock Exchange – Company search

== Mongolia ==
- General Authority for State Registration

== Morocco ==
- Central Trade Registry (OMPIC) (subscription required) (in French)
- Central Trade Registry (OMPIC) (in French)
- Financial Markets Authority (CDVM) – Listed Companies
- Casablanca – Register of Commerce (in French)
- Fès – Register of Commerce (in French)
- Marrakech – Register of Commerce (in French)
- Meknès – Register of Commerce (in Arabic)
- Oujda – Register of Commerce (in Arabic)
- Rabat – Register of Commerce (in French)
- Salé – Register of Commerce (in French)
- Tangier – Register of Commerce (in French)

== Mozambique ==
- Bulletin of the Republic (in Portuguese)

== Myanmar ==
- Directorate of Investment and Company Administration

== Namibia ==
- Business and Intellectual Property Authority

== Nauru ==
- Registrar of Corporations

== Nepal ==
- Office of Company Registrar

== New Zealand ==
- Companies Office – Search for companies, company directors or shareholders

== Nicaragua ==
- Ministry of Development, Industry and Trade (in Spanish)
- General Revenue Service (DGI) – Business search (in Spanish)
- General Directorate of State Procurement – Provider search (in Spanish)

== Niger ==
- National Institute of Statistics – Directory of Companies (in French)

== Nigeria ==
- Corporate Affairs Commission
- Bureau of Public Procurement – Registered Contractors

== Niue ==
- Companies Office of Niue

== North Macedonia ==
- Central Registry (in Macedonian)
- Securities and Exchange Commission – Registry of joint stock companies

== Oman ==
- Ministry of Commerce and Industry – Search Company Listings
- Oman Chamber of Commerce and Industry – Trade Directory

== Pakistan ==
- Securities and Exchange Commission of Pakistan – Company Name Search

== Palau ==
- Office of the Attorney General – Registrar of Corporations (not searchable)

== Palestine ==
- Ministry of National Economy – Companies Registry

== Panama ==
- Public Registry of Panama (registration required) (in Spanish)
- Panama Emprende at the Ministry of Commerce and Industries

== Papua New Guinea ==
- Investment Promotion Authority – Entity Search

== Paraguay ==
- Ministry of Finance – Taxable entity search (in Spanish)
- Find out the address of any RUC (in Spanish)
- List of rucs (in Spanish)
- Undersecretary of State Taxation (SET) – company tax identification number (RUC) check (in Spanish)
- National Directorate of Public Procurement – Provider search (in Spanish)

== Peru ==
- National Superintendency of Public Registries (SUNARP) (in Spanish)
- National Superintendency of Customs and Tax Administration (SUNAT) (in Spanish)
- National Superintendency for Banks, Insurance Companies and Pension Fund Administrators (SBS) (in Spanish)
- National Superintendency for the Securities Market (SMV) - Supervised companies search (in Spanish)
- Supervisory Agency for State Contracts (OSCE) – Provider search (in Spanish)

== Philippines ==
See also: List of legal entity types by country - Philippines

- Philippine Business Hub
- Department of Trade and Industry – Business Name Registration System (BNRS)
- Securities and Exchange Commission – Electronic Simplified Processing of Application for Registration of Company (eSPARC)
- Cooperative Development Authority - Cooperative Registration Information System (CoopRIS)

== Qatar ==
- Ministry of Business and Trade – Companies Control Department (Hukoomi) (registration required)
- Qatar Chamber of Commerce and Industry – Business Directory
- Qatar Financial Centre Authority – Public Register

== Russia ==
Russian Federation

- Federal Tax Service – Unified State Register of Legal Entities and is responsible for issuing Primary State Registration Number known in its acronym OGRN (Russian: ОГРН) in accordance with Federal Law No. 129-ФЗ "On State Registration of Legal Entities and Individual Entrepreneurs", adopted 8 August 2001 and entering into force on July 1, 2002.
- National Classifier of Enterprises and Organizations (in Russian)

== Rwanda ==
- Office of the Registrar General (ORG)
- Rwanda Revenue Authority – VAT Registered Taxpayers

== San Marino ==
San Marino

- Trade Register

== Saint Kitts and Nevis ==
- Financial Services Regulatory Commission – Registrar of Companies (registration required)
- Nevis Financial Regulatory Services Commission

== Saint Lucia ==
- Registry of Companies and Intellectual Property (ROCIP)
- Registry of International Business Companies and International Trusts (Pinnacle)

== Saint Vincent and the Grenadines ==
- Commerce and Intellectual Property Office (subscription required)

== Samoa ==
- Samoa Business Registry

== São Tomé and Príncipe ==
- Ministry of Justice – Company Registry

== Saudi Arabia ==
- Ministry of Commerce and Industry (in Arabic)
- Saudi Arabian General Investment Authority – License Search (in Arabic)
- Riyadh – Riyadh Chamber of Commerce & Industry (in Arabic)
- Jeddah – Jeddah Chamber of Commerce & Industry – Business Directory

== Senegal ==
- Business Creation Support Bureau

== Serbia ==
Serbia

- Serbian Business Registers Agency — runs three registers. (languages: Serbian)
  - Business Register — business entities and entrepreneurs
  - Register of Pledges over Movable Property and Rights
  - Register of Financial Leasing
- Central Securities Depository and Clearing House — includes ownership structure of companies
- Public Company Register — maintained by the Securities Commission. (languages: Serbian)
- Lists of Providers of Financial Services (National Bank of Serbia)

== Seychelles ==
- Seychelles Business Register (onshore companies only)
- Seychelles Financial Services Authority (not searchable)

== Sierra Leone ==
- Office of the Administrator and Registrar General

== Singapore ==
- Accounting and Corporate Regulatory Authority – Entity search (subscription required)
- Inland Revenue Authority of Singapore – GST Registered Business Search
- Monetary Authority of Singapore – Financial Institutions Directory

== Solomon Islands ==
- Solomon Islands Business Registry

== South Africa ==
- Companies and Intellectual Property Commission (CIPC)

== South Korea ==
- Start-Biz Online (in Korean)
- Small and Medium Business Administration (in Korean)
- Supreme Court – Registry (in Korean)
- Financial Supervisory Service – Repository of Korea's Corporate Filings

== South Sudan ==
- Ministry of Justice – Business Registry (not searchable)

== Sri Lanka ==
- Department of Registrar of Companies

== Sudan ==
- Ministry of Justice – Commercial Registrations Department (in Arabic)

== Suriname ==
- Chamber of Commerce and Factories
- Ghana-Suriname Chamber of Commerce
- Suriname-Guyana Chamber of Commerce
- Suriname-Guyana Chamber of Commerce
- Suriname-India Chamber of Commerce and Industry
- Suriname-Netherlands Chamber of Commerce

== Switzerland ==
Switzerland — Swiss company registers are organized at cantonal level. (There are currently around 45 cantonal commercial registers in Switzerland.)

- Central Business Names Index (Zefix) — maintained by the Federal Commercial Registry Office. Contains information of corporate bodies (corporations, corporations with unlimited partners, limited liability companies, co-operatives, non-profit associations and foundations) and public-law corporations registered in the Commercial Register. (languages: English, French, German, Italian)
  - Swiss Commercial Gazette (SHAB) — official gazette that publishes new entries and changes in the commercial register.
- Moneyhouse (moneyhouse) — maintained by the Neue Zürcher Zeitung (NZZ). Contains information of ultimate beneficial owners, corporate bodies and public-law corporations registered in the Commercial Register. (languages: English, French, German, Italian)

== Tajikistan ==
- Tax Committee – Register of Legal Entities (in Russian)

== Tanzania ==
- Business Registrations and Licensing Agency (BRELA)

== Thailand ==
- Ministry of Commerce – Department of Business Development

== Timor-Leste ==
- Institute for Business Support – Enterprises
- Service Registry and Company Verification (not yet searchable) (in Portuguese)
- Official Gazette (in Portuguese)

== Tonga ==
- Business Registries Office

== Togo ==
- Business Start-up Center (in French)

== Tunisia ==
- Registry of Commerce (in French)
- Agency for the Promotion of Industry and Innovation – Directory of industrial enterprises

== Turkey ==
- Union of Chambers and Commodity Exchanges of Turkey – Turkish Trade Registry Gazette
- Central Registration System (MERSİS) (registration required) (in Turkish)
- Turkish Standards Institution – Company Search
- Adana – Adana Chamber of Commerce – Trade Name Search
- Aksaray – Aksaray Chamber of Commerce (in Turkish)
- Bursa – Bursa Chamber of Commerce and Industry – Search for Member Companies
- Gaziantep – Gaziantep Chamber of Commerce – Member Search (in Turkish)
- Istanbul – Istanbul Chamber of Commerce – Company Search
- Konya – Konya Chamber of Commerce – Company Directory (in Turkish)
- Mersin – Mersin Chamber of Commerce (in Turkish)

== Trinidad and Tobago ==
- Companies Registry
- Trinidad and Tobago Securities and Exchange Commission – Registered Companies, Individuals & Securities

== Uganda ==
- Uganda Registration Services Bureau
- Register of Providers

== Ukraine ==
Ukraine

- State Enterprise Information Resource Centre (Ukrainian: Інформаційно-ресурсний центр - Пошук в ЄДР) — official, searchable companies register for Ukraine. (languages: Ukrainian only)
- State Fiscal Service:
  - Business Search — (languages: Ukrainian only)
  - Register of VAT payers — (languages: Ukrainian only)
  - Register of Fixed (or single) tax payers — (languages: Ukrainian only)
- State Commission for Regulation of Financial Services Markets:
  - Integrated Information System — (languages: Ukrainian only)
  - Other registers — (languages: Ukrainian only)
- Unified Register of Civic Organizations — maintained by the Ministry of Justice

== United Arab Emirates ==
- Ministry of Economy – Business Name Search
- Capital Market Authority – Company Details
- Abu Dhabi – Department of Economic Development – Trade Name Search
- Abu Dhabi – Abu Dhabi Business Center – Business License Search
- Abu Dhabi – Abu Dhabi Chamber of Commerce and Industry – Commercial Directory
- Abu Dhabi – Abu Dhabi Global Market Registration Authority
- Abu Dhabi – Abu Dhabi Securities Exchange – Listed Companies
- Ajman – Chamber of Commerce and Industry – Commercial Search
- Ajman – Chamber of Commerce and Industry – Industrial Search
- Ajman – Ajman Free Zone – Directory
- Dubai – Department of Economic Development – Trade Name Search
- Dubai – Dubai Chamber of Commerce and Industry – Commercial Directory
- Dubai – Dubai Financial Market – Listed Companies
- Dubai – Dubai Financial Services Authority – Public Register
- Dubai – Dubai Multi Commodities Centre - DMCC official Website
- Dubai – Dubai International Financial Centre – Client Directory
- Dubai – Dubai Airport Freezone – Directory
- Dubai – Jebel Ali Free Zone – Client Directory
- Dubai – Dubai Internet City – Partners Directory
- Dubai – Dubai Knowledge Village – Partners Directory
- Dubai – NASDAQ Dubai – Listed Companies
- Fujairah – Chamber of Commerce and Industry – Business Directory
- Fujairah – Fujairah Free Zone – Company Listing
- Ras Al Khaimah – Ras Al Khaimah Investment Authority
- Sharjah – Sharjah Chamber of Commerce and Industry – Business Directory
- Sharjah – Hamriyah Free Zone – Directory
- Sharjah – Sharjah Airport International Free Zone – Investor Directory
- Umm al-Quwain – Chamber of Commerce and Industry (in Arabic)

== United Kingdom ==
- United Kingdom
  - Companies House — the official UK body to which UK companies must send their accounts. Companies House has two ways to search for company and director information:
    - WebCHeck
    - Disqualified Directors Register
  - Financial Services Register (Financial Conduct Authority)
- British Overseas Territories
  - Anguilla: Anguilla Financial Services — Anguilla Commercial Online Registration Network (ACORN) (registration required)
  - Bermuda: Registrar of Companies
  - British Virgin Islands: Financial Services Commission — Registry of Corporate Affairs (not searchable)
  - Cayman Islands:
    - General Registry (subscription)
    - Cayman Islands Monetary Authority — Search for Entities
  - Gibraltar
    - Companies House Gibraltar (subscription required)
  - Montserrat: Financial Services Commission — not searchable
  - Turks and Caicos Islands: Financial Services Commission, companies registry — not searchable
- Crown Dependencies
  - Guernsey
    - Guernsey Registry — includes the Bailiwick of Guernsey Intellectual Property Office which administers all trademark and design registrations and activities, and provides information on the intellectual property laws enacted in the Bailiwick.
  - Isle of Man
    - The Companies Registry — responsible for the regulation of Manx companies, as well as the administration of legislation relating to foreign companies, limited liability companies, business names, limited partnerships, and societies incorporated under the Industrial and Building Societies Acts. It is part of the Isle of Man Government. There is a searchable directory.
  - Jersey
    - JFSC Companies Registry — maintained by the Jersey Financial Services Commission.

== United States ==
- U.S. Securities and Exchange Commission – Search for Company Filings
- State registries

State	Department/Agency	Ref.
Alabama	Secretary of State of Alabama	
Alaska	Alaska Department of Commerce, Community and Economic Development	
Arizona	Arizona Corporation Commission	
Arkansas	Secretary of State of Arkansas	
California	Secretary of State of California	
Colorado	Secretary of State of Colorado	
Connecticut	Secretary of the State of Connecticut	
Delaware	Secretary of State of Delaware	
Florida	Secretary of State of Florida	
Georgia	Secretary of State of Georgia	
Hawaii	Department of Commerce and Consumer Affairs (DCCA)	
Idaho	Secretary of State of Idaho	
Illinois	Illinois Secretary of State	
Indiana	Secretary of State of Indiana	
Iowa	Iowa Secretary of State	
Kansas	Secretary of State of Kansas	
Kentucky	Secretary of State of Kentucky	
Louisiana	Secretary of State of Louisiana	
Maine	Secretary of State of Maine	
Maryland	Maryland State Department of Assessments and Taxation	
Massachusetts	Massachusetts Secretary of the Commonwealth	
Michigan	Department of Licensing and Regulatory Affairs	
Minnesota	Minnesota Secretary of State	
Mississippi	Secretary of State of Mississippi	
Missouri	Missouri Secretary of State	
Montana	Secretary of State of Montana	
Nebraska	Secretary of State of Nebraska	
Nevada	Secretary of State of Nevada	
New Hampshire	New Hampshire Secretary of State	
New Jersey	New Jersey Department of the Treasury	
New Mexico	New Mexico Public Regulation Commission	
New York	Secretary of State of New York	
North Carolina	North Carolina Secretary of State	
North Dakota	North Dakota Secretary of State	
Ohio	Ohio Secretary of State	
Oklahoma	Oklahoma Secretary of State	
Oregon	Oregon Secretary of State	
Pennsylvania	Secretary of the Commonwealth of Pennsylvania	
Rhode Island	Secretary of State of Rhode Island	
South Carolina	Secretary of State of South Carolina	
South Dakota	Secretary of State of South Dakota	
Tennessee	Tennessee Secretary of State	
Texas	Secretary of State of Texas	
Texas	Texas Comptroller of Public Accounts	
Utah	Utah Division of Corporations and Commercial Code	
Vermont	Secretary of State of Vermont	
Virginia	State Corporation Commission	
Washington	Secretary of State of Washington	
West Virginia	Secretary of State of West Virginia	
Wisconsin	Wisconsin Department of Financial Institutions	
Wyoming	Secretary of State of Wyoming	

- District/Territorial registries

Jurisdiction	Department/Agency	Ref.
District of Columbia	Department of Consumer and Regulatory Affairs – Corporations Division	
Guam	Department of Revenue and Taxation – General Licensing and Registration Branch	
Northern Mariana Islands	Department of Commerce – Registrar of Corporation	
Puerto Rico	Puerto Rico Department of State	
United States Virgin Islands	Division of Corporations and Trademarks	

== Uruguay ==
- Dirección General de Registros (DGR)
- Agency for Development of Electronic Government and Society of Information and Knowledge (AGESIC) – Incorporated businesses (e-Diario) (in Spanish)
- Ministry of Industry, Energy and Mining – Directory of Industrial Enterprises (in Spanish)
- National Institute of Statistics – Directory of Micro, Small and Medium Enterprises (in Spanish)
- Official Gazette search (in Spanish) (registration required)
- State Purchasing and Contracting Agency – Provider search (in Spanish)
- Investment and Export Promotion Institute – Directory of Exporters (in Spanish)

== Uzbekistan ==
- Registration of limited, stock and other types of the companies are made on municipal level. Online registration of companies and register is available in the center of state services Bir Darcha.

== Vanuatu ==
- Vanuatu Financial Services Commission

== Venezuela ==
- National Procurement Service (RNC) – Registered government contractor search (in Spanish)
- SENIAT – company tax identification code (RIF) check (in Spanish)
- Supreme Tribunal of Justice – Official Gazette (in Spanish)
- Autonomous Registries and Notaries Service (not searchable) (in Spanish)

== Vietnam ==
- Ministry of Planning and Investment – Agency of Business Registration
- Ministry of Planning and Investment – E-gazette search
- Ministry of Finance – General Department of Taxation – Taxpayer Directory (in Vietnamese)

== Yemen ==
- Ministry of Industry and Trade (in Arabic)

== Zambia ==
- Patents and Companies Registration Agency
- Zambia Revenue Authority – Taxpayer Search (Click on "Other e-Services")

== Zimbabwe ==
- Department of Deeds, Companies & Intellectual Property

== Other ==
- the European Business Register Network (EBR) is a network of trade registers kept by the registration authorities in most of the European countries

== See also ==
- Corporate Registers Forum
- European business register
- International Business Registration Number (IBRN)
- Legal Entity Identifier
- List of financial supervisory authorities by country
- List of offshore financial centres
- List of stock exchanges
- OpenCorporates
- Statistical business register
- OpenRegistry
