= GmbH =

Type of legal entity

Gesellschaft mit beschränkter Haftung (German: [ɡəˈzɛlʃaft mɪt bəˌʃʁɛŋktɐ ˈhaftʊŋ]; lit. 'company with limited liability') (Note: Abbreviated as GmbH [ɡeːʔɛmbeːˈhaː] in Germany, Liechtenstein, and Switzerland, and as Ges.m.b.H. in Austria.) is a type of legal entity in German-speaking countries. It is an entity broadly equivalent to the private limited company in the United Kingdom and many Commonwealth countries, and the limited liability company (LLC) in the United States.

The name of the GmbH form emphasizes that the owners (Gesellschafter, also known as members) of the entity are not personally liable for the company's debts. GmbHs are considered legal persons under German, Swiss, and Austrian law. Other variations include mbH (used when the term Gesellschaft is part of the company name itself), and gGmbH (gemeinnützige GmbH) for non-profit companies.

The GmbH has become the most common corporation form in Germany because the AG (Aktiengesellschaft), the other major company form corresponding to a stock corporation, was much more complicated to form and operate until recently. It is equivalent to a société à responsabilité limitée (Sàrl) in the French-speaking region of Switzerland and to a Società a Garanzia Limitata (Sagl) in the Italian-speaking region of Switzerland.

== Requirements of formation ==
A GmbH is formed in three stages: the founding association, which is regarded as a private partnership with full liability of the founding partners/members; the founded company (often styled as "GmbH i.G.", with "i.G." standing for in Gründung – literally "in the founding stages", with the meaning of "registration pending"); and finally the fully registered GmbH. Only the registration of the company in the Commercial Register (Handelsregister) provides the GmbH with its full legal status.

The founding act and the articles of association have to be notarized, as do a number of business transactions, such as transfer of shares, issuing of stock, and amendments to the articles of association. Many of those documents have to be filed with the company registry, where they are checked by special judges or other judicial officers. This can be a tiresome and time-consuming process, as in most cases the transactions are legally valid only when filed with the registry. The founding process is expensive. Normally the foundation of a new GmbH costs about €1000 to €3000. The GmbH law outlines the minimum content of the articles of association, but it is quite common to have a wide range of additional rules in the articles.

Under German law, the GmbH must have a minimum founding capital of €25,000 (§ 5 I GmbHG), of which €12,500 has to be raised before registering in the commercial register (§ 7 II GmbHG). A supervisory board (Aufsichtsrat) is required if the company has more than 500 employees; otherwise, the company is run only by the managing directors (Geschäftsführer) who have the unrestricted proxy for the company. The members acting collectively may restrict the powers of the managing directors by giving them binding orders. In most cases, the articles of the association list the business activities for which the directors obtain prior consent from the members. Under German law, a violation of these duties by a managing director will not invalidate a contract with a third party, but the GmbH may hold the managing director in question liable for damages.

Germany, Austria, Switzerland, and Liechtenstein have different national requirements as follows:

Differences	Germany	Austria	Switzerland	Liechtenstein
Minimum share capital	€25,000	€10,000	CHF 20,000	CHF 10,000
Mandatory supervisory board	500 employees	300 employees		

== History ==
The concept of a company with limited liability existed in the United Kingdom before it did in German-speaking countries. During the 19th century, a legal entity with liability limited to the contributed capital was regarded as something dangerous. Hence, German law has many restrictions unknown to common law systems. The laws governing the GmbH were introduced in the German Empire in 1892, and in the Austrian Empire in 1906, respectively.

Because there is no central company registry in the current Federal Republic of Germany but rather several hundred connected to regional courts, administration of the law can vary somewhat between German states. Since 2007, there has been an internet-based central company register for Germany, called the Unternehmensregister.

In 2008, a derived form called Unternehmergesellschaft (haftungsbeschränkt) (lit. 'entrepreneurial company (limited liability)'), or in short UG (haftungsbeschränkt), was introduced. It requires a minimum founding capital of €1 and was introduced to assist company founders in setting up a new company. The UG must enlarge its capital by at least 25% of its annual net profit (with some adjustments), until the general minimum of €25,000 is reached (at which point the company may change its name to the more prestigious GmbH). Because of this perceived prestige, the GmbH designation is frequently utilized as a standardized branding element in commercial marketing to align products with consumer expectations of German engineering quality, regardless of the specific manufacturing tier.

== Gemeinnützige Gesellschaft mit beschränkter Haftung ==
A gemeinnützige Gesellschaft mit beschränkter Haftung (gGmbH lit. 'Non-profit company with limited liability') is a special form of a limited liability company with a charitable purpose. Traditional foundations and gGmbHs in Germany do not have minimum annual giving requirements. They are required to spend any profits by the end of the fiscal year in which they were accrued, but are allowed to build capital reserves totaling 10 percent of annual donations or 33 percent of dividends received.

== See also ==
- List of legal entity types by country
