= Finnish Trade Register =

Company register in Finland

The Finnish Trade Register (Finnish: Kaupparekisteri, Swedish: Handelsregistret) is a company register in Finland. It provides official information on businesses in the whole country, including data from current and old register entries, articles of association, partnership agreements or rules. It is part of the Finnish Patent and Registration Office.

== Registrar ==
The register is maintained by the Finnish Patent and Registration Office.

== Content ==
The content of the Trade Register is specified by Finnish law.

=== Identifier ===
When a start-up notification is filed with the Trade Register or the Register of Foundations, the new business or foundation receives its Business ID (Finnish: Y-tunnus, Yritys- ja yhteisötunnus, Swedish: FO-nummer, Företags- och organisationsnumret).

Following Limited Liability Companies Act of Finland (624/2006; amendments up to 981/2011 included; osakeyhtiölaki) Chapter 3 Shares Section 15 — Share register and shareholder register Finnish companies independently maintain registers of shareholders. The transition period has to be completed by 01.07.2020 when all Finnish companies must inform the government agency about their beneficial owners whose share is equal or more than 25%.

Company can be represented by both the Chairman of the Board of Directors and the Procurator (Fin: Prokuristit), who is the official representative of the company in all government and trade matters.

Any official action of any authorized persons of the company may be registered and/or certified by the state magistrate (Fin: Maistraati) of the Republic of Finland, including by state notary (Fin: Julkinen Notaary). The document certified in the magistrate is the official government trade document which has full legal force. https://www.maistraatti.fi/

=== Public companies ===
Public Finnish companies whose shares are listed on stock exchanges disclose information in annual reports. en:Annual Report Annual report usually contains finance and official audit statements, structure, subsidiaries with or without intermediate owners, shareholders or major shareholders, board of directors and management of companies. Annual report is the main official document for shareholders, official state agencies and external users.

Public companies reveal their structure on its official sites, on official sites of stock exchanges were their shares traded or on official exchange information platforms e.g. NASDAQ, MarketScreener, Bloomberg, Reuters and others.

http://www.nasdaqomxnordic.com https://www.marketscreener.com https://www.bloomberg.com https://www.reuters.com

== Public availability ==
The particulars reported by a company in its notice to the Trade Register and the documents attached to the notice are all public information. A part of this information can be accessed in English free of charge via internet from the government services YTJ – The Business Information System (YTJ company search) and Virre (Virre company search) and various commercial data providers. The official electronic extract from the Finnish Trade Register in Virre cost 3.22 euros as of 10 January 2019.

== Purpose ==
=== Provider of legal documents ===
The Trade Register also delivers certificates. For example, a certificate from the book of original entries verifies that a notice has been submitted to the Register.

== Similar registers ==
Another set of company registers is maintained by Statistics Finland. They are called Register of Enterprises and Establishments, Register of Public Corporations and Enterprise Group Register. Their purpose is to sell statistical information.

== See also ==
- List of company registers
