= Kamer van Koophandel =

Chamber of Commerce in the Netherlands

Agency overview
- Formed: 1803
- Jurisdiction: The Netherlands
- Website: kvk.nl

The Kamer van Koophandel (KVK) is the Chamber of Commerce in the Netherlands. The KVK's main statutory tasks are to operate the official national Business Register and provide businesses with information and advice. It is operated as a quango, guided by the Wet op de Kamer van Koophandel (Chamber of commerce law) 2013 and the Handelsregisterwet (Trade registry law) 2007.

It is a member of the European Business Register.

== See also ==
- List of company registers
