= Statistics Bureau (Japan) =

Statistical agency of Japan

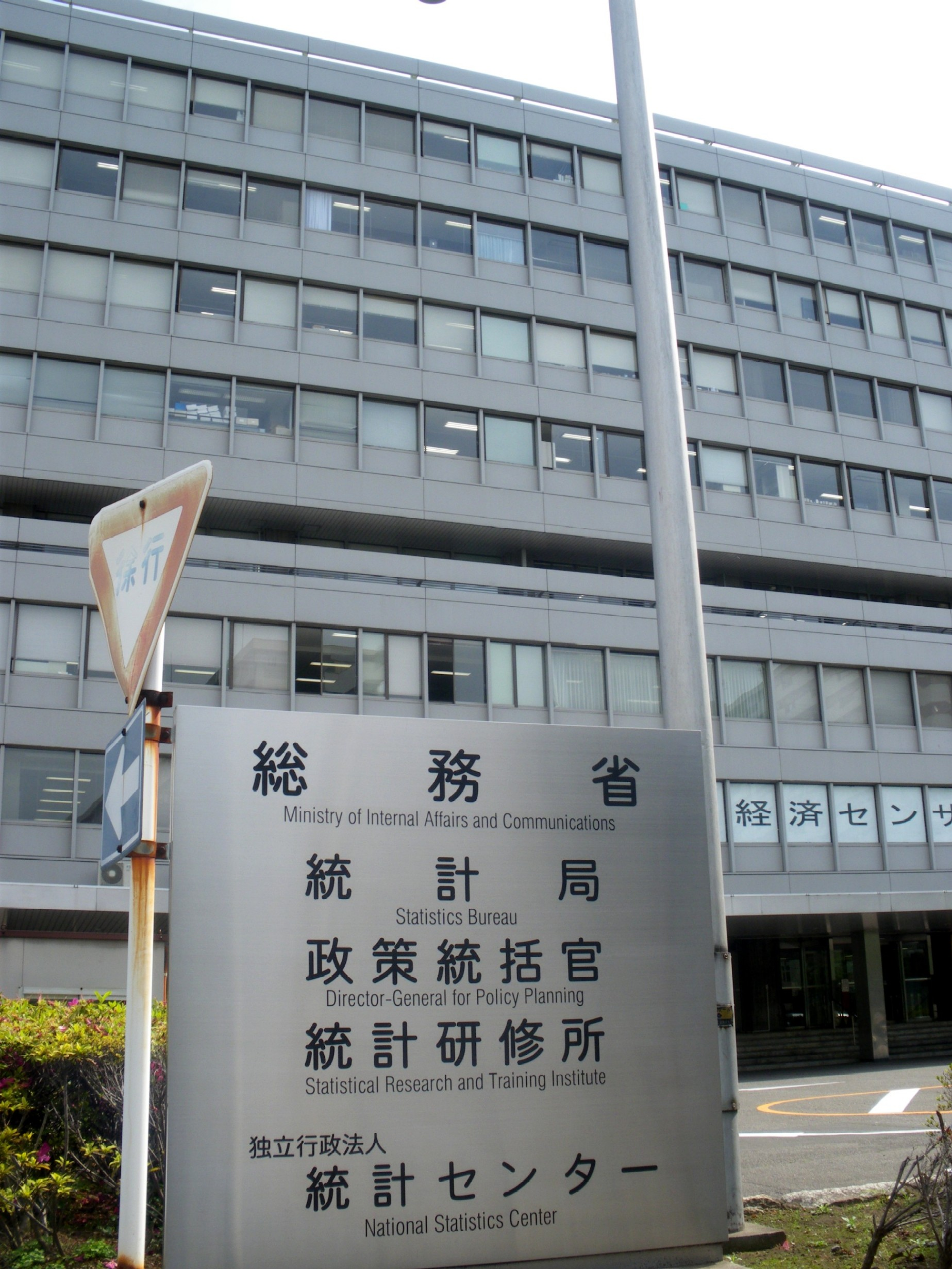
The Second Government Office of the houses the headquarters of the SBJ

The Statistics Bureau of Japan or SB/SBJ (統計局, Tōkeikyoku) is the statistical agency of Japan, subordinate to the Ministry of Internal Affairs and Communications (MIC). The SBJ have conducted the Population Census and large-scale surveys to establish key official statistics of Japan. It is also in charge of the management of the public online system of official statistics, international cooperation with other countries' statistics offices, and research and publication regarding statistics. Its headquarters is in the ministry's Second Government Office (第2庁舎), in Wakamatsu-cho, Shinjuku, Tokyo, near Wakamatsu-kawada Station of the subway Toei Ōedo Line. The National Statistics Center (NSTAC) and the MIC Director-General for Policy Planning are in the same building.

Brief history of the SBJ and related organizations

Statistics Division (1871)
Tōkeiin (1881)
Cabinet Statistics Bureau (1885)
Census Office (1920)
SBJ (born 1922)
Statistics Commission (1946)
Statistics Standards Department (1952-1984)	Statistics Council (1952)
NSTAC (1984–)
MIC Director-General (2005–)
Statistics Commission (2007–)

Japan's official statistics system is so "decentralized" that various ministries and agencies have their own statistical departments. The SBJ is the oldest among them. The SBJ's chronological table starts from 1871, when the pre-constitutional Meiji government founded the Statistics Division (政表課, Seihyōka) (Note: Seihyō (政表 or 製表) was a Japanese translation of the word "statistics" used in the late-19th century. There were other translations used in those days, for example, kokusei (国勢), hyōki (表記 or 表紀), and sutachisuchikku (スタチスチック). Instead of these, the Japanese translation of tōkei (統計) eventually became established.) under the Dajōkan system, appointing Sugi Kōji to its director. After frequent changes in the government organization, the Cabinet Statistics Bureau (内閣統計局, Naikaku Tōkeikyoku) was established in 1885 with the Cabinet system starting. In 1920 it was reorganized as Census Office (国勢院, Kokuseiin) to conduct the first Population Census (国勢調査, Kokusei Chōsa), but in 1922 it was re-reorganized to the Statistics Bureau as an agency of the Cabinet. Since then, it has used the name of Statistics Bureau (Tōkeikyoku). Despite some changes in its affiliation, (Note: History of affiliation of the SBJ: the Cabinet (1922–1942), the Planning Institute (1942–1943), the Cabinet (1943–1947), the Prime Minister's Agency (総理庁, Sōri-chō) (1947–1949), the Office of the Prime Minister (1949–1984), the Management and Coordination Agency (1984–2001), and the MIC.) it has kept the identity at least since the 1880s.

Among the 54 fundamental statistics designated by the government under the Statistics Act (2007 Act No. 53), the SBJ makes 13 through statistical surveys, for example, Population Census, Labour Force Survey (労働力調査, Rōdōryoku Chōsa), and Family Income and Expenditure Survey (家計調査, Kakei Chōsa). (Note: The Vital Statistics (人口動態統計, Jinkō Dōtai Tōkei) and the Monthly Labour Survey were also started by the SBJ. They were respectively transferred to the Ministry of Health and Welfare in 1947 and to the Ministry of Labour in 1948. Since the two ministries were merged in 2001, the surveys have been conducted by the Ministry of Health, Labour and Welfare.) Derived statistics produced from a mixture of existing statistics such as Population Estimates (人口推計, Jinkō Suikei) and Consumer Price Index as well as register-based statistics of companies and establishments – Statistical Business Register (事業所母集団データベース, Jigyōsho Boshūdan Dētabēsu) – are also within the SBJ's coverage.

The SBJ thus conducts a number of nation-wide cyclic surveys. However, the SBJ is located in the capital city and has no local branch. For nation-wide surveys, each local government's statistical division, called Tōkei Shukan (統計主管), conducts survey work in behalf of the SBJ. This system was started for the first Population Census in 1920 and legally established in 1947 with fiscal backup from the national budget. Other ministries also use this system to conduct nation-wide surveys, unless they use their own local branch offices.

== Organization ==
The organization of the MIC follows the Cabinet Order (2000 No. 246). The following explanations are based on the articles of the Cabinet Order as on April 25, 2024, but English translations are from the information dated September 2021.

The Statistical Standards Department (統計基準部, Tōkei Kijunbu) was abolished in 2005. See #MIC Director-General for Policy Planning below.

=== Statistical Survey Department ===
Based on the Article 2 of the Cabinet Order, the SBJ has the Statistical Survey Department (統計調査部, Tōkei Chōsabu) to conduct the census and surveys. The following divisions have been established under this Department (Articles 110, 115–118).

- Population Census Division (国勢統計課, Kokusei Tōkeika) is in charge of the Population Census, Population Estimates, and other statistical surveys on demography, workforce, housing, and land use. (Article 116)
- Economic Statistics Division (経済統計課, Keizai Tōkeika) is in charge of statistical surveys of companies or their offices and factories. (Article 117)
- Consumer Statistics Division (消費統計課, Shōhi Tōkeika) is in charge of statistics on consumers and prices including the Consumer Price Index. (Article 118)
- Survey Planning Division (調査企画課, Chōsa Kikakuka) is in charge of a variety of derived statistics as well as general matters for this Department. (Article 115)

=== Other divisions ===
The Articles 110–114 of the Cabinet Order also have provisions about the following divisions under the SBJ.

- Statistical Business Register Management Division (事業所情報管理課, Jigyōsho Jōhō Kanrika) is in charge of data collection regarding Statistical Business Register. (Article 112)
- Statistics Information Utilization Promotion Division (統計情報利用推進課, Tōkei Jōhō Riyō Suishinka) is in charge of promotion of public use of statistics and microdata, publication and dissemination of knowledge about official statistics, and management of the Statistical Library (統計図書館, Tōkei Toshokan). (Article 113)
- General Affairs Division (総務課, Sōmuka) is in charge of general matters for the SBJ as well as the management of the National Statistics Center (統計センター, Tōkei Sentā) and the Statistical Research and Training Institute (統計研究研修所, Tōkei Kenkyū Kensyū-jo). (Article 111)
- Director for Management of Statistical Information Systems (統計情報システム管理官, Tōkei Jōhō Shisutemu Kanrikan) is in charge of the information systems for the SBJ and for the MIC's Director-General for Policy Planning, including the Inter-Ministry Information System for Official Statistics. (Article 114)

== Cooperation within the central statistical system ==
The SBJ cooperates with other entities in the central government, such as the NSTAC, the Director-General for Policy Planning of the MIC, the Statistics Commission, and the Statistical Research and Training Institute, as well as the statistical departments from various ministries.

=== National Statistics Center ===
The National Statistics Center (NSTAC) was historically a segment of the SBJ specializing in tabulation. In 1984, this segment was separated from the SBJ to establish the NSTAC. In 2003, it became an Incorporated Administrative Agency. It processes data for various ministries including the SBJ.

The NSTAC and the SBJ also collaborate to develop the Inter-Ministry Information System for Official Statistics, the public online system for statistical surveys and data use. It includes subsystems as follows:

- Portal Site of Official Statistics: e-Stat
- Portal site for secondary use of microdata: miripo (ミクロデータ利用ポータルサイト, Mikuro Dēta Riyō Pōtaru Saito)
- Online Survey System: e-survey
- Statistical Business Register

The Statistical Data Utilization Center (統計データ利活用センター, Tōkei Dēta Rikatsuyō Sentā) is a new institution run by the SBJ and the NSTAC. It was established in 2018 in Wakayama to offer services of on-site use of microdata, training of statisticians, and consulting about the use of statistics.

=== MIC Director-General for Policy Planning ===
The Statistics Act provides that the Minister for Internal Affairs and Communications has the authority of planning and supervising the whole of the official statistics system, following the advice of the Statistics Commission. The minister delegates these tasks to the Director-General for Policy Planning (not to the SBJ) since 2005.

The authority of supervision and planning of the official statistics system derived from the former Statistics Commission (統計委員会, Tōkei Iinkai) (1946–1952). Since the abortion of the Commission in 1952, its responsibilities had been taken by the Commissioner of the Administrative Management Agency consulting the Statistics Council (統計審議会, Tōkei Shingikai), the advisory board with expert statisticians. For this purpose, the Administrative Management Agency included the Statistical Standards Department. The Department inherited the function of the Statistics Commission.

As a result of the restructuring of governmental organizations in 1984, the Statistical Standards Department was merged into the SBJ. The Department had thus subordinated to the SBJ from 1984 to 2005. During this period, the government organizations were restructured again in 2001, by which the SBJ moved to the MIC.

In 2005, the MIC disestablished the Statistical Standards Department and transferred its functions to one of the Director-Generals for Policy Planning (政策統括官, Seisaku Tōkatsukan) of the ministry. This position was initially referred to as in charge of "Statistical Standards" (統計基準, Tōkei Kijun), but since 2021 it has been in charge of "Statistical Policy" (統計制度, Tōkei Seido).

This Director-General of the MIC is also in charge of international communication with statistics offices of other countries, in collaboration with the SBJ.

=== Statistics Commission ===
The new Statistics Commission was established by the full amendment of the Statistics Act in 2007. It is a council handling the official statistics system, made up from 13 or fewer academic experts. It was a substitute for the Statistics Council, but was provided a broader authority. The revision of the Statistics Act in 2018 further extended the Commission's authority to control the whole of the official statistics. It manages the Master Plan Concerning the Development of Official Statistics (公的統計の整備に関する基本的な計画, Kōteki Tōkei no Seibi ni Kansuru Kihontekina Keikaku), reviews the plan and process of each of fundamental statistics, maintains statistical standards such as Japan Standard Industrial Classification, and supervises the anonymization of micro data for secondary use of statistics.

=== Inter-ministry activities ===
The statistical departments from various ministries, including the SBJ, hold conferences (各府省統計主管部局長等会議, Kaku-fu-shō Tōkei Shukan Bukyoku-chō-tō Kaigi) to discuss issues on official statistics. During 2001–2007, when the Statistics Council lost the authority to actively offer its opinion to the government as a result of the 2001 Central Government Reform, these inter-ministry conferences were the substantial opportunity for decisions on technical matters regarding the statistics system.

=== Statistical Research and Training Institute ===
The Statistical Research and Training Institute is located in Kokubunji in the west of Tokyo Prefecture. It has its root in the Statistics Staff Training Institute (統計職員養成所, Tōkei Shokuin Yōsei-jo) established in 1921. It became an independent educational institute of the MIC in 2003 and included the function of research that had been performed by the SBJ in 2017. The institute has thus conducted research of statistical technologies as well as training of statisticians. The SBJ is in charge of affairs related to the Institute.

== Library and museum ==
The Statistical Library is officially a branch of the National Diet Library. It holds collections related to statistics as well as unpublished tables on microfilm. The Statistical Library also offers a reference service on the use of statistics of Japan. The SBJ is in charge of the management of the library.

The SBJ also runs the Statistical Museum (統計博物館, Tōkei Hakubutsukan). This museum holds historical materials regarding Japan's official statistics.

== Publication ==
The SBJ compiles statistical yearbooks such as Japan Statistical Yearbook (日本統計年鑑, Nihon Tōkei Nenkan), Statistical Handbook of Japan, and Statistical Observations of Prefectures (統計でみる都道府県のすがた, Tōkei de Miru Todōfuken no Sugata), as well as reports of the censuses and surveys the SBJ conducted. It has also edited books on the SBJ's history and historical documents related to official statistics.

== See also ==
- Government of Japan – Ministries of Japan
- Government of Meiji Japan
- Postwar Japan
- Demographics of Japan
- Economy of Japan
- Japan Statistical Society
