= Personal Property Securities Register =

Electronic register in New Zealand and Australia

Agency overview
- Jurisdiction: New Zealand (and Australia in May 2011)
- Parent agency: New Zealand Ministry of Economic Development; Australian Financial Security Authority
- Website: ppsr.govt.nz ppsr.gov.au

The Personal Property Securities Register (PPSR) is an electronic register that allows security interests in personal property to be registered and searched in accordance with the New Zealand Personal Property Securities Act 1999 (the Act) and the Australian Personal Property Securities Act 2009.

The New Zealand PPSR is maintained by the New Zealand Companies Office, an agency of the Ministry of Business, Innovation and Employment. The Australian Financial Security Authority (AFSA) is the Australian Government agency responsible for administering the Australian PPS Register.

== Electronic register ==
The New Zealand PPSR is a wholly electronic register available to the public 24 hours a day, 365 days a year. It provides online searching, registration and maintenance of financing statements. The Australian PPS Register commenced operation on 30 January 2012.

== History ==
The Act reformed the law relating to security interests in personal property and established the PPSR. The PPSR became operational on 1 May 2002. It replaced a number of existing registers including the Chattels Register, Motor Vehicle Securities Register and the Register of Company Charges.

In December 2009, the Australian Personal Property Securities Act 2009 ("the PPS Act") was passed. The Australian PPS Act establishes the Personal Property Securities Register ("the PPS Register"). The Australian PPSR became operational on 30 January 2012. It replaced a number of existing registers including the Australian Shipping Register, New South Wales Register of Encumbered Vehicles, Queensland Register of Encumbered Vehicles, South Australian Vehicle Securities Register, Tasmanian Motor Vehicle Securities Register, Vic Roads Vehicle Securities Register, and Western Australian Register of Encumbered Vehicles.

== Activities ==
The PPSR is used by both secured parties (creditors) and consumers.

=== Registration ===
Registering a security interest on the PPSR may give creditors a better chance of recovering a debt if a debtor defaults.

The Act contains rules for determining priority between security interests in the same collateral (see section 66 of the Act). If a creditor does not register a security interest and a debtor is adjudicated bankrupt or is placed into liquidation, secured creditors will be prioritised when payments are made or assets distributed.

=== Searching ===
The PPSR can be used to assess the level of risk that a debtor may represent to a creditor. Before entering into a contractual relationship with a debtor, a creditor may search the PPSR to check whether they may pose a risk.

It possible for potential creditors to:

- Search a debtor to determine whether there are any existing security interests over their collateral, this may mean they have a number of existing debts.
- Search a debtor to identify if the piece of collateral they are offering you as security has been used as security for another party and if so, someone else will have priority over this collateral.
- Search collateral on the PPSR before buying an item. Check to see if the item is encumbered with an existing registered security. If you are purchasing a car, you may search on the VIN. Alternatively, conduct a debtor search (against the seller of the goods).

Consumers may also search the PPSR before buying an item of personal property to check that there is no money owing. This is particularly important if purchasing a second hand car privately – it is possible to search the PPSR using the VIN (Vehicle Identification Number) to check whether there may be money owed (registered security interests) on the vehicle. The PPSR also correlates information from the NEVDIS (National Exchange of Vehicle and Driver Information System) database to provide write-off history and stolen vehicle data in the form of a PPSR certificate, which can be issued upon successful completion of a serial number (VIN) search.

== The New Zealand Companies Office ==
As well as the PPSR, the New Zealand Companies Office is also responsible for the administration of the following registers:

- The New Zealand companies register and the Overseas companies register. These are electronic registers that provide the online searching, incorporation and maintenance services for New Zealand registered companies and overseas companies registered to carry on business in New Zealand.
- The Incorporated Societies Register (including charitable trusts).
- The Motor Vehicle Traders Register (MVTR) – an electronic register that contains information on all registered motor vehicle traders, and information about the trader's business, including its physical address.

=== International activities and involvement ===
The New Zealand Companies Office is a founding member of the Corporate Registers Forum (an international association of corporate registries) and is an International member of the International Association of Commercial Administrators (IACA).
