= YTJ =

YTJ may refer to:

- Business Information System (government service) (Finnish: Yritys- ja yhteisötietojärjestelmä, YTJ)
- Terrace Bay Airport, Ontario, Canada, IATA airport code YTJ
