= Central Business Register =

- Det Centrale Virksomhedsregister
- (Danish Realm)

Agency overview
- Jurisdiction: Denmark; Greenland
- Headquarters: Langelinie Allé 17 DK-2100, Copenhagen Ø 55.6974420°N 12.5996760°E
- Parent agency: Danish Business Authority
- Website: datacvr.virk.dk

The Central Business Register (a.k.a. CVR — Danish: Det Centrale Virksomhedsregister, Greenlandic: Qitiusumik Suliffeqarfinnik Nalunaarsuiffik) is the central government register containing primary data on all businesses in Denmark (in Greenland with the effect from 1 January 2018), regardless of economic and organizational structure, except personally owned companies with an annual turnover of less than 50,000 Danish kroner.

== Information provided ==
The CVR contains detailed information on all Danish and Greenlandic limited companies, including fiscal reports, management information, beneficial owners and status.

=== Optional protection from solicitation ===
Entities that opt not to receive advertising inquiries, including unsolicited emails and canvassing, are identified as "Reklamebeskyttelse: Dette P-nummer/CVR-nummer er reklamebeskyttet," which translates to "Advertising Protection: This P-number/CVR-number is advertising protected."

Advertisers are required to identify themselves in such a way that is easily recognizable and accessible by the recipient. The name and address of the advertiser must be stated in the offer. Recipient of advertisements who state in writing that they do not want to receive advertising, the advertiser must abide, unconditionally, post haste, but no later than 3 months of receipt of the request.

=== Types of Danish entities ===
Types of businesses, or organizational structure, include public limited liability companies, limited liability companies, partnerships, sole proprietorships, non-profit entities, and municipal entities.

=== Information provided and access ===
All CVR entities have a tax ID, a number equivalent to the Social Security number of Danes and Greenlanders. Other information provided includes (i) entity legal structure, (ii) production (called "P-units"). For certain types of entities, including limited liabilities, the CVR provides financial information, mission information, company filings, information about management, and corporate governance. No payment is required for information on company registration numbers, registered offices or trade names.

== See also ==
- List of company registers
