= Australian Financial Security Authority =

Agency overview
- Formed: 1999
- Preceding agency: Insolvency & Trustee Service Australia
- Jurisdiction: Government of Australia
- Headquarters: Barton, Canberra, Australian Capital Territory
- Agency executive: Chief Executive
- Parent department: Department of the Treasury (Australia)
- Website: www.afsa.gov.au

The Australian Financial Security Authority (AFSA) is an executive agency within the Treasury portfolio of the Government of Australia. AFSA administers the application of bankruptcy laws and the Personal Property Securities Register (PPSR) in Australia.

== History ==
The agency was formed in 1999 with the passing of the Public Service Act 1999, succeeding Insolvency & Trustee Service Australia.

== Personal insolvency ==
AFSA undertakes several statutory roles established under the Bankruptcy Act 1966.

=== Inspector-General in Bankruptcy ===
The Chief Executive of AFSA is also appointed as the Inspector-General in Bankruptcy. The Inspector-General is responsible for the general administration of the Bankruptcy Act, including regulating bankruptcy trustees and debt agreement administrators, reviewing trustee decisions, and investigating alleged offences under the Act.

=== Official Receiver ===
AFSA operates the public bankruptcy and personal insolvency registry service on behalf of the Official Receiver. The Official Receiver exercises coercive powers to assist bankruptcy trustees, oversees the bankruptcy process from assessment to discharge, and maintains the National Personal Insolvency Index (NPII), a publicly available electronic record of certain personal insolvency proceedings in Australia.

=== Official Trustee in Bankruptcy ===
The Official Trustee in Bankruptcy is a body corporate created under the Bankruptcy Act. It administers bankruptcies and personal insolvency arrangements where it is in the public interest or where it is not commercially viable for a private trustee to do so. The Official Trustee also manages the custody, control, and realisation of assets under various proceeds of crime and criminal matters legislation, including the Proceeds of Crime Act 2002 and the Mutual Assistance in Criminal Matters Act 1987.

== Personal property securities ==
AFSA also fulfils a statutory role under the Personal Property Securities Act 2009 (PPS Act).

=== Registrar of Personal Property Securities ===
The Registrar of Personal Property Securities is responsible for maintaining the PPSR in compliance with the PPS Act and related regulations. The Registrar’s functions include ensuring the PPSR is accessible and effective, refusing or granting access, removing or reinstating data, conducting investigations, and taking enforcement action where appropriate.
