= Registrar General's Department =

The Registrar General's Department is the Government of Ghana agency responsible for the registration of companies and business in Ghana.

== History ==
The department was set up under the Ordinance in 1950. Ghana was still a colony of the British Empire when the department was created. In 1961, it became a department of the Ministry of Justice in 1961.

== See also ==
- List of company registers
