= Companies Office =

NZ government agency

Agency overview
- Jurisdiction: New Zealand
- Parent agency: Ministry of Business, Innovation and Employment
- Website: www.companiesoffice.govt.nz

The Companies Office is a New Zealand government agency that provides business registry services for corporate entities, personal property and capital market securities. It delivers nearly all its services through electronic systems and the internet. It is a service of the Ministry of Business, Innovation and Employment.

== Activities ==
Companies Office registers relate to companies, personal property securities, superannuation funds, incorporated societies, building societies, charitable trusts, unit trusts, friendly societies and credit unions. The office has compliance, prosecution and enforcement functions under statutes such as the Companies Act, Securities Act, Corporations (Investigation and Management) Act 1989 and Financial Reporting Act.

The office is a founding member of the Corporate Registers Forum (an international association of corporate registries) and is an International member of the International Association of Commercial Administrators (IACA).

== Companies Register ==
The Companies Register website includes an electronic register available to the public 24 hours a day, 7 days a week. It provides the online searching, incorporation and maintenance services for New Zealand registered companies and other body corporates. The register is free, making the office one of the most transparent in the world.

The site went live in 1996 and was the first government corporate registry in the world to allow access over the Internet to statutory corporate information. In 1999 the Companies Office was the first in the world to allow the incorporation of companies over the Internet.

== Other registers ==
The Companies Office also administers numerous other registers, including the following.

- Disclose Register – a register for offers of financial products and managed investment schemes under the Financial Markets Conduct Act 2013
- Financial Service Providers Register – as required under the Financial Services Providers (Registration & Dispute Resolution) Act 2008
- Personal Property Securities Register – a fully electronic register where information about security interests in personal property are recorded and searched. It is available to the public 24 hours a day, 7 days a week.

== See also ==
- List of official business registers
