= Vanuatu Financial Services Commission =

Financial non-banking regulator of Vanuatu

Agency overview
- Formed: 20 December 1993
- Preceding agency: Ministry of Finance and Economic Management
- Jurisdiction: Vanuatu
- Headquarters: Companies House, PMB 9023, Rue Bougainville, Port Vila
- Agency executives: George Andrews, Commissioner; Moli Vanaos Goiset Thi Tam, Chair
- Key document: Vanuatu Financial Services Commission Act No. 35 of 1993
- Website: vfsc.vu

Vanuatu Financial Services Commission (VFSC) is the financial regulatory authority of Vanuatu. It was created by the Vanuatu Financial Services Commission Act No. 35 of 1993 when it assumed a part of the responsibilities of the Ministry of Finance and Economic Management. The VFSC regulates non-banking financial services in the country.

== History ==
The Vanuatu Financial Services Commission was established in 1993 as a successor to the Ministry of Finance and Economic Management, established following the country had achieved its independence from the United Kingdom and France in 1980.

After Vanuatu had been greylisted by the Financial Action Task Force (FATF) in February 2016, the VFSC, along with the Financial Investigation Unit and the Reserve Bank of Vanuatu, worked to implement the FATF's action plan, leading to the delisting of Vanuatu in June 2018.

In March 2019, the Vanuatu Financial Services Commission tightened regulations, forbidding its license holders to deal in cryptocurrencies. However, in July 2021, the regulator introduced a separate license for dealing in cryptocurrency assets.

== Powers ==
The main role of the VFSC is to administer the registry of companies. It also has the powers to regulate, monitor, and supervise the non-banking financial sector of Vanuatu, protecting the public from loss and fraud, promoting Vanuatu as an international jurisdiction, and enforcing compliance. The Commission assists and advises the government on policies and regulation.
