= Corporate Registers Forum =

Corporate Registers Forum Logo

The Corporate Registers Forum is an association grouping the corporate registries among the countries of the Commonwealth of Nations.

The membership is open to government agencies and their officials responsible for the administration of body corporate registers (a register of companies for example).

The associations' aim is to provide members with the opportunity to review the latest developments in corporate business registers internationally and exchange experiences and information on the present and future operation of corporate business registration systems. The focus of the initial meetings was in the Asia-Pacific region.

The forum first met in Auckland in 2003 and was hosted by the New Zealand Companies Office. The 2003 meeting was an opportunity for corporate registries from thirteen jurisdictions to meet. The initial name given to this group was the Asia-Pacific Corporate Registries Forum.

A second meeting was hosted by the Australian Securities and Investments Commission and held in Melbourne, Australia in March 2005. The members present at that meeting voted to adopt the name Corporate Registers Forum.

A third meeting was hosted by the Hong Kong Companies Registry held in Hong Kong in 2006 and it was agreed that the Corporate Registers Forum would be registered under the Hong Kong Business Ordinance as an unincorporated entity.

The fourth meeting was held in April 2007. This meeting was jointly hosted by the Companies Commission of Malaysia and the Accounting & Corporate Regulatory Authority of Singapore.

A fifth meeting was held in April 2008 and was hosted by Corporations Canada in Vancouver.

The sixth meeting was held in 2009 Cape Town, South Africa and was hosted by the Companies and Intellectual Property Registration Office of South Africa (CIPRO).

The seventh meeting was held in 2010 in Port Louis, Mauritius and was hosted by the Companies Division of the Ministry of Finance and Economic Empowerment.

The eighth meeting of the CRF was held in Singapore in 2011 and was hosted by the Accounting and Corporate Regulatory Authority of Singapore.

The ninth meeting of was held in New Delhi India and was hosted by The 2012 Corporate Registers Forum conference was hosted by the Minister of Corporate Affairs, India.

The 10th anniversary meeting of the Corporate Registers Forum was held in Auckland New Zealand and hosted by the New Zealand Companies Office.

The 11th meeting of the CRF was held in Rio de Janeiro Brazil and hosted by Junta Comercial do Estado do Rio de Janeiro (the Rio de Janeiro Trade Board) of Brazil.

== Members of the Corporate Registers Forum ==
| Country | Agency |
|---|---|
| Australia | Australian Securities and Investments Commission |
| Bermuda | Bermuda Registrar of Companies |
| Botswana | Ministry of Trade and Industry |
| Canada | Corporations Canada |
| Hong Kong | Companies Registry |
| Malaysia | Companies Commission of Malaysia (Suruhanjaya Syarikat Malaysia) |
| Mauritius | Companies Division, Ministry Of Finance and Economic Development |
| New Zealand | Companies Office |
| Nigeria | Corporate Affairs Commission |
| Samoa | Samoa International Finance Authority |
| Pakistan | Securities and Exchange Commission of Pakistan |
| Singapore | Accounting and Corporate Regulatory Authority |
| South Africa | Companies and Intellectual Property Commission |
| United Kingdom | Companies House |
| Vanuatu | Vanuatu Financial Services Commission |
| Zambia | Patents and Companies Registration Agency |

== See also ==
- List of company registers
- OpenCorporates
- European Business Register Network
