= Business Information System (government service) =

Finnish government service

The Business Information System (BIS; Finnish: Yritys- ja yhteisötietojärjestelmä, YTJ) is a Finnish government service jointly maintained by the Finnish Patent and Registration Office (PRH) and the Finnish Tax Administration providing an access to the Finnish Trade Register and the Finnish Register of Foundations and an ability to file information for both agencies. The name is an abbreviation of the Finnish full name Yritys- ja yhteisötietojärjestelmä.

Searching companies in the Finnish Trade Register can be made with the name of the company or the Business ID (Finnish: Y-tunnus, Swedish: FO-nummer). The BIS database does not include the Finnish Register of Associations.
