= Company register =

Government record of businesses

A company register is a register of business organizations such as companies in the jurisdiction they operate under. Registration is normally mandated by the government of that jurisdiction.

A company register serves a purpose of protection, accountability and control. In contrast many countries also operate a statistical business register which has a different purpose and plays a central part in a system of official economic statistics at a national statistics office.

== Company registers by country ==
Each country's company register has different registrar types, contents, purpose, and public availability. They typically contain the name, the owners and key personal of an organisation as well as regular updates as mandated by the government of that jurisdiction, to provide information to stakeholders and the general public. Information has to be maintained by the organization that is registered through regular filings which are typically done when changes occur and at least annually.

== Openness ==
According to ratings published in 2016 by the website OpenCorporates, Denmark and United Kingdom are the leaders with regard to openness of information available in a company's register. Registries/registrars in these countries are named, correspondingly, Central Business Register and Companies House.

Openness has improved generally in recent decade. According to ratings published in 2026 by the website OpenRegistry, United Kingdom, Ireland and Australia are among the countries that have company profile, directors, shareholders and filings available to the public. All these information is free in the United Kingdom while most of the information is charged with a fee in Australia. Companies House also provides APIs to the public for information access.

== See also ==
- List of official business registers
- Corporate Registers Forum
- Registered office
- Administrative address
- Mass registration address
