= Civil Aviation Authority (Poland) =

Government agency that regulates of aviation

- Urząd Lotnictwa Cywilnego; UWL
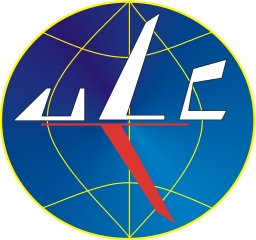

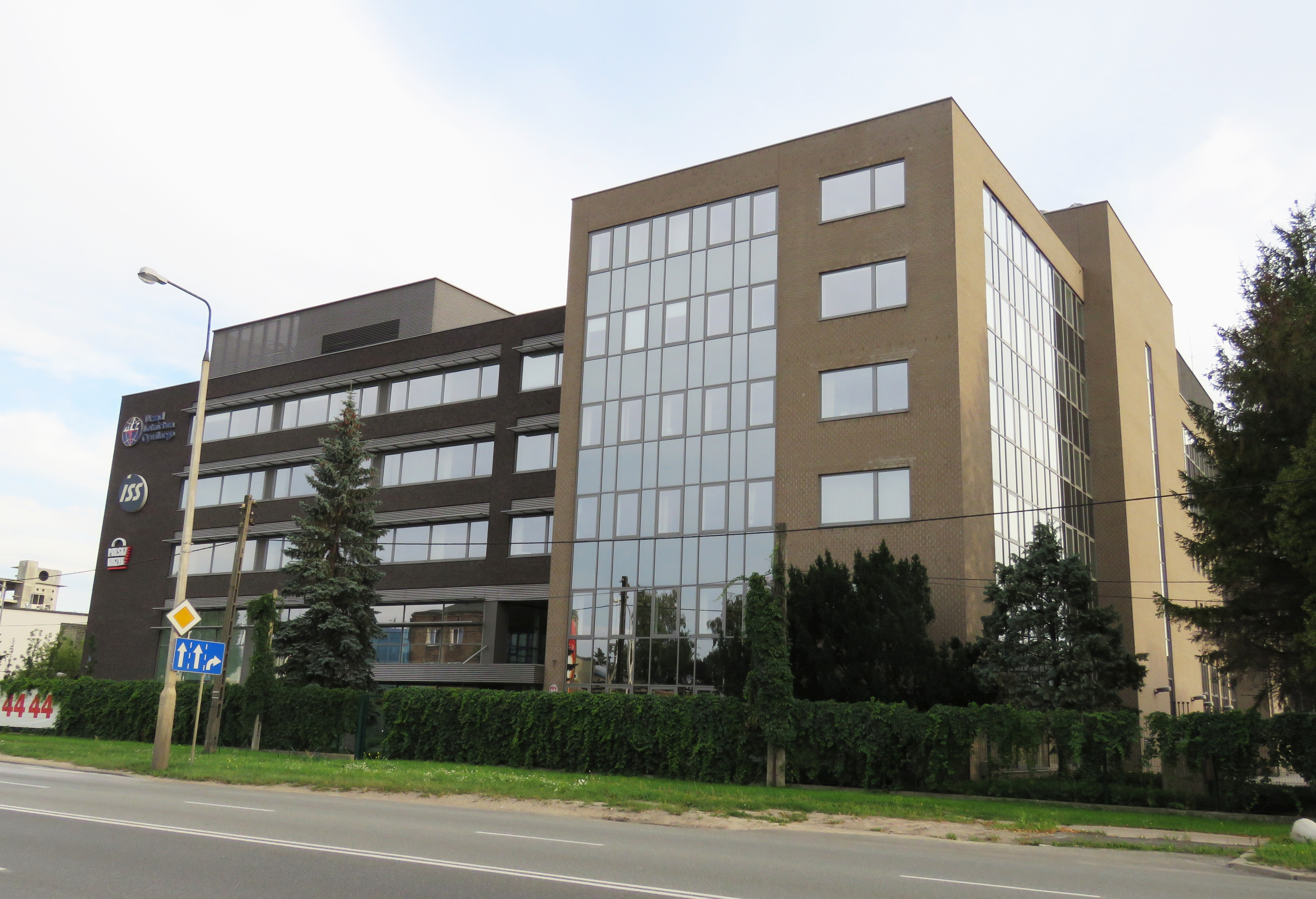

Agency overview
- Formed: 2002; 24 years ago
- Jurisdiction: Poland
- Headquarters: Warsaw
- Employees: 367
- Website: www.ulc.gov.pl/pl/

The Civil Aviation Authority (CAA) of the Republic of Poland (Polish: Urząd Lotnictwa Cywilnego, ULC), as a civil aviation authority, is an agency of the Polish government under the Ministry of Infrastructure and Development responsible for implementing policies on civil aviation to assure safe, economic and efficient air travel. The Civil Aviation Authority is responsible for providing and maintaining safe and efficient aviation services to, from and within Poland. The president of the CAA performs functions of aviation administration and aviation supervision authority in the following areas among others:

- compliance with legal provisions relating to the civil aviation and commercial aviation,
- operation of aircraft and certification of entities conducting activity in civil aviation,
- airworthiness of aeronautical equipment and the competency of the flight personnel,
- registers of: aircraft, aerodromes, aviation ground facilities, flight personnel, and landing areas,
- co-operation with the authorities to which the state aviation is subordinated and with other organisational units in air traffic management and in ensuring air traffic safety and services,
- co-operation with the aviation administration and supervision authorities of foreign states, local government authorities in matters related to civil aviation, ICAO and other international civil aviation organisations,
- flight safety in civil aviation, including the examination and evaluation of safety levels in civil aviation,
- application of civil aviation regulations,
- approving the boundaries of manoeuvring area of the aerodrome,
- international agreements - preparation and negotiations, legislative acts in civil aviation
- National Civil Aviation Security Programme and National Civil Aviation Facilitation Programme – designing and direct supervision over its implementation,
- aerodrome security protection programs and security protection programs provided by entities conducting commercial activities in civil aviation and supervising implementation of such programs,
- organisation of aviation medical examination services,
- co-ordination of local town and country plans in municipalities where a new aerodrome location is projected or an existing aerodrome and ground aviation facilities are to be modernised.
- protect a passengers’ right

The president of the CAA may authorise other authorities or specialised organisational units or persons having the relevant licences or certificates of competency entitling holder to exercise the privilege to perform certain supervision or control operations. (art. 22 par 3 of the Aviation Act adopted on July 3, 2002, and published on August 16, 2002 (Journal of Laws No 130 pos. 1112)
