= OpenCorporates =

Database on corporate entities

- Website type: Public records database
- Available in: English
- Owner: OpenCorporates Ltd
- Website: opencorporates.com
- Registration: Optional (Note: Not required for all features, but required for certain information, such as directors and incorporation data)
- Launched: 20 December 2010; 15 years ago
- Current status: Active
- Content license: Open Database Licence

OpenCorporates is a website that shares data on corporations under the copyleft Open Database License. The company, OpenCorporates Ltd, (Note: Known as Chrinon Ltd until 2018) was incorporated on 18 December 2010 by Chris Taggart and Rob McKinnon, and the website was officially launched on 20th.

Data is sourced from national business registries in 140 jurisdictions, and presented in a standardised form. Collected data comprises the name of the entity, date of incorporation, registered addresses, and the names of directors. Some data, such as the ownership structure, is contributed by users.

== Recognition ==
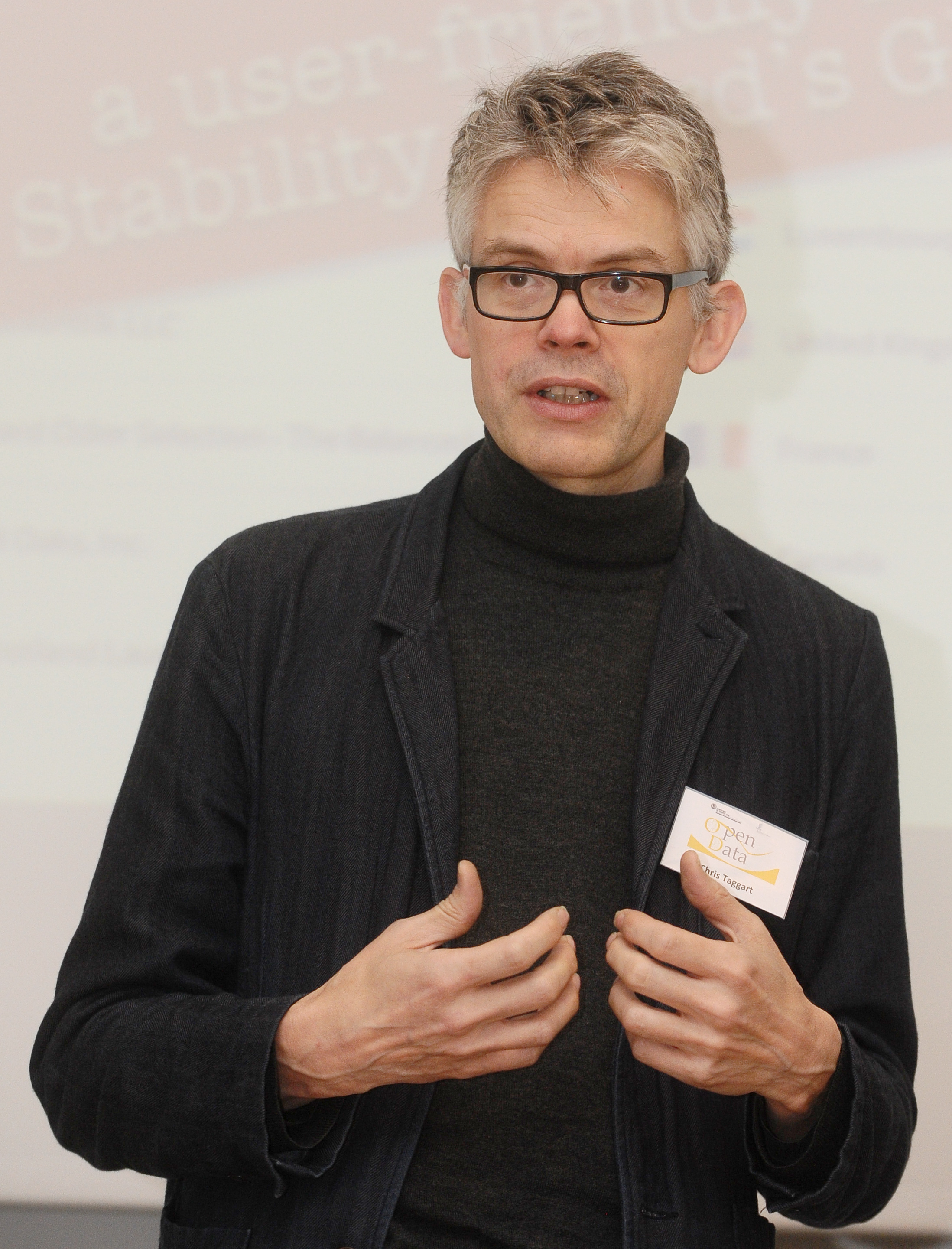
Co-founder Chris Taggart

In 2011, the site won third place in the Open Data Challenge. Vice President of the European Commission Neelie Kroes said the site "is the kind of resource the (Digital) Single Market needs and it is encouraging to see that it is being built." The project was represented on the European Union's Core Vocabularies Working Group's Core Business Task Force.

In early 2012, the project was appointed to the Financial Stability Board's advisory panel on a Legal Entity Identification for Financial Contracts.

In July 2015, OpenCorporates was a finalist in both the Business and Publisher categories at the Open Data Institute Awards. It was announced as the winner of the Open Data Business Award due to work with promoting data transparency in the corporate sector.

== Usage ==
The service has been used to study public procurement data, online hiring market, to visualize and analyze company data, to analyze tax havens, and illicit activities of companies.

== See also ==
- Corporate Registers Forum
- European business register
- List of company registers
