= European Business Register Network =

European network of trade registers

The European Business Register Network (EBR Network) was a European network of trade registers kept by the registration authorities of several European countries. It was managed by the European Business Registry Association.

Many scams circulate offered inclusion in the European Business register against payment of a hidden fee, these did not refer to the official register though. Inclusion in the European Business Register was free of charge and automatically done by registering a company within one of the partnering countries.

The network was closed in March of 2026, as a result of changes to the European register landscape and competing technologies and API-driven infrastructure.

== History ==
The EBR was developed in 1996 as a part of the fully integrated approach of the European Commission in the legislation designed to achieve regulations to promote transparent financial markets and to facilitate free movement of companies.

The EBR served as a starting point of the Business Register Interoperability Throughout Europe (BRITE) project which developed an interoperability solution (BRIS) for Business Registers to interact across the European Union. BRIS made it possible to obtain comparable, official company information from the countries connected to the network.

== Members ==
At its peak the EBR Network was composed of 27 partners.

Amongst others the European Business registers contained information about:

- Legal name of a company
- Registered office
- People representing the company (Managing Director, Board of Directors, holders of Proxy)
- Subscribed capital if any

Partners of the EBR network
Austria	Company profiles and appointments
Estonia	Company profiles and appointments
Finland	Company profiles and appointments
France	Company profiles and appointments
Germany	Company profiles and appointments
Gibraltar	Company profiles
Guernsey	Company profiles
Italy	Company profiles and appointments
Jersey	Company profiles
Latvia	Company profiles and appointments
Lithuania	Company profiles
Luxembourg	Company profiles and appointments
North Macedonia	Company profiles and appointments
Malta	Company profiles
Slovenia	Company profiles
Spain	Company profiles and appointments

== See also ==
- List of company registers
- OpenCorporates
