= Business Register System =

Business Register System (German: Unternehmensregister, abbreviated URS) is a statistical business register in Germany which provides structural data about economic sectors and serves as the essential source of information about entities which is needed for planning, preparation and implementation of statistical surveys.

== Legal basis ==
Business Register System 95 (URS 95) operates according to EU EEC Regulation No. 2186/93 on Community coordination in drawing up business registers for statistical purposes.

URS also has a national legal basis: Statistical Register Law – StatRegG of 16 June 1998.

A newer register system operated according to the newer version of regulation No. 177/2008. This regulation established a common framework for business registers for statistical purposes. Regulation No. 177/2008 was replaced in 2020, leading to changes to the economic system. The regulation standardized the practice of statistical business registration throughout the EU, leading to changes to the URS to comply to it. The regulation was replaced with many smaller framework regulations that did similar things but made the system more flexible, allowing it to adapt. One of these regulations was Commission Implementing Regulation (EU) 2019/2153.
