= Statistical business register =

A statistical business register (SBR) plays a central part in a system of official economic statistics at a national statistics office.

In comparison, a company register has different purposes: protection, accountability, and control of legal entities.

== Register contents ==
=== Data sources ===
Countries use whatever data sources they seem relevant: e.g. they often integrate a company register in one form or another.

=== Type of business units ===
In EU a corresponding regulation defines register contents:

- all enterprises carrying on economic activities contributing to the gross domestic product (GDP), and their local units
- the legal units of which those enterprises consist
- enterprise groups

=== List of details recorded ===
- identification properties
  - identification number
  - name
  - address
  - contact info
  - VAT number
- dates of creation/liquidation
- main activity
- operational status
- legal form
- links to other registries
- links to other organizations or structural units
- control
- ownership
- employees

== Business registries in the world ==
United Nations Economic Commission for Europe provides Guidelines on Statistical Business Registers which describes the roles of the statistical business register.

European Commission provides a legal framework for business registers for statistical purposes.

See: List of company, tax and statistical business registers
