= List of companies of Suriname =

Location of Suriname

The economy of Suriname largely depends on agriculture, petroleum, and mining. In 2018, the three biggest main export partners of Suriname were Switzerland, Hong Kong, and the United Arab Emirates, and in 2021, the three biggest main import partners of Suriname were the United States, China and the Netherlands.

== Notable firms ==
This list includes notable companies with primary headquarters located in the country. The industry and sector follow the Industry Classification Benchmark taxonomy. Organizations that have ceased operations are included and noted as defunct.

Notable companies Status: P=Private, S=State; A=Active, D=Defunct
Name	Industry	Sector	Headquarters	Founded	Notes	Status	
Ampie's Broadcasting Corporation	Media	Radio and TV Broadcasters	Paramaribo	1975	Broadcasts at a frequency of 101.7 MHz	P	A
Apintie	Media	Radio and TV Broadcasters	Paramaribo	1958	Broadcasts at frequency of 91.7 MHz and 97.1 MHz	P	A
Blue Wing Airlines	Consumer services	Airlines	Paramaribo	2002	Banned from European airspace due to safety violations	P	A
Caricom Airways	Consumer services	Airlines	Paramaribo	2004	Defunct 2018	P	D
Central Bank of Suriname	Financials	Banks	Paramaribo	1957	Reserve bank of Suriname	S	A
De Surinaamsche Bank	Financials	Banks	Paramaribo	1865	The largest bank in Suriname	P	A
Fernandes Group	Conglomerates	Holding	Paramaribo	1939	Wood, Soft drinks, bakery, soap	P	A
Fly All Ways	Consumer services	Airlines	Paramaribo	2014	International airline	P	A
Surinam Airways	Consumer services	Airlines	Paramaribo	1953	Flag carrier of Suriname	S	A
Telesur	Telecommunications	Telecommunication service providers	Paramaribo	1945	Mobile telecommunication service	S	A

== See also ==
- Suriname Stock Exchange
