= Dewnarain Poetoe =

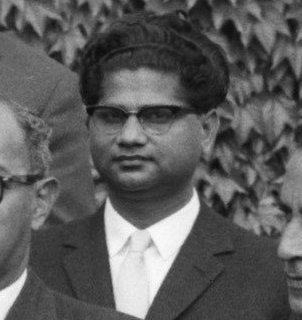
Poetoe (circa 1961)

Dewnarain Poetoe (1923/24 – 14 December 2012) was a member of the Estates of Suriname during the 1950s and 1960s.

Poetoe was born in either 1923 or 1924, and worked as a cashier at a branch of De Surinaamsche Bank in the Nickerie District. On New Year's Eve in 1954 there was a report of a burglary at that branch. It soon became apparent that there was a staged break-in in an attempt to cover up long-standing fraud. Poetoe was identified as the prime suspect and he was arrested. He made a partial confession and in May 1958 he was sentenced to 3.5 years in prison, less 1.5 years in pre-trial detention.

At the election a month later, Poetoe was elected as a member of the Estates of Suriname in the Nickerie district as a NOP candidate. The other NOP candidat, Jan Kolhoe, was also elected at the same district. Poetoe was a member of parliament for some time until he was sentenced on appeal to three years in prison for his role in the embezzlement of 350,000 Surinamese guilders. After he had served most of that sentence he returned to the parliament at the end of 1959. In 1963 he was re-elected but after that in the year 1967 he did not participate in the elections. In the elections of 1969 he was unsuccessfully an NPS candidate for the district. Later, Poetoe moved to the Netherlands.

Poetoe died on 14 December 2012 in Gouda, the Netherlands, at the age of 88. He was buried in Paramaribo.
