= Adelien Wijnerman =

Surinamese politician and economist

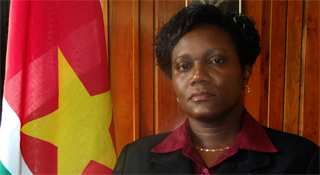

Minister of Finance
- In office 15 June 2011 – 9 October 2013
- President: Dési Bouterse
- Preceded by: Wonnie Boedhoe
- Succeeded by: Andy Rusland

Personal details
- Born: 1964 or 1965 (age 61–62)
- Party: National Democratic Party
- Education: Anton de Kom University of Suriname
- Occupation: Politician; economist

Adeline Wijnerman (born 1964/1965) is a Surinamese politician and economist who was Minister of Finance from 2011 until 2013.

== Biography ==
Adeline Wijnerman was born in 1964 or 1965. She studied econometrics as a student assistant at the Anton de Kom University of Suriname Institute for Social Scientific Research. She worked as a civil servant in the Ministry of Finance, including as head of treasury inspection and head of the tax directorate's planning finance and control department. She became the country's director of the Ministry of Finance in the mid-2000s.

At one point, she joined the National Democratic Party. In 2011, she was appointed as the Minister of Finance in the first Bouterse cabinet, Her appointment had come following the resignation of Wonnie Boedhoe amidst reports of disagreements within the government involving Boedhoe. She was sworn in at the Presidential Palace of Suriname on 15 June.

By July 2013, she was in disagreement with Governor of the Central Bank of Suriname Gillmore Hoefdraad over government spending, including project expenses and minister salaries. She was losing support among the NDP, and she was reportedly being considered for replacement. Despite this, it was announced on 31 July that she would remain Minister. On 9 October 2013, she was dismissed as finance minister amidst a destabilization of the government's coalition. She was criticized by De Ware Tijd for the lack of financial transparency in the government. She was succeeded by Andy Rusland.

She has also worked as an accounting lecturer.
