= Economy of Suriname =

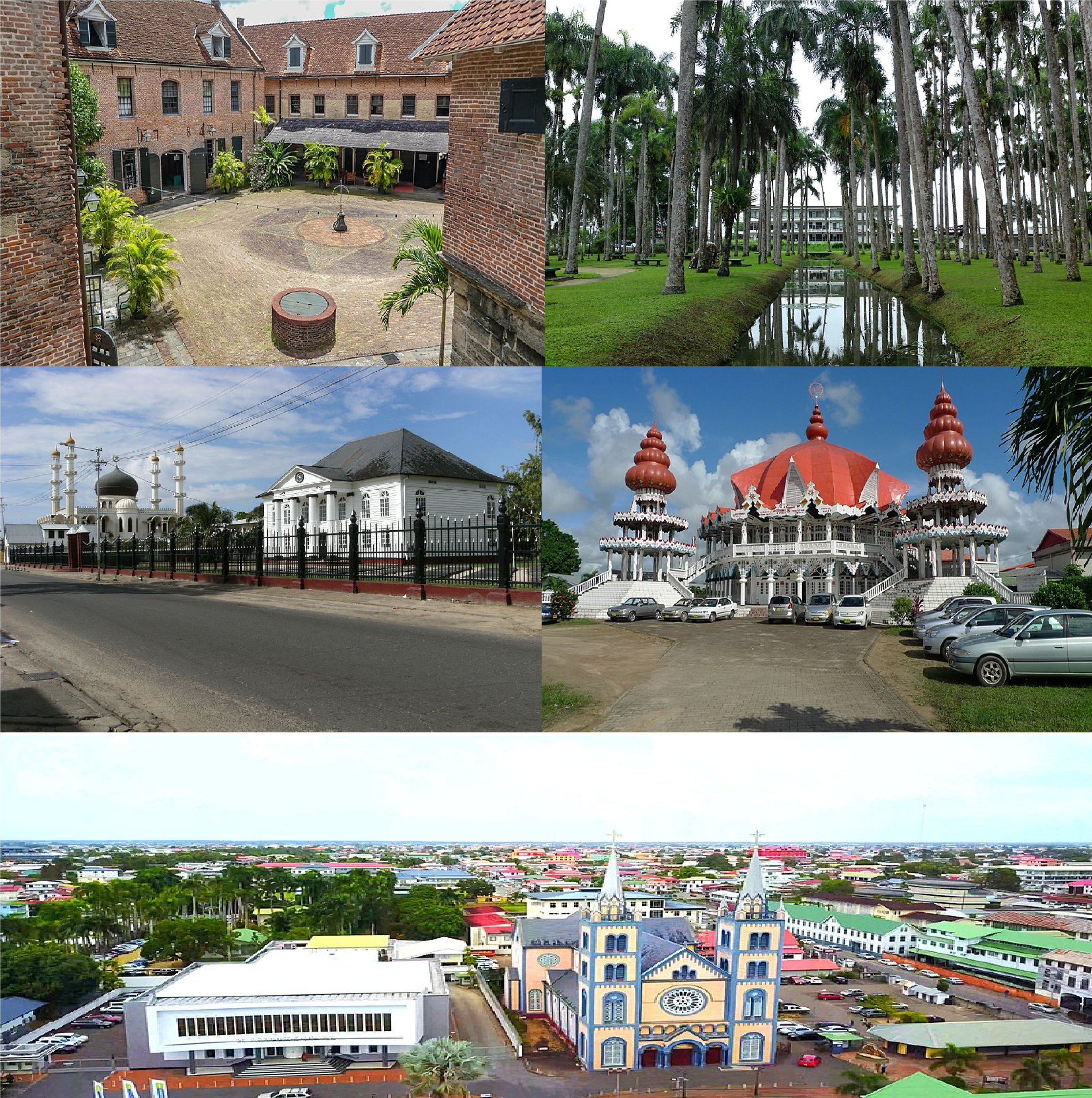
- Paramaribo, the capital of Suriname
- Currency: Surinamese dollar (SRD) (since 2004); Surinamese guilder (SRG) (until 2003)
- Fiscal year: Calendar year
- Trade organisations: WTO, CARICOM, Unasur, Mercosur (associate)

Statistics
- Population: ▲628,886 (2023)
- GDP: ▲$4.51 billion (nominal; 2025); ▲$14.74 billion (PPP; 2025)
- GDP rank: 162nd (nominal; 2025); 159th (PPP; 2025)
- GDP growth: 3.0% (2024); 3.2% (2025)
- GDP per capita: ▲$6,860 (nominal; 2025); ▲$22,440 (PPP; 2025)
- GDP per capita rank: 101st (nominal; 2025); 84th (PPP; 2025)
- GDP per capita growth: 0.9% (2025)
- GDP by sector: agriculture: 10.4%; industry: 36.6%; services: 52.9% (2012 est.)
- Inflation (CPI): 22% (2020)
- Population below national poverty line: 70% (2002 est.)
- Human Development Index: ▲0.724 high (2018) (98th); 0.557 IHDI (2018)
- Labour force: 220,600 (2020)
- Labour force by occupation: agriculture: 8%; industry: 14%; services: 78% (2004)
- Unemployment: 7.47% (2020)
- Main industries: bauxite and gold mining, alumina production; oil, lumbering, food processing, fishing

External
- Exports: ▼$1.92 billion (2024)
- Export goods: Gold, alumina, Wood, crude oil, lumber, shrimp and fish, rice, bananas
- Main export partners: Switzerland: 68.75%; Guyana: 8.64%; United States: 6.41%; China: 2.74%; Canada: 1.92%; France: 1.87%; India: 1.79%; Netherlands: 1.14%; United Arab Emirates: 0.68%; Malaysia: 0.61%; (2024)
- Imports: ▼$1.93 billion (2024)
- Import goods: capital equipment, petroleum, foodstuffs, cotton, consumer goods
- Main import partners: United States: 20.51%; China: 15.34%; Netherlands: 11.80%; Trinidad and Tobago: 5.16%; Japan: 3.37%; Antigua and Barbuda: 3.43%; Brazil: 3.29%; Germany: 3.17%; Turkey: 2.34%; India: 2.18%; (2024)
- Gross external debt: $504.3 million (2005 est.)

Public finance
- Foreign reserves: $647.3 million (2019)
- Revenue: $826.6 million (2010 est.)
- Spending: $939.7 million (2010 est.)
- Economic aid: Netherlands provided $37 million for project and program assistance, European Development Fund $4 million, Belgium $2 million (2003)
- Credit rating: Standard & Poor's:CCC; Outlook: Stable; Moody's: Caa2; Outlook: Stable; Fitch: CCC; Outlook: Highly Vulnerable
- All values, unless otherwise stated, are in US dollars.

The economy of Suriname was largely dependent upon the exports of aluminium oxide and small amounts of aluminium produced from bauxite mined in the country. However, after the departure of Alcoa, the economy depended on the exports of crude oil and gold. Suriname was ranked the 124th safest investment destination in the world in the March 2011 Euromoney Country Risk rankings.

== Agriculture ==
A member of CARICOM, Suriname also exports in small numbers rice, shrimp, timber, bananas, fruits, and vegetables. Fernandes Group is a soft drinks company bottled by Coca-Cola world-wide.

Other agricultural products of Suriname palm kernels, coconuts, peanuts; beef, chickens; forest products; shrimp.

=== Rice ===
In 2018, Suriname produced 273 thousand tons of rice, 125 thousand tons of sugar cane, in addition to smaller productions of other agricultural products, such as banana (48 thousand tons), orange (19 thousand tons) and coconut (14 thousand tons).

=== Hardwood ===
Some big companies are getting the hardwood out of the jungle. However, proposals for exploitation of the country's tropical forests and undeveloped regions of the interior traditionally inhabited by indigenous and Maroon communities have raised the concerns of environmentalists and human rights activists both in Suriname and abroad. These opposing parties are not yet strong in Suriname.

=== Bananas ===
State-owned banana producer Surland closed its doors on April 5, 2002, after its inability to meet payroll expenses for the second month in a row; it is still unclear if Surland will survive this crisis.

The banana producer Surland was remodeled as Stichting Behoud Bananen Sector Suriname (SBBS). The rumour was that because of political differences Surland was manipulated into shutting down. The SBBS had made bananas profitable for the first time in 20 years. There is also wide production of plantains in Suriname.

== Mineral industry ==
The mineral industry of Suriname makes up a large proportion of the country's economy. In 1916, the Aluminium Company of America began mining bauxite in the then Dutch colony of Surinam which over time became Suriname's main export.

Gold and petroleum contributed to nearly 67% of the country’s total exports in 2017. The mining industry accounts for about 85% of exports and 25% of government revenues. Gold mining is controversial due to the impact of Indigenous people.

=== Gold ===
Currently gold exports make up 60-80% of all exports earnings. In 2021 the gold industry accounted for 8.5% of the GDP. The share of large-scale mining in total gold production is 58% compared to 42% of small-scale mining. With an export value of US$1.83 billion in 2023, the gold sector makes an important contribution to the economy.

In early 2025, Suriname's gold industry faced significant scrutiny after revelations of major oversight failures by the Foreign Currency Committee, which monitors gold exports and foreign currency flows. Finance and Planning Minister Stanley Raghoebarsing disclosed that a private plane carrying gold with an official export permit had been intercepted, yet the shipment would yield no state revenue. This incident exposed broader issues, including the issuance of numerous opaque and unjustified export permits, some granted to parties not actively exporting gold. Despite high gold prices and increased mining activity, official gold export figures were abnormally low, and the government estimated a loss of at least US$300 million in recent months. These irregularities contributed to the depreciation of the Surinamese dollar and rising foreign currency prices. The minister pledged to implement stricter oversight and reforms.

=== Bauxite ===
The backbone of Suriname's economy was the export of aluminium oxide (alumina) and small amounts of aluminium produced from bauxite mined in the country. In 1999, the aluminium smelter at Paranam was closed. In November 2015 Suralco ceased the mining of bauxite completely.

== Oil ==
The exploration and exploitation of oil adds substantially to the economy of Suriname at about 10% of the GDP. The national oil company, Staatsolie, is the motor behind Suriname's oil industry. Their core business is oil extraction and refining.

In 2012 Staatsolief produced 16,200 barrels (2,580 m^{3}) a day. Staatsolie currently refines 16,500 barrels a day at Tout Lui Faut refinery in the District of Wanica. Furthermore, they own a 96 MW powerplant and a 189 MW hydro powerplant. They also have their own retail gas stations under their Gow2 brand. They also claim to be a well-established bunker supplier in the Caribbean region.

In 2022 they reported revenue of US$840 million. In that year their contribution to the state treasury was US$320 million. In 2023 they made revenue of US$722 million. The drop in revenue was because of the lower price for oil per barrel that year. Their contribution to the Surinamese state treasury was US$335 million.

Other players in the off-shore oil industry in Suriname are Total Energies, Apache, Shell and Petronas. These companies have signed product sharing contracts with Staatsolie for the exploration and extraction of off-shore oil. The first of these contracts was signed in 2015. In 2023 they signed three more of such contracts.

In 2020 the first off-shore oil was found. Currently Staatsolie, local partners and Surinamese companies, as well as the Surinamese government are actively anticipating on the development of the off-shore oil industry. The first production will start with the development of oil block 58 in 2028 in which Staatsolie has a share of 20%. It's projected that Suriname will make around US$7 billion in the first five production years. Staatsolie and other local players are anticipating on the development of the off-shore oil industry.

== Stock exchange ==
The Suriname Stock Exchange (SSX) is the stock exchange of Suriname. The exchange was established in 1994 by the Association for Securities Trading in Suriname (VvES), founded on January 1, 1994. Stock trading does not occur daily but twice a month on the first and third Thursday. There are twelve companies listed on the exchange.

=== Major events ===
In April 2025, Suriname experienced a significant rise in the price of the euro, which reached SRD 41.33. Finance and Planning Minister Stanley Raghoebarsing attributed the increase to international developments, particularly the weakening of the U.S. dollar following new American trade policies. On 3 April 2025, U.S. President Donald Trump announced a 10% tariff on all imports and higher rates on goods from around 60 economies. These measures, analysts noted, could trigger global economic disruptions. Raghoebarsing emphasized that the euro surge was not due to domestic policy and urged the public not to panic.

== Currency ==
Moreover, in January 2002, the government renegotiated civil servant wages (a significant part of the work force and a significant portion of government expenditure), agreeing to raises as high as 100%. Pending implementation of these wage increases and concerned that the government may be unable to meet these increased expenses, the local currency weakened from Sf 2200 in January 2002 to nearly Sf 2500 in April 2002. On March 26, 2003, the Central Bank of Suriname (CBvS) adjusted the exchange rate of the U.S. dollar. This action resulted in further devaluation of the Surinamese guilder. The official exchange rate of the US$ was SF 2,650 for selling and SF 2,600 for purchasing. With the official exchange rate, the CBvS came closer to the exchange rate on the parallel market which sold the U.S. dollar for SF 3,250.

With the beginning of 2004 the Surinamese dollar (SRD) was introduced with an exchange rate of 1000 Surinamese gulden to 1 Surinamese dollar. Before 2004: Surinamese gulden (SRG) = 100 cent, SRD 1 = SRG 1000; coins had extremely low official value and a much higher collector's value; their official value has now been multiplied by 1000: the value in SRD cent is equal to the former value in SRG cent. The same applies for "currency notes" (SRG 1 and 2.50).

Surinamese guilders per US dollar - 2,346.75 (2002), 2,178.5 (2001), 1,322.47 (2000), 859.44 (1999), 401 (1998)
Note: during 1998, the exchange rate splintered into four distinct rates; in January 1999 the government floated the guilder, but subsequently fixed it when the black-market rate plunged; the government then allowed trading within a band of SRG 500 around the official rate

Between 2004 and 2022, the value of the new Surinamese dollar (SRD) was set by the central bank. The Central Bank of Suriname spent much of Suriname's foreign currency reserves supporting the official exchange rates as inflation and other factors caused the real value of the Surinamese dollar to decline against other reserve currencies. As with the previous Surinamese guilder, the difference between the official exchange rate and the decreasing real value of the currency allowed black market currency trading to thrive. In June 2021, the central bank devalued the SRD by 33% and announced the currency would float freely. By June 2022, official exchange rates began to reflect the real floating exchange rate.

== Economic policy ==
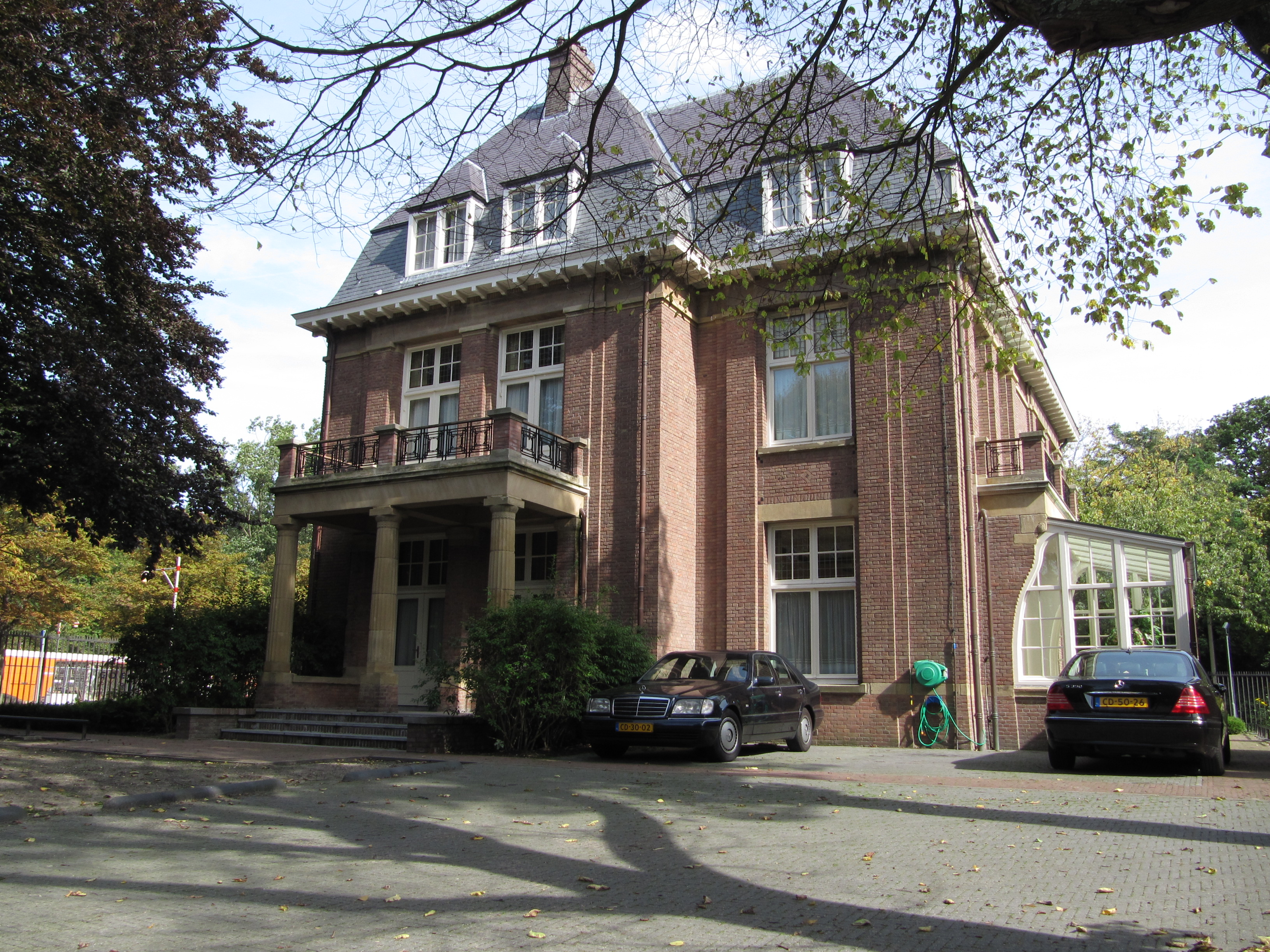
The Suriname-Netherlands Chamber at the embassy of Suriname in The Hague

There are several Chambers of Commerce that are supporting the economy. The general Chamber of Commerce and Factories (KKF) is located in Paramaribo. It was founded on 1 May 1910 and has nearly 30,000 members in 2019 that provide more than 150,000 jobs. Next to that, there are several international Chambers. One of them is the Suriname-Netherlands Chamber of Commerce that is established at the embassy of Suriname in The Hague. At the Chamber it is possible to found a Surinamese company in the Netherlands. Furthermore, there is a Suriname-Guyana Chamber of Commerce, a Suriname-India Chamber of Commerce and Industry and a Ghana-Suriname Chamber of Commerce.

In 2021 the government of Suriname founded the Suriname Investment and Trade Agency (SITA) to support international investments in Suriname and exports of Surinamese products abroad.

=== External debt and restructuring ===
As of February 2021, Suriname's external debt stands at US$4 billion. Of this amount, the nation sought to restructure a total of US$675 million in loans. Suriname retained French investment bank Lazard to act as its financial advisor during the restructuring.

== Economic statistics ==
Exports of Suriname by product category (2019) Chemical products Transportation Machines Mineral products Plastics and rubbers Metals Foodstuffs Precious metals Textiles Instruments Animal products Vegetable products Paper goods Footwear and headwear Miscellaneous Stone and glass Wood products Animal and vegetable bi-products Animal hides Arts and antiques Weapons

The following table shows the main economic indicators in 1980–2021 (with IMF staff estimates for 2020–2028). Inflation below 5% is in green.

Uncollapse first
| Year | GDP (in Bil. US$PPP) | GDP per capita (in US$ PPP) | GDP (in Bil. US$nominal) | GDP per capita (in US$ nominal) | GDP growth (real) | Inflation rate (in Percent) | Unemployment (in Percent) | Government debt (in % of GDP) |
| 1980 | ▲2.19 | n/a | ▲1.28 | n/a | ▼-6.5% | n/a | n/a | n/a |
| 1981 | ▲2.44 | n/a | ▲1.43 | n/a | ▲1.9% | n/a | n/a | n/a |
| 1982 | ▲2.43 | n/a | ▲1.47 | n/a | ▼-6.3% | n/a | n/a | n/a |
| 1983 | ▼2.39 | n/a | ▼1.42 | n/a | ▲-5.1% | n/a | n/a | n/a |
| 1984 | ▲2.41 | n/a | ▼1.39 | n/a | ▼-3.0% | n/a | n/a | n/a |
| 1985 | ▲2.46 | n/a | ▲1.40 | n/a | ▲-0.9% | n/a | n/a | n/a |
| 1986 | ▼2.45 | n/a | ▲1.43 | n/a | ▼-2.4% | n/a | n/a | n/a |
| 1987 | ▼2.29 | n/a | ▲1.57 | n/a | ▼-8.8% | n/a | n/a | n/a |
| 1988 | ▲2.63 | n/a | ▲1.86 | n/a | ▲10.8% | n/a | n/a | n/a |
| 1989 | ▲2.79 | n/a | ▲2.18 | n/a | ▼2.3% | n/a | n/a | n/a |
| 1990 | ▲2.85 | ▲6,984.2 | ▼0.58 | ▼1,413.6 | ▼-1.5% | n/a | n/a | ▲72.9% |
| 1991 | ▼2.54 | ▼6,132.3 | ▲0.64 | ▲1,536.0 | ▼-13.8% | ▲14.0% | n/a | ▲75.7% |
| 1992 | ▲2.70 | ▲6,440.0 | ▼0.59 | ▼1,406.6 | ▲3.9% | ▲33.0% | n/a | ▼64.4% |
| 1993 | ▲2.70 | ▼6,352.8 | ▼0.47 | ▼1,093.1 | ▼-2.2% | ▲139.1% | n/a | ▼51.1% |
| 1994 | ▼2.57 | ▼5,963.0 | ▲0.52 | ▲1,213.3 | ▼-7.0% | ▲255.8% | ▲12.4% | ▼30.5% |
| 1995 | ▲2.92 | ▲6,676.7 | ▲0.99 | ▲2,270.8 | ▲11.3% | ▲-49.3% | ▼8.4% | ▼16.3% |
| 1996 | ▲3.31 | ▲7,470.8 | ▲1.23 | ▲2,790.0 | ▼11.2% | ▲4.2% | ▲10.9% | ▼11.8% |
| 1997 | ▲3.60 | ▲8,012.7 | ▲1.32 | ▲2,945.3 | ▼7.0% | ▲17.0% | ▼9.8% | ▲16.8% |
| 1998 | ▲3.72 | ▲8,182.7 | ▲1.59 | ▲3,495.3 | ▼2.2% | ▲14.9% | ▲10.6% | ▲21.6% |
| 1999 | ▲3.74 | ▲8,103.4 | ▼1.31 | ▼2,837.2 | ▼-0.9% | ▲71.9% | ▲12.0% | ▲32.3% |
| 2000 | ▲3.82 | ▲8,180.0 | ▲1.36 | ▲2,904.5 | ▼-0.1% | ▲44.7% | ▲13.8% | ▲35.7% |
| 2001 | ▲4.09 | ▲8,646.6 | ▼1.17 | ▼2,464.8 | ▲4.9% | ▲0.9% | ▼13.7% | ▲37.2% |
| 2002 | ▲4.31 | ▲9,001.5 | ▲1.47 | ▲3,075.4 | ▼3.7% | ▲28.4% | ▼9.7% | ▼35.6% |
| 2003 | ▲4.67 | ▲9,650.7 | ▲1.73 | ▲3,571.6 | ▲6.1% | ▲13.1% | ▼6.5% | ▼31.3% |
| 2004 | ▲5.15 | ▲10,444.0 | ▲2.0 | ▲4,057.7 | ▲7.4% | ▲9.1% | ▲8.4% | ▼29.5% |
| 2005 | ▲5.57 | ▲11,171.8 | ▲2.39 | ▲4,800.8 | ▼4.9% | ▲20.1% | ▲11.1% | ▼27.1% |
| 2006 | ▲6.07 | ▲12,042.7 | ▲2.81 | ▲5,577.1 | ▲5.8% | ▲4.8% | ▲12.3% | ▼22.5% |
| 2007 | ▲6.56 | ▲12,853.2 | ▲3.14 | ▲6,165.5 | ▼5.1% | ▲8.3% | ▼10.7% | ▼16.4% |
| 2008 | ▲6.96 | ▲13,456.3 | ▲3.78 | ▲7,316.5 | ▼4.1% | ▲9.4% | ▼9.4% | ▼14.8% |
| 2009 | ▲7.21 | ▲13,762.5 | ▲4.15 | ▲7,917.3 | ▼3.0% | ▲1.3% | ▼8.7% | ▼14.6% |
| 2010 | ▲7.68 | ▲13,453.2 | ▲4.68 | ▲8,806.0 | ▲5.2% | ▲10.3% | ▼7.2% | ▲17.3% |
| 2011 | ▲8.30 | ▲15,363.4 | ▲4.74 | ▼8,770.3 | ▲5.8% | ▲5.2% | ▲7.5% | ▲18.7% |
| 2012 | ▲9.15 | ▲16,889.6 | ▲5.33 | ▲9,844.7 | ▼2.7%▼ | ▲4.3% | ▲8.1% | ▲20.1% |
| 2013 | ▲9.85 | ▲17,908.8 | ▲5.51 | ▲10,013.7 | ▲2.9% | ▲0.6% | ▼6.6% | ▲$27.9 |
| 2014 | ▲10.23 | ▲18,301.2 | ▲5.61 | ▲10,042.7 | ▼0.3% | ▲3.9% | ▼5.5% | 25.2% |
| 2015 | ▼9.62 | ▼16,962.5 | ▼5.13 | ▼9,036.3 | ▼-3.4% | ▲25.1% | ▲7.0% | ▲41.1% |
| 2016 | ▼8.51 | ▼14,777.8 | ▼3.32 | ▼5,761.8 | ▼-4.9% | ▲52.4% | ▲10.0% | ▲74.8% |
| 2017 | ▲10.23 | ▲17,879.6 | ▲3.59 | ▲6,156.5 | ▲1.6% | ▲9.3% | ▼7.0% | ▼71.5% |
| 2018 | ▼9.62 | ▲18,997.3 | ▲4.00 | ▲6,772.1 | ▲4.9% | ▲5.4% | ▲9.0% | ▼66.1% |
| 2019 | ▼8.51 | ▲19,292.1 | ▼3.98 | ▼6,662.9 | ▼1.1% | ▲4.2% | ▼8.8% | ▲80.8% |
| 2020 | ▲9.83 | ▼16,311.2 | ▼2.88 | ▼4,786.8 | ▼-15.9% | ▲60.7% | ▲11.1% | ▲143.8% |
| 2021 | ▲9.99 | ▲16,379.9 | ▲2.99 | ▼4,896.1 | ▲-2.7% | ▲60.7% | ▲11.2% | ▼117.0% |
| 2022 | ▲10.83 | ▲17,549.9 | ▲3.52 | ▲5,705.7 | ▲1.3% | ▲54.6% | ▼10.9% | ▲123.2% |
| 2023 | ▲11.51 | ▲18,427.1 | ▼3.47 | ▼5,556.5 | ▲2.3% | ▲28.2% | ▼10.6% | ▼112.2% |
| 2024 | ▲12.11 | ▲19,871.4 | ▲3.78 | ▲5,980.7 | 3.0% | ▲15.1% | ▼10.3% | ▼103.2% |
| 2025 | ▲12.71 | ▼19,163.2 | ▲3.96 | ▲6,198.4 | 3.0% | ▲11.1% | ▼10% | ▼96.2% |
| 2026 | ▲13.33 | ▲19,871.4 | ▲4.19 | ▲6,468.5 | 3.0% | ▲8.3% | ▼9.9% | ▼89.6% |
| 2027 | ▲13.98 | ▲20,601.6 | ▲4.44 | ▲6,772.2 | 3.0% | ▲6.0% | ▼9.0% | ▼83.6% |
| 2028 | ▲14.68 | ▲22,138.3 | ▲4.69 | ▲7,070.5 | 3.0% | ▲5.0% | ▼8.5% | ▼78.9% |

== Energy ==
Here follows the energy statistics of Suriname.

Uncollapse first
Electricity access
electrification - total population: 97.4% (2018)
electrification - urban areas: 99% (2018)
electrification - rural areas: 94.3% (2018)
Electricity capacity
installed generating capacity: 542,000 kW (2020 est.)
consumption: 2,938,391,000 kWh (2019 est.)
exports: 0 kWh (2019 est.)
imports: 808 million kWh (2019 est.)
transmission/distribution losses: 234 million kWh (2019 est.)
Electricity generation sources
fossil fuels: 40.5% of total installed capacity (2020 est.)
nuclear: 0% of total installed capacity (2020 est.)
solar: 0.4% of total installed capacity (2020 est.)
wind: 0% of total installed capacity (2020 est.)
hydroelectricity: 58.8% of total installed capacity (2020 est.)
tide and wave: 0% of total installed capacity (2020 est.)
geothermal: 0% of total installed capacity (2020 est.)
biomass and waste: 0.3% of total installed capacity (2020 est.)
Coal and gas
No production, consumption, exports, imports of reserves (2020 est.)
Petroleum
total petroleum production: 14,800 bbl/day (2021 est.)
refined petroleum consumption: 15,800 bbl/day (2019 est.)
crude oil and lease condensate exports: 0 bbl/day (2018 est.)
crude oil and lease condensate imports: 200 bbl/day (2018 est.)
crude oil estimated reserves: 89 million barrels (2021 est.)
Refined petroleum products - production

7,571 bbl/day (2015 est.) country comparison to the world: 101

Refined petroleum products - exports

14,000 bbl/day (2015 est.) country comparison to the world: 74

Refined petroleum products - imports

10,700 bbl/day (2015 est.) country comparison to the world: 145

Carbon dioxide emissions

2.372 million metric tonnes of CO2 (2019 est.)

from coal and metallurgical coke: 0 metric tonnes of CO2 (2019 est.)
from petroleum and other liquids: 2.361 million metric tonnes of CO2 (2019 est.)
from consumed natural gas: 11,000 metric tonnes of CO2 (2019 est.)country comparison to the world: 156
Energy consumption per capita

82.356 million Btu/person (2019 est.) country comparison to the world: 71

== See also ==
- Economy of South America
- Ministry of Finance (Suriname)
