= Suriname Stock Exchange =

- Type: Stock exchange
- Location: Paramaribo, Suriname
- Founded: 1 Januari 1994
- Owner: Vereniging voor de Effectenhandel in Suriname (VvES)
- Currency: Surinamese dollar (SRD)
- No. of listings: 12
- Website: www.surinamestockexchange.com

The Suriname Stock Exchange (SSX) is the stock exchange of Suriname. It is being organized by an association called the Vereniging voor de Effectenhandel in Suriname (VvES), and it was founded on 1 January 1994.

The trade in stocks does not happen on a daily base, but twice a month on the first and third Thursday. In 2014 the National Assembly adopted the Law Capital Market (Wet Kapitaalmarkt), in line with a demand of the Caribbean Financial Action Task Force. In 2019 the VvES and the Surinamese American financial technological company OuroX signed a memorandum of understanding to found a digital stock exchange, in accordance to obligations that are provided in the law. According to the law the stock exchange should have been suborderd to the Central Bank of Suriname. Both are not yet realized (as per 2023).

Some notable moments out of the history of the stock exchange are the subscription to US$55 million stocks of Staatsolie Suriname NV in 2010, the move from Buiten-Sociëteit Het Park to the trainingcenter of Assuria in 2011 and the launch of the website in the same year.

== Listed ==
- Assuria NV
- NV Consolidated Industries Corporation (CIC)
- De Surinaamsche Bank NV
- NV Elgawa
- Hakrinbank NV
- NV Surinaamse Assurantie Maatschappij Self Reliance
- Staatsolie Suriname NV
- Surinaamse Brouwerij NV
- NV Hotelmaatschappij Torarica
- Varossieau Suriname NV
- NV Verenigde Surinaamse Holdingmij (VSH)
- NV VSH Foods (formerly Margarine- en Vettenfabriek NV, since 2000 part of VSH

== See also ==
- List of companies of Suriname
- Economy of Suriname
