= Chamber of Commerce and Factories =

Surinamese institution

- Kamer van Koophandel en Fabrieken
- Abbreviation: KKF
- Formation: May 1, 1910; 116 years ago
- Purpose: serving companies with advice and registering companies on the company register
- Location: Paramaribo, Suriname
- Coordinates: 5.830833°N 55.184167°W
- Members: nearly 30,000
- Website: Official website

The Chamber of Commerce and Factories, native name Kamer van Koophandel en Fabrieken (KKF), is a Surinamese institution that offers advice to companies before, during and after the start, and registers them in the company register. The company register is being published at the website of Suriname Directory.

Until 2008 the offices were established at the Mr. Dr. J.C. de Mirandastraat #10, and are since then at the Prof. W.J.A. Kernkampweg #37, where also the KKF Hall is situated.

== History ==
The KKF was founded on 1 May 1910 in the building of the commercial De Surinaamsche Bank (DSB) in Paramaribo. On that moment the KKF did not yet have judicial importance, however had the character of an interest association. From 1910 to 1938 the number of members grew from nine to eleven. In 2019 the number of members is nearly 30,000 that provide more than 150,000 jobs.

Since the Trade Register Regulation of 1936, the KKF has been maintaining the mandatory registration of all businesses in Suriname. Since 2002, it has been publishing an information sheet providing guidance on the business environment and promoting entrepreneurship.

== Business fairs ==
The KKF organizes an annual fair from late November to early December, attracting around 100,000 visitors from the Caribbean region. Additionally, it is the organizer of the annual fair Agro - ICT - Made n Suriname. Furthermore, it organizes the United Business Fair with the media company United. The fairs are usually held in the nearby Hall of Business (Hal van het Bedrijfsleven), also known as the KKF Hall.

== Legal forms ==
The usual legal forms for companies in Suriname are the sole proprietorship (eenmanszaak) and the naamloze vennootschap (NV). Other forms are the general partnership (vennootschap onder firma; VOF), the commanditaire vennootschap (CV), the mutual insurance (onderlinge waarborgmaatschappij; OWM), the cooperative (co-op), public legal entities, formally foreign companies, foundations and associations. Since the introduction of the Annual Accounts Act on August 31, 2017, legal entities are obliged to publish a financial statement for each fiscal year.

== See also ==
- Economy of Suriname
- Ghana-Suriname Chamber of Commerce
- Suriname-Guyana Chamber of Commerce
- Suriname-India Chamber of Commerce and Industry
- Suriname-Netherlands Chamber of Commerce
