= Jacques Drielsma =

Surinamese politician

Prime Minister of Suriname (acting)
- In office 5 April 1951 – 4 June 1951
- Monarch: Queen Juliana
- Preceded by: Julius Caesar de Miranda
- Succeeded by: Jan Buiskool

Minister of Finance
- In office 3 June 1949 – Jan 1952

Personal details
- Born: Jacques Adam Drielsma; 14 October 1886 Amsterdam, Netherlands
- Died: 31 July 1974 (aged 87) Paramaribo, Suriname
- Political party: Independent politician
- Spouse: Georgine Wildeboer (1919–his death)

Jacques Adam Drielsma (Note: Also written as Jaques.) (14 October 1886 – 31 July 1974) was a Surinamese lawyer and notary who served as acting Prime Minister of Suriname in 1951, and Finance minister between 1949 and 1952. In 1957, he was sentenced to two years in prison for embezzlement.

== Biography ==
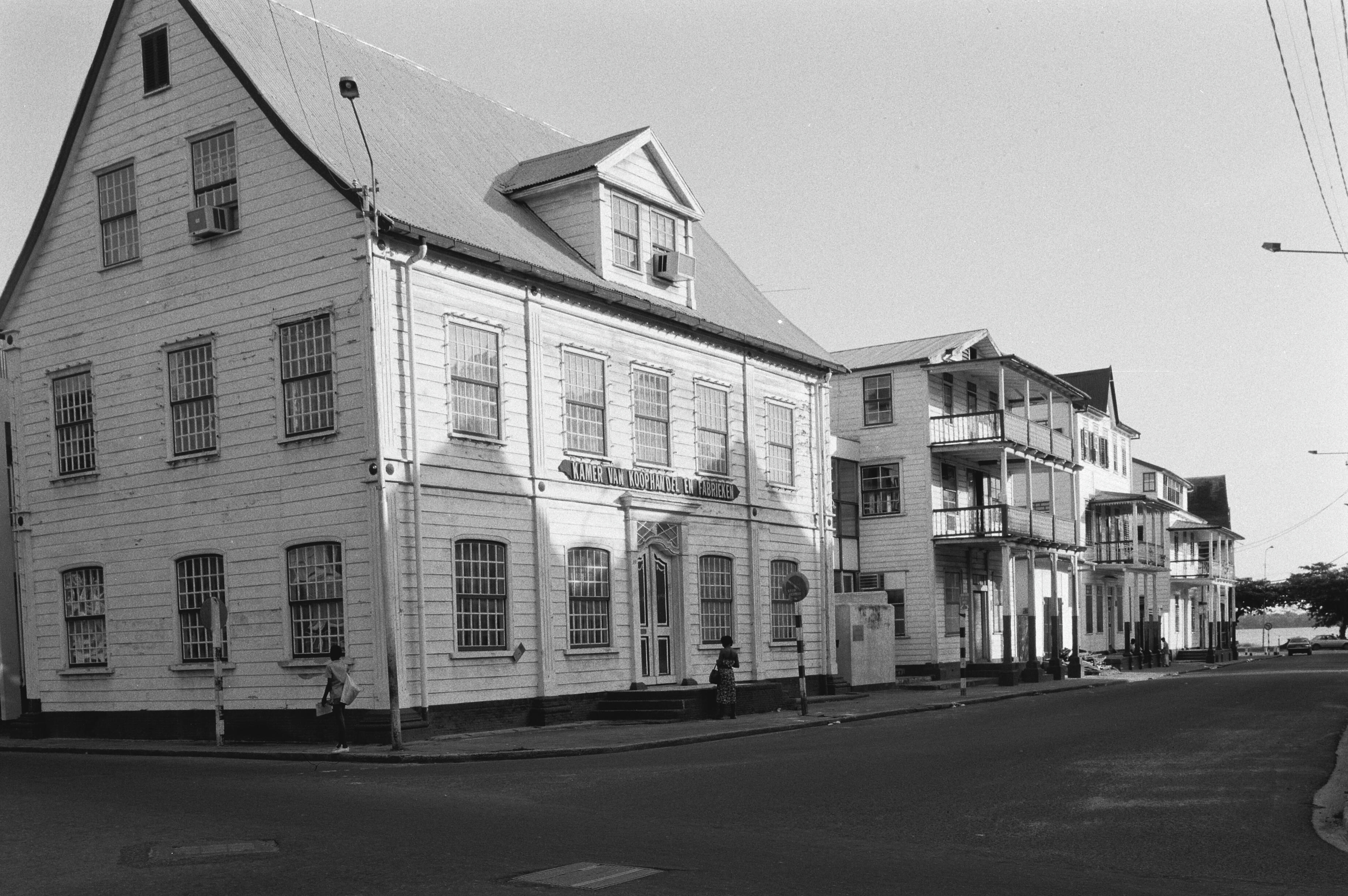
Drielsma's notary office. Later used by the Chamber of Commerce

Drielsma was born on 14 October 1886 in Amsterdam from a Surinamese mother and a Frisian father. After receiving his praktizijn (non-academic law degree) in Suriname in 1916, he started to work as a lawyer. On 1 June 1926, he became a notary and successor to Da Costa who had retired.

Drielsma was first elected to the Colonial States in 1923. and served until 1930. On 27 June 1949, he became Minister of Finance in the cabinet of Julius Caesar de Miranda. In January 1952, he resigned due to a conflict of interest, because the Vervuurts Bank of which he was a commissioner was in bankruptcy court.

On 5 April 1951, he was appointed acting Prime Minister of Suriname, and served until 4 June 1951, when he was succeeded by Jan Buiskool.

Drielsma's notary office went bankrupt in 1956 with a debt of ƒ 1.15 million (about US$6.2 million in 2021). His notary office also acted as a mortgage bank where people could deposit their money at interest. About 400 people had an account at his office. On 27 July 1957, he was sentenced to two years imprisonment for embezzlement.

Drielsma died on 31 July 1974 in Paramaribo, at the age of 87.

== Honours ==
- Officer of the Order of Orange-Nassau (1930).
