= Ghana-Suriname Chamber of Commerce =

- Ghana-Suriname Kamer van Koophandel
- Formation: 2018-2019
- Founder: Susan Alfred-Walcott
- Purpose: Improving the trade relation between Suriname and Ghana
- Headquarters: Ghana

The Ghana-Suriname Chamber of Commerce, Surinamese (Dutch language) name Ghana-Suriname Kamer van Koophandel, is a chamber of commerce with the goal to improve the trade relationship between Suriname and Ghana.

The Chamber is an initiative from 2018 of Susan Alfred-Walcott, a Trinidadian who emigrated to Ghana in the 20th century. The idea arose in the run-up to the Year of Return that President Nana Akufo-Addo launched in the context of the 400 years of the Ghanaian diaspora. Prior to the initiative, the Ghanaian authorities had asked her to promote Suriname and the Caribbean part of the Kingdom of the Netherlands during the anniversary year. Enhancing the trade relationship with Ghana was part of this. In the preparations, consultations were made with economist Armand Zunder and former minister Siegmien Staphorst, the than chairman of NAKS (National Art and Culture Foundation of Suriname).

Also in 2018, she asked Barryl Biekman, an activist for the African diaspora in Europe and Dutch-speaking countries, to take charge of the chamber. She ultimately agreed in mid-2020. The chamber is staffed by four individuals with experience in international business who are well acquainted with both countries.

Suriname also has an embassy in Ghana. The Ghanaian ambassador to Suriname resides in Brasília.

== See also ==
- Economy of Ghana and of Suriname
- List of company registers
- Chamber of Commerce and Factories
- Suriname-Netherlands Chamber of Commerce
- Suriname-Guyana Chamber of Commerce
- Suriname-India Chamber of Commerce and Industry
