= SSX (disambiguation) =

SSX is a snowboarding and skiing video game series published by EA Sports.

SSX may also refer to:

- SSX (2000 video game), the first video game in the SSX series
- SSX (2012 video game), a reboot of the SSX series
- SSX/VSE, an IBM DOS-derived operating system for mid-range System/370 based architectures
- Sussex, county in England, Chapman code
- Surabaya Stock Exchange
- Suriname Stock Exchange
- Synovial sarcoma, X breakpoint

== See also ==
- Arcadia of My Youth: Endless Orbit SSX, a series in the Captain Harlock franchise
