= Jan Buiskool =

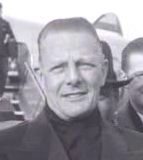
- Jan Buiskool (1948)

Prime Minister of Suriname
- In office 4 June 1951 – 6 September 1952
- Monarch: Juliana
- Preceded by: Jacques Drielsma
- Succeeded by: Adriaan Alberga

Personal details
- Born: Johannes Ate Eildert Buiskool; 15 September 1899 Koedijk, Netherlands
- Died: 30 October 1960 (aged 61) Gorssel, Netherlands
- Political party: Independent

Jan Buiskool (15 September 1899 – 30 October 1960) was Surinamese Prime Minister and judge in Suriname, the Netherlands and Tangier.

== Biography ==
Buiskool was born as Johannes Ate Eildert Buiskool on 15 September 1899 in Koedijk, Netherlands. His father was a Protestant minister. On 6 September 1902, his father received an appointment in Suriname, and the family emigrated to Suriname where Buiskool spent his childhood. He returned to the Netherlands to study, and graduated in Dutch Law in June 1929 from the University of Amsterdam and was appointed judge. In 1935, he received his doctorate on a thesis about the Independence of the Philippines.

In 1939, Buiskool wrote Surinaamsch Staatsrecht about the Constitutional Law in Suriname and the necessity for change. In 1941, he was arrested by Nazi Germany for political activities, and sent to Sachsenhausen concentration camp. He was released in 1942. On 8 May 1945, after the Liberation of the Netherlands, Buiskool was appointed acting mayor of Schagen.

In December 1945, Buiskool was appointed to the High Court of Justice of Suriname. In 1947, he was appointed acting Governor-General. In 1948, he became a member of the Round Table Conference about the future of the Dutch empire. Buiskool would become one of the main authors of the Charter for the Kingdom of the Netherlands in which Suriname became a constituent country within the Kingdom of the Netherlands.

In 1951, Jopie Pengel of the National Party of Suriname recommended Buiskool as Prime Minister of Suriname which he accepted. On 21 July 1952, while Buiskool was in the Netherlands, complaints were raised about Buiskool in the Estates of Suriname. Not only were complaints raised about his frequent absences, Jopie Pengel (NPS) and Soekdew Mungra (VHP) questioned the validity a SRG 6,000.- declaration for expenses. Buiskool returned to Suriname, and defended himself against the accusations on 25 August 1952. After his defence, Johan Kraag, the Chairman of the Estates, considered the matter closed, however Buiskool asked to be dismissed as prime minister.

In August 1953, Buiskool was appointed one of the three judges for the Tangier International Zone. In 1958, he returned to the Netherlands and was appointed judge in Deventer.

Buiskool died on 30 October 1960 in Gorssel at the age of 61.
