= Hoefdraad =

Hoefdraad is a surname. Notable people with the surname include:

- Gillmore Hoefdraad (born 1962), Surinamese economist and politician
- Jergé Hoefdraad (1986–2021), Dutch footballer
