= Harry Radhakishun =

Surinamese politician

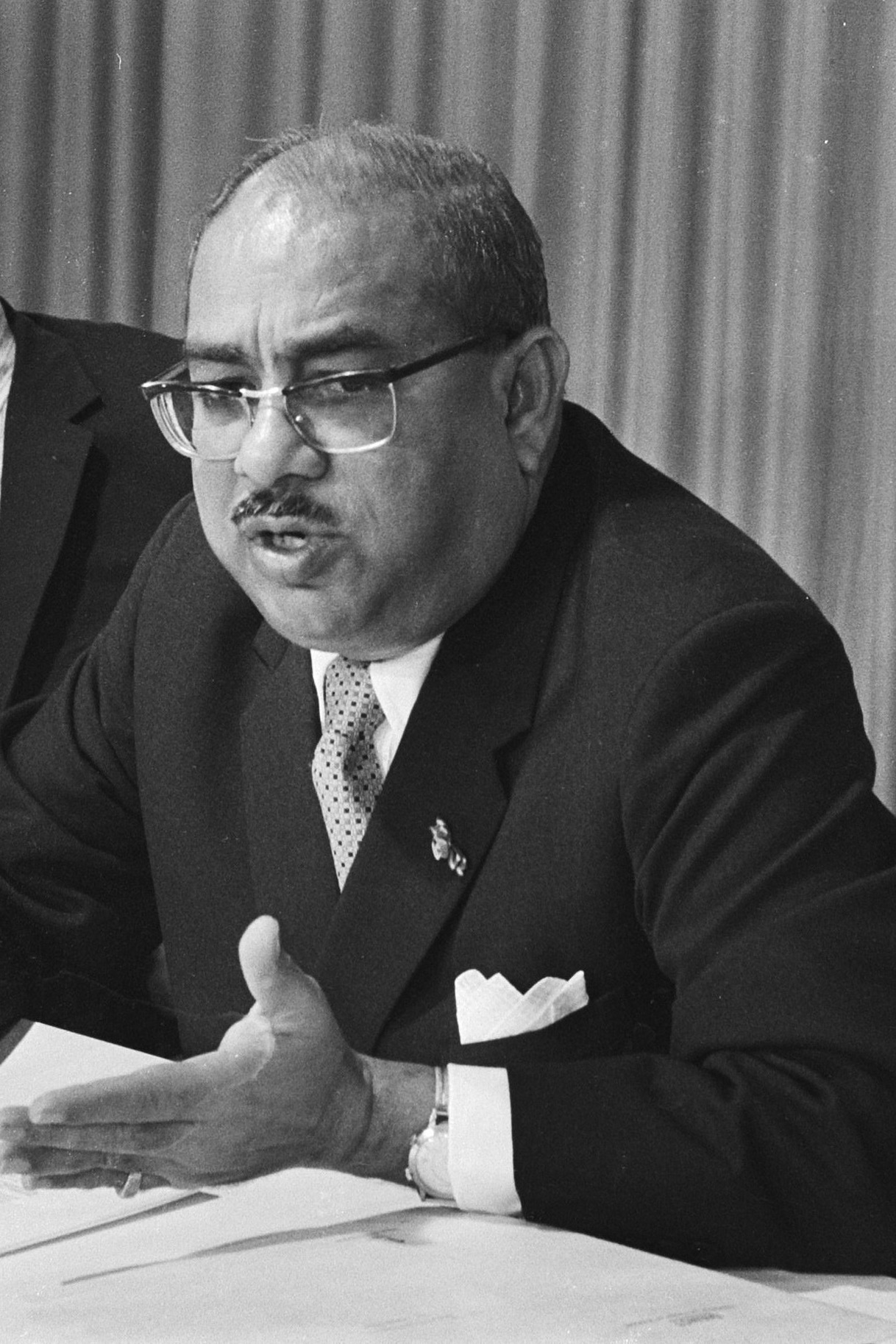
- Radhakishun in 1971

4th Deputy Prime Minister of Suriname
- In office 20 November 1969 – 24 December 1973
- Prime Minister: Jules Sedney
- Preceded by: Johan Kraag
- Succeeded by: Olton van Genderen

Minister of Finance
- In office 20 November 1969 – 24 December 1973
- Prime Minister: Jules Sedney
- Preceded by: Edgar Wijngaarde
- Succeeded by: Henck Arron

Minister of Agriculture, Livestock and Fisheries
- In office 30 June 1963 – 15 March 1967
- Prime Minister: Johan Adolf Pengel
- Preceded by: Sewraam Rambaran Mishre
- Succeeded by: R.L. Jankie

Personal details
- Born: Harry Sharuh Radhakishun; 25 July 1921 Paramaribo, Suriname
- Died: 3 January 1983 (aged 61) Amsterdam, The Netherlands
- Party: VHP
- Spouse: Stephane (Fanny) Radhakishun-van Bruggen

Harry Sharuh Radhakishun (25 July 1921 – 3 January 1983) was a Surinamese businessman and politician. He served as Deputy Prime Minister of Suriname and Minister of Finance from 1969 to 1973, and as Minister of Agriculture, Livestock and Fisheries from 1963 to 1967.

== Early life ==
Radhakishun was born in Paramaribo in 1921. He studied at the Hendrikschool (Mulo), and also attended law classes taught by Julius Caesar de Miranda. He took part for a few years in the correspondence course for accountancy and commercial sciences offered by the La Salle Extension University in Chicago.

== Publisher ==
Together with his wife Fanny and close friend Lou Lichtveld, Radhakishun established the publishing house Radhakishun & Co. in Paramaribo in 1952.

== Politics ==
Radhakishun was a founding member of the VHP. He was a member of the Estates of Suriname (national legislature) from 1951 to 1963 and from 1967 to 1969.

== Death ==
Radhakishun died in Amsterdam in January 1983 at the age of 61.

== Honours ==
- The Netherlands: Knight (Ridder), Order of the Netherlands Lion
- The Netherlands: Officer (Officier), then Commander (Commandeur), Order of Orange-Nassau
- Panama: Grand Cross (Gran Cruz), Order of Vasco Núñez de Balboa (1965)
- Colombia: Grand Cross (Gran Cruz), Order of San Carlos (1967)
