= Suriname-Netherlands Chamber of Commerce =

International chamber of commerce

- Suriname-Nederland Kamer van Koophandel
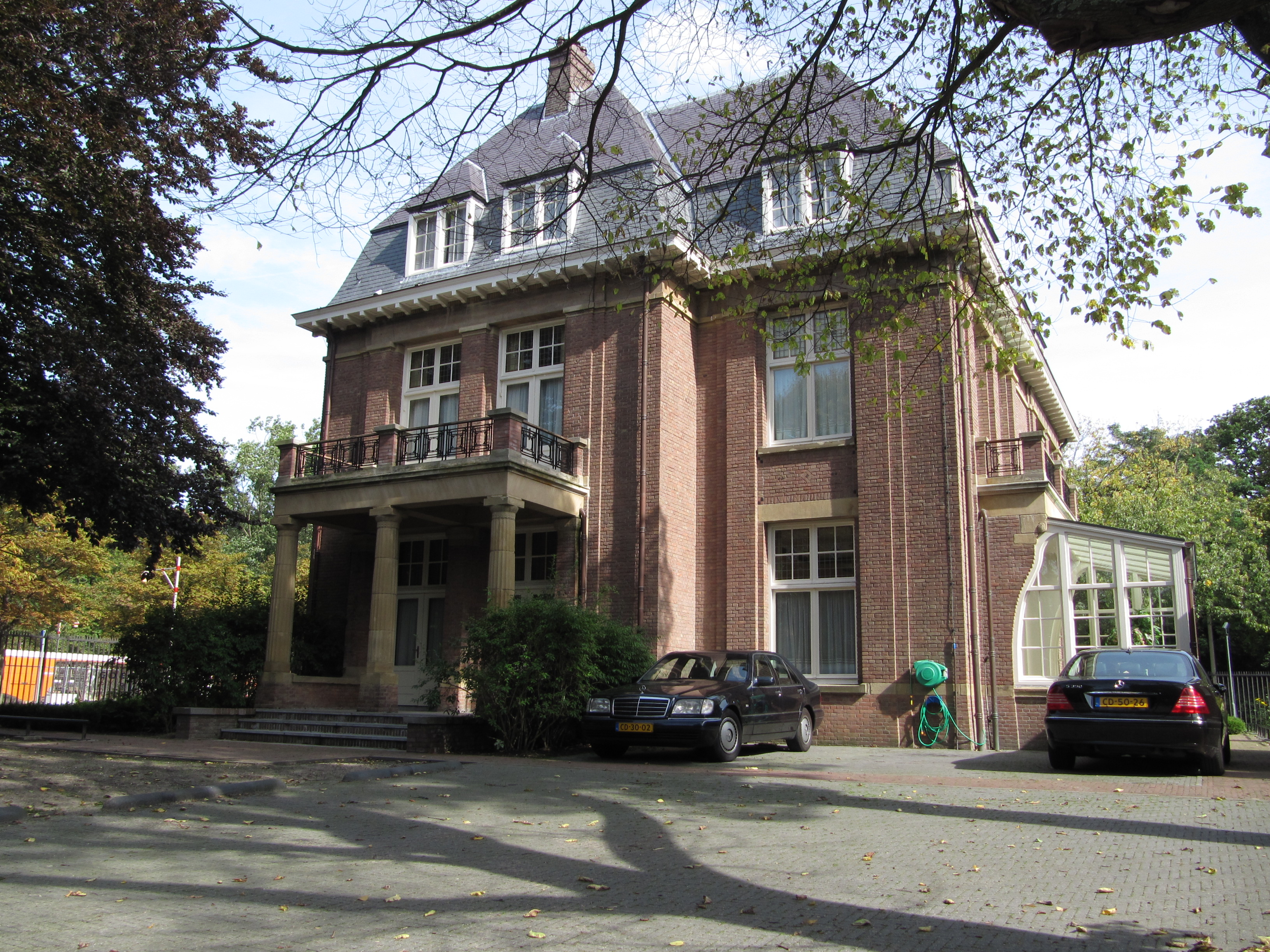
- Establishment in the embassy in The Hague
- Formation: May 9, 2018; 8 years ago
- Founder: Surinamese embassy in the Netherlands
- Founded at: Surinamese embassy
- Type: Public
- Purpose: Improving the entrepreneurial infrastructure en promoting commerce
- Coordinates: 52.087469°N 4.286461°E

The Suriname-Netherlands Chamber of Commerce, native name Suriname-Nederland Kamer van Koophandel, is a chamber of commerce with the goal to improve the entrepreneurial infrastructure en promote commerce between Suriname and the Netherlands.

The Chamber has been established in the building of the embassy of Suriname in The Hague. At the Chamber it is possible to found a Surinamese company in the Netherlands. In the run-up to the establishment, fifteen individuals in the Netherlands were preparing for a business venture in Suriname.

The organization was founded on 9 Mai 2018 in the embassy in The Hague. The initiative as taken by the embassy in cooperation with the Surinaams-Nederlandse Diaspora Associatie (SuNeDa), which maintains close contacts with the Surinamese Chamber of Commerce and Factories and ministry of Trade, Industry and Tourism. Signatories were the director of the ministry, Reina Raveles, and Vijay Gangadin of Diaspora Focal Point; Gangadin is since then the chairman of the Chamber. Ad-interim minister Mike Noersalim performed the official opening ceremony.

In October 2018, a Dutch-Chinese trade mission to Suriname was organized from the Chamber.

== See also ==
- Economy of the Netherlands and of Suriname
- List of company registers
- Chamber of Commerce and Factories
- Ghana-Suriname Chamber of Commerce
- Suriname-Guyana Chamber of Commerce
- Suriname-India Chamber of Commerce and Industry
