= Julius Caesar de Miranda =

Surinamese jurist and politician (1906–1956)

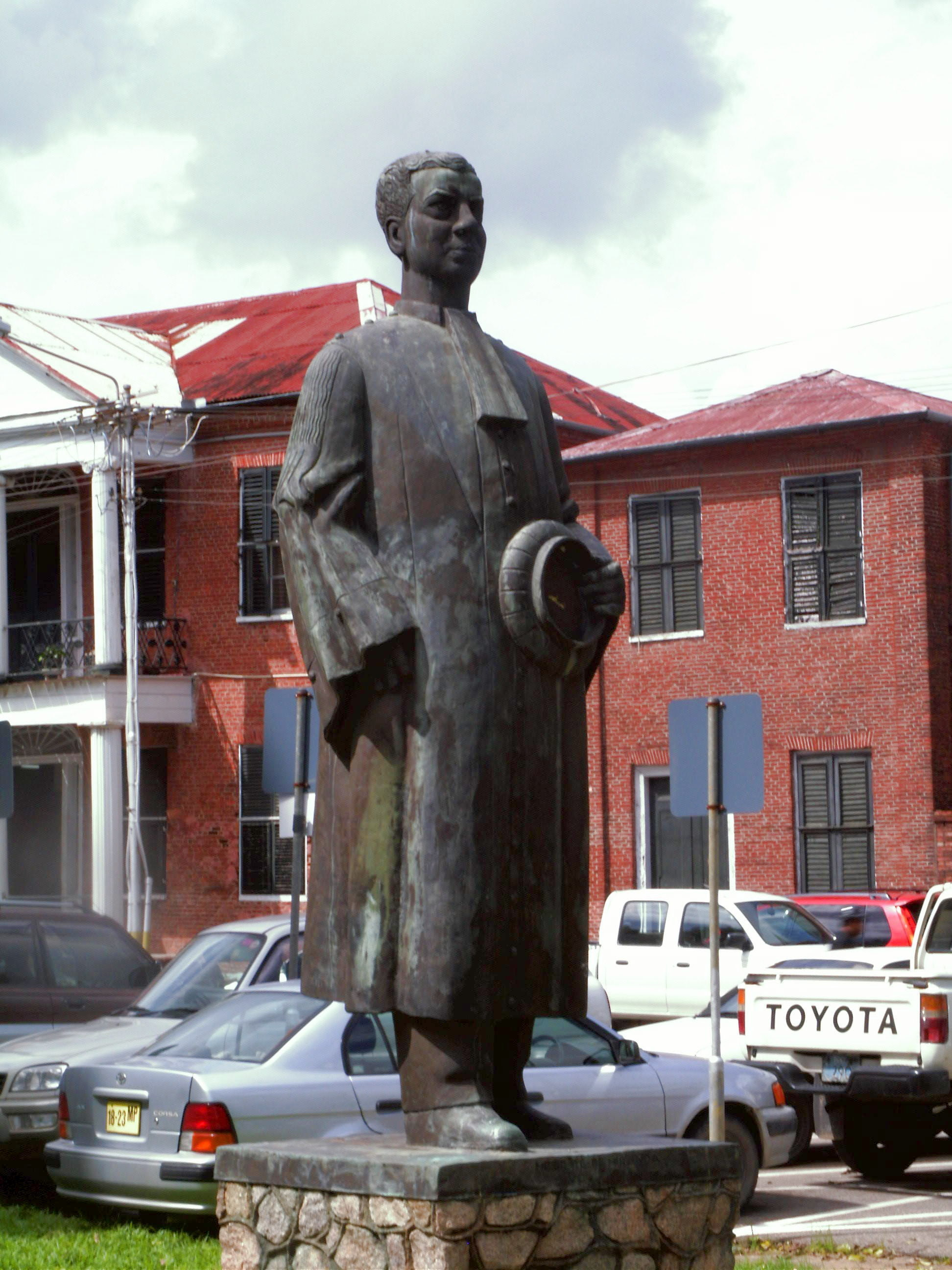
- Statue of J.C. de Miranda in Paramaribo

1st Prime Minister of Suriname
- In office 3 June 1949 – 2 April 1951
- Monarch: Queen Juliana
- Succeeded by: Jacques Drielsma

Personal details
- Born: 3 April 1906 Paramaribo, Suriname
- Died: 28 November 1956 (aged 50) Paramaribo, Suriname

Julius Caesar de Miranda (3 April 1906 – 28 November 1956) was a Surinamese jurist and politician. De Miranda was the first prime minister of Suriname.

== Biography ==
De Miranda was a descendant of an old established family of planters. He went to the Netherlands for his education, where he studied at the Barlaeus Gymnasium in Amsterdam, and then continued to study law at the University of Amsterdam. On 20 December 1928 he passed his state examination in law.

After returning to Suriname he worked as a lawyer in Paramaribo from 1929 to 1946. In 1946, he traveled to the Netherlands once again. He received a doctorate in legal science from the University of Amsterdam on 18 December 1946. His thesis was a plea for democratisation and self governance for Suriname. He was appointed to the Court of Paramaribo in the same year and was in the year of his death, even for a short time its president.

De Miranda was from 1932 to 1938 a member of the Colonial States. As an elected representative, he delivered open criticism of the official leadership of Governor Kielstra (1933–1944) and became vigorous proponent for a change of authority. De Miranda was of the opinion that the governor should no longer be the subject of the Dutch Minister for the Overseas territory parts, but responsible with his administration over the Surinamese community.

Between 1942 and 1946, he returned as a member of the Colonial States. He served as Minister of Justice and Police, Education and Finance. In addition, he was Prime Minister from 1949 to 1951. On 17 June 1949, De Miranda passed a law that the word colony was no longer allowed to be used in combination with Suriname in legal documents. The government fell over the Hospital Question in which Lou Lichtveld as Minister of Health had fired doctor Henk van Ommeren over alleged irregularities which were later proven false.

In 1955 he moved to the Netherlands, because of health reasons, but recovered and decided to return to Suriname. On 12 April 1956 he became President of the High Court of Justice which he remained until he died eight months later at the age of 50, on 28 November 1956 about 2 o'clock in the morning, to a coronary thrombosis.

Julius Caesar de Miranda was also an authoritative jurist who contributed much to the legal science in Suriname, and was a mentor and teacher to Jagernath Lachmon.

On 28 November 1961, a statue created by Leo Braat was unveiled by his widow. The statue which shows him in robe is located on the Mr. de Mirandastraat in the centre of Paramaribo.

== Literature ==
- Jules Sedney: De toekomst van ons verleden. Democratie, etniciteit en politieke machtsvorming in Suriname, Paramaribo 1997 (VACO Uitgeversmaatschappij). ISBN 9789991400549
