= Adriaan Alberga =

Surinamese politician

Prime Minister of Suriname
- In office 6 September 1952 – 4 December 1952
- Monarch: Queen Juliana
- Preceded by: Jan Buiskool
- Succeeded by: Archibald Currie

Minister of Justice and Police
- In office 4 June 1951 – 6 September 1952

Personal details
- Born: Adriaan Cornelis Jasper Marius Alberga; 14 February 1887; Paramaribo, Surinam
- Died: 4 December 1952 (aged 65); Paramaribo, Suriname
- Political party: Independent politician

Adriaan Cornelis Jasper Marius Alberga (14 February 1887 – 4 December 1952) was a Surinamese jurist. He served as Minister of Justice and Police from 1951 to 1952, and was Prime Minister of Suriname in 1952.

== Biography ==
Alberga was born on 14 February 1887 in Paramaribo. After receiving his praktizijn (non-academic law degree), he started to work for the courts. He was appointed clerk to the Kantongerecht (regional court) of Paramaribo. In 1924, he became District Commissioner for Saramacca. In 1928, he retired and became a lawyer.

After the 1951 elections, Alberga was appointed Minister of Justice and Police of Suriname in the cabinet of Buiskool. After the resignation of Buiskool, he became Prime Minister of Suriname on 6 September 1952.

Alberga died in office on 4 December 1952, at the age of 65. Archibald Currie was appointed his successor.
