= Caribbean Association of Investment Promotion Agencies =

The Caribbean Association of Investment Promotion Agencies (CAIPA) is a contingent of 24 national state-owned Investment promotion agencies situated in the Caribbean or Latin American regions. Founded in 2007 in Kingston, Jamaica as a partnership between the European Union and CARIFORUM, today the member countries in the association, consisting not only of independent states but also representation from the Dutch and British Overseas Territories.

== History ==
Until 2023 CAIPA has been under the regional body known as Caribbean Export Development Agency (Caribbean Export) which served as the secretariat of CAIPA. Funding has been under partnership as a Regional Private Sector Development Programme (RPSDP) funded by the European Union under the 10th European Development Fund.

== Network and affiliations ==
Host country	Host city	Body	Ref.
Anguilla	The Valley	Ministry	
Antigua and Barbuda	St. John's	Antigua and Barbuda Investment Authority	
Aruba	Oranjestad	Aruba Investment Agency (ARINA)	
Commonwealth of the Bahamas	Nassau	Bahamas Investment Authority	
Barbados	Bridgetown	Invest Barbados	
Belize	Belmopan	Belize Trade and Investment Development Service (BELTRAIDE)	
Bermuda	Hamilton	Bermuda Business Development Agency (BDA)	
Cayman Islands	Georgetown	Ministry	
Curaçao	Willemstad	Curaçao Investment and Export Promotion Agency (CINEX)	
Dominica	Roseau	Invest Dominica Authority	
Dominican Republic	Santo Domingo	Export and Investment Center of the Dominican Republic (ProDominicana)	
Grenada	St. George's	Grenada Investment Development Corporation (GIDC)	
Guyana	Georgetown	Guyana Office for Investment (GO-Invest)	
Haiti	Ouest, Port-au-Prince	Center for Facilitation of Investments (CFI)	
Jamaica	Kingston	Jamaica Promotions Corporation Ltd. (JAMPRO)	
Montserrat	Brades	Montserrat Invest	
Nevis	Charlestown	Nevis Investment Promotion Agency (NIPA)	
Saint Lucia	Castries	Invest Saint Lucia	
Saint Vincent and the Grenadines	Kingstown	Invest SVG	
Sint Maarten	Philipsburg	Ministry	
Suriname	Paramaribo	Suriname Investment and Trade Agency (SITA)	
Trinidad and Tobago	Port of Spain	InvesTT	
Turks and Caicos Islands	Providenciales	Invest Turks and Caicos	

Of aforementioned IPA entities above : Barbados, Bermuda, Curaçao, Dominican Republic, St. Kitts & Nevis, St. Lucia, and the Turks & Caicos Islands are also Member IPAs of the global World Association of Investment Promotion Agencies.

== See also ==
- List of countries by exports per capita
- List of countries by foreign direct investment inflows
- List of countries by service exports and imports
- Economy of Latin America and the Caribbean
- Secretariat of the Caribbean Community
- Organisation of Eastern Caribbean States
