= Suriname Investment and Trade Agency =

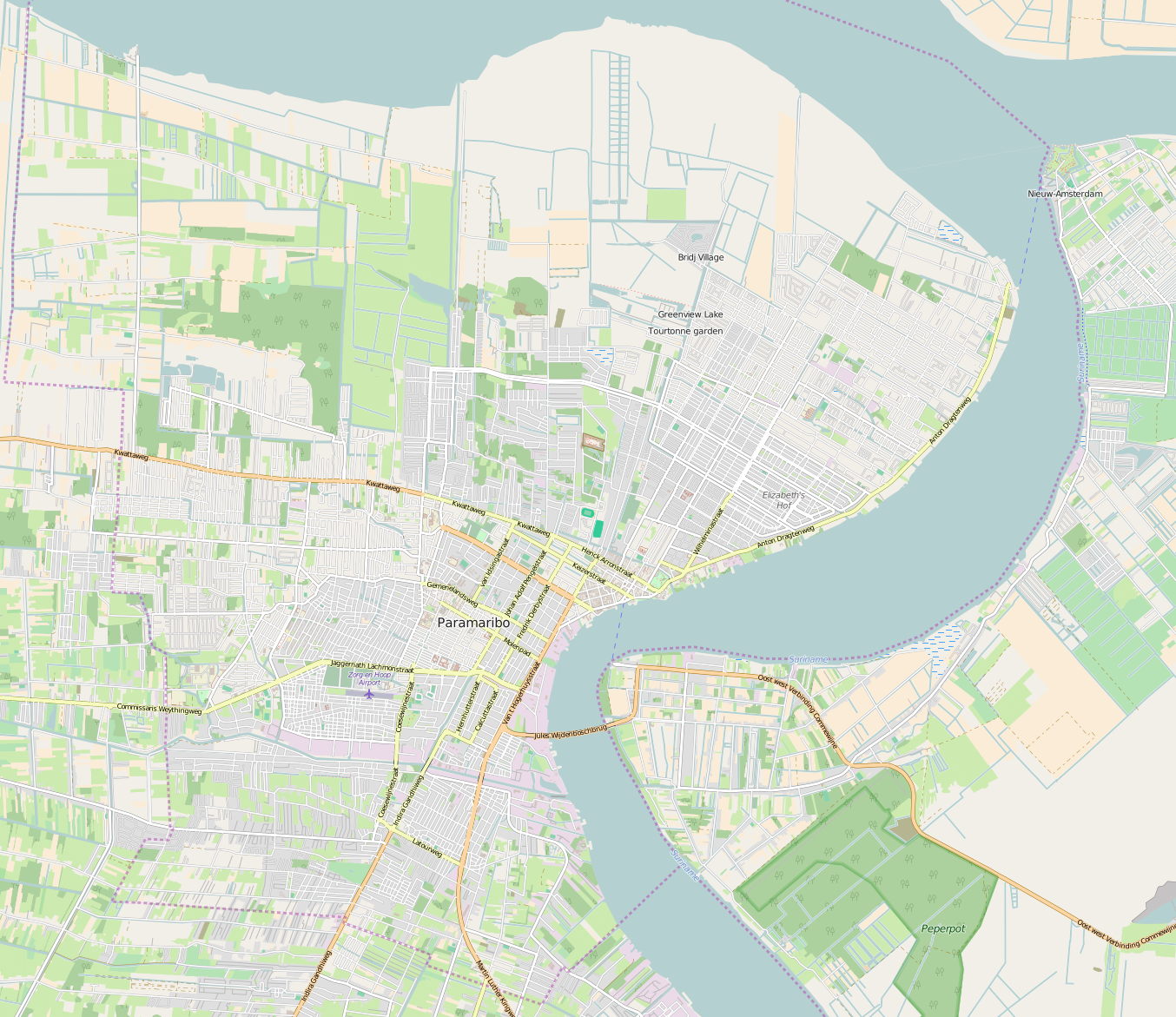
- Location within Paramaribo
- Abbreviation: SITA
- Founder: Ministry of Foreign Affairs, International Business, and International Cooperation (BIBIS)
- Type: Governmental organization
- Headquarters: Brokopondolaan #97
- Location: Paramaribo, Suriname
- Coordinates: 5.81575°N 55.193972°W
- Services: cooperation in investment and export
- Fields: investment and trade
- Official languages: English and Dutch
- Owner: Ministry of Foreign Affairs, International Business, and International Cooperation (BIBIS)
- Website: sita.sr

The Suriname Investment and Trade Agency (SITA) is a Surinamese government institution that was founded in 2021. SITA operates as an investment promotion agency affiliation with the Caribbean Association of Investment Promotion Agencies.

== Functions ==
The objective of SITA is to support international investments and to stimulate Surinamese exports. For this means it organizes meetings between companies, like on 24 July 2023 with ConnectAmericas, the biggest trade community of the Americas that was founded by the Inter-American Development Bank (IDB). In June 2024 SITA signed a memorandum of understanding with the Guyana Office for Investment (GO-Invest) to promote investments and trade between the two countries.

In addition, investments in Suriname are being encouraged. Through President Santokhi and Minister Ramdin of Foreign Affairs, International Business, and International Cooperation, SITA is involved in supporting foreign investors, such as in August 2023 with the investment plans of a Brazilian cattle company in Suriname. The president also brings SITA to the attention of investors abroad, such as during bilateral talks with Prime Minister Jan Jambon of Flanders (Belgium) in July 2023 and during the Suriname Business Forum in New York in September 2023. In July 2024, SITA signed a memorandum of understanding for cooperation with the Suriname-Guyana Chamber of Commerce.

== Establishment ==
SITA functions as the investment arm of the Surinamese government. It was established at the end of 2021 as the successor to Investsur and IDCS, which had not successfully taken off under previous governments. For the establishment of SITA, work was done on a new and expectedly more efficient framework. In March 2022, a delegation from the Agência Brasileira de Promoção de Exportações e Investimentos (ApexBrasil) was present to assist in the establishment of SITA. This cooperation came about following President Jair Bolsonaro's state visit to Suriname in January 2022. In April 2022, the Caribbean Export Development Agency (CEDA) also visited Suriname to provide technical assistance to SITA.

== See also ==
- Economy of Suriname
- Foreign relations of Suriname
