= Jan Kolhoe =

Surinamese politician

Johan Somaroe (Jan) Kolhoe (c. 1918–2003/04) was a member of the Estates of Suriname in the 1950s and 1960s.

Kolhoe attended the Paulus school and then embarked on a career in education. From 1941 to 1950 he was a teacher in Curaçao and after that he was a school principal in the district of Nickerie. At the 1955 Surinamese general election he was a shadow candidate for the VHP and three years later the two seats in the Estates of Suriname for the Nickerie district went to the NOP members Poetoe and Kolhoe. At the 1963 elections, he unsuccessfully ran for Action Front in the Saramacca district and in 1973 the same happened when he was an NPS candidate at that district. Kolhoe became chief inspector of education after he retired. In 1974, Kolhoe was made knight in the Order of Orange Nassau.

Kolhoe died in 2003 or 2004.
