= Wonnie Boedhoe =

Surinamese politician and economist

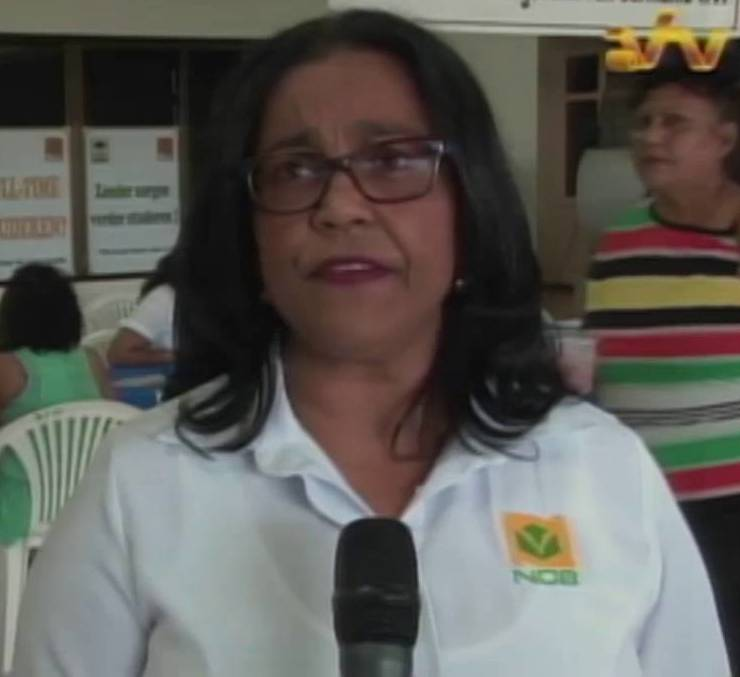
- Bodhoe in 2016

Minister of Finance
- In office 12 August 2010 – 10 June 2011
- President: Dési Bouterse
- Preceded by: Humphrey Hildenberg
- Succeeded by: Adelien Wijnerman

Personal details
- Occupation: Politician; economist

Wonnie Boedhoe is a Surinamese economist and politician who was Minister of Finance from 2010 until 2011 and director of the National Development Bank until 2019.

== Biography ==
Wonnie Boedhoe worked as director of the National Development Bank (NOB). On 12 August 2010, she became Minister of Finance in the first Bouterse cabinet. As minister, she inherited an opaque accounting system from the third Venetiaan cabinet. In March 2011 she dismissed Surpost director Carlo Godlieb due to financial irregularities.

Boedhoe resigned on 10 June 2011 and was succeeded by Adelien Wijnerman. Although she said that her resignation was for personal reasons, it had occurred amidst reports of disagreements within the government involving her. She was non-partisan when she took office as Minister of Finance.

Following her resignation as minister, Boedhoe remained as director of the NOB. In February 2019, the Supervisory Board (RvC) suspended her as NOB director after she had signed a collective agreement with a 12% wage increase without the permission of the RvC, which had opposed it due to potential financial issues with the NOB.

Boedhoe is a former chair of the Economist Association Suriname. In April 2021, Boedhoe became chair of the National Wage Council, created by minister Rishma Kuldipsingh to advise the government on the introduction of a minimum wage; she was renewed as chair in April 2023. In April 2024, she became part of Gi Sranan, a group of economists who provide free training to people planning to work in the Surinamese government. In September 2024, she published an analysis of the Ministry of Justice and Police budget, particularly the economic costs of crime.
