= Suriname-Guyana Chamber of Commerce =

- Suriname-Guyana Kamer van Koophandel
- Abbreviation: SGCC
- Formation: 24 February 2024
- Website: surguychamber.org

The Suriname-Guyana Chamber of Commerce (SGCC) is an international chamber of commerce that is aiming at strengthening the economic ties between Suriname and Guyana. The SGCC was lanced on 24 February 2024.

On 30 August 2023 the SGCC held its first, virtual stakeholders meeting with representatives from Surinamese and Guyanese companies. The meeting was organized by Henna Soerdjoesing, the director of the Surinamese ministry Foreign Affairs, International Business and International Cooperation (BIBIS). Some of the other attendees were Surinamese minister of Foreign Affairs, Albert Ramdin, and Guyanese ambassador Virjanand Depoo. On 3 January 2024 Rahul Lildhar was presented as chief executive officer (CEO).

Next to bi-national trade relations, the SGCC promotes trade relations of both countries at foreign venues, like in May 2024 in Houston, Texas, at the Offshore Technology Conference (OTC). At the inaugural bi-national trade event from 5 to 9 June 2024, Paramaribo hosts the biggest Guyanese trade delegation ever. In July 2024, the government's financing arm, the Suriname Investment and Trade Agency (SITA), signed a memorandum of understanding for cooperation with the Suriname-Guyana Chamber of Commerce.

== See also ==
- Economy of Guyana and of Suriname
- List of company registers
- Chamber of Commerce and Factories
- Ghana-Suriname Chamber of Commerce
- Suriname-India Chamber of Commerce and Industry
- Suriname-Netherlands Chamber of Commerce
