= Suriname-India Chamber of Commerce and Industry =

Suriname India Chamber of Commerce and Industry
- Abbreviation: SICCI
- Formation: 4 May 2018; 8 years ago

The Suriname India Chamber of Commerce and Industry (SICCI) is an international, semi-governmental chamber of commerce that is aiming at strengthening the economic ties between Suriname and India, and for the long term between the Caribbean region and India.

It was founded on 4 May 2018 at the Indian cultural establishment of Lalla Rookh in Paramaribo, with the attendance of the Surinamese Vice-president Ashwin Adhin and Minister of Trade and Industry Stephen Tsang, and the Indian ambassador Satendar Kumar. The memorandum of understanding was signed on 9 March 2018 on the Surinamese embassy in New Delhi in India by delegates of SICCI and the Indian Confederation of Indian Industry (CII), with the attendance of the Surinamese ambassador Aashna Kanhai.

SICCI is greatly focused on recruiting Indian companies for establishments in Suriname in accordance with five projects in the fields of solar energy, ICT, food and agriculture, and to participate in a star-up centre and a centre of expertise.

In October 2018 SICCI ran a pavilion for India on the United Caribbean Business Fair in Paramaribo.

== See also ==
- Economy of India and of Suriname
- List of company registers
- Chamber of Commerce and Factories
- Ghana-Suriname Chamber of Commerce
- Suriname-Guyana Chamber of Commerce
- Suriname-Netherlands Chamber of Commerce
