= Mining industry of Suriname =

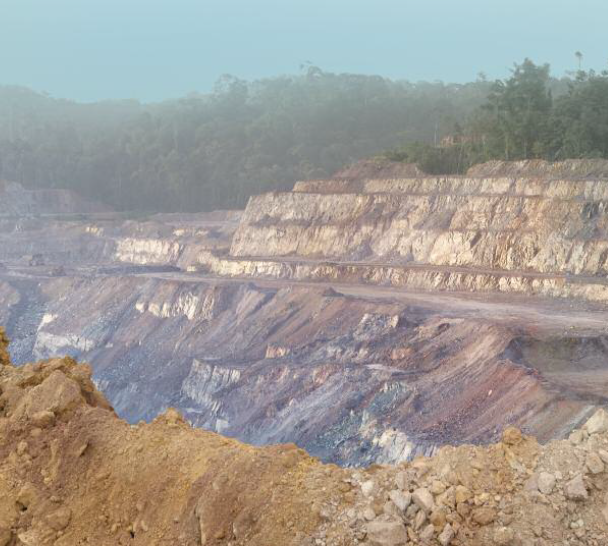
Rosebel Mine in Suriname.

The mineral industry of Suriname makes up a large proportion of the country's economy. In 1916, the Aluminium Company of America began mining bauxite in the then Dutch colony of Surinam which over time became Suriname's main export.

Gold and petroleum contributed to nearly 67% of the country’s total exports in 2017. The mining industry accounts for about 85% of exports and 25% of government revenues. Gold mining is controversial due to the impact of Indigenous people.

== Gold mining ==
There is one large scale gold mine operating in Suriname. This is the Rosebel Gold Mine. Development of a second large scale mine called the Merian Gold Project was approved by the government of Suriname on June 7, 2013. This mining project would be a partnership of Newmont Mining Corporation and Alcoa World Alumina and Chemicals. Merian is about 60 kilometres (40 mi) south of the town of Moengo on the Marowijne River. The government estimates there are another 20,000 small scale operators. Only 115 of these were registered by the government in 2009. The government calls these people porknokkers. Because of unemployment in Suriname, some local people turn to small, illegal gold mining as their source of incomes. Gold mining, especially the large and increasing scale of illegal gold mining with mercury, has caused extensive environmental damage to the country, and to its neighbor, French Guiana.

=== Commission for the Ordering of the Gold Mining Sector ===
Establishment of Ordening Goudsector (OGS)

Commission for the Ordering of the Gold Mining Sector (OGS) was established by the government in 2010. OGS is leading the reform effort to develop sustainable and environmentally responsible gold mining practices and transform informal small-scale gold mining into a viable sub-sector of the mining and national economy of Suriname.

Ban on mercury use in small-scale mining

Suriname does not produce chemical mercury and only allows mercury imports with a license. Since the 1990s these licenses were not issued anymore. Moreover, all licenses are used for mercury imports for medical use or research. Therefore, trade and import in mercury is illegal. Mercury is used in the small-scale gold mining because smuggling made mercury available. However people who are caught with mercury in their possession will be judged and/or fined.

Foreign investment

On April 13, 2013, the government reached an agreement with multinational IAMGOLD to increase investment in Suriname.

Kaloti Mint House Suriname

On March 1, 2013, Kaloti Mint House Suriname laid its funding stone and is expected to start its refinery production by the first quarter of 2014. Kaloti Mint House will be instrumental in producing "clean gold" in Suriname. Kaloti Mint House have been awarded the ISO 9001:2000 certification for gold and bullion manufacturing and ISO 14001 Environmental Certification. The company is presently applying for ISO 14025 for the Assaying of Gold and Silver. Kaloti will focus on melting and producing gold bars to international standards (999.9 purity) for local and international markets.

Minamata Treaty

In October 2013, the United Nations wanted to adopt the Minamata Treaty to ban the user of mercury altogether in Suriname.

The School of Mining

The Government of Suriname initiated a training unit within the Ordening Goudsector called the School of Mining. This training unit consists of 14 teachers. The teacher's training started February 2013 and is aimed at preparing them for the fieldwork. The duties of the teachers will be to provide hands-on training on the goldfields to small-scale gold miners. The teachers begin with prospecting and showing the small-scale miners more efficient ways to mine in their areas. Along the way they promote mercury free production methods. The Management of Ordening Goudsector hypothesizes that showing small-scale gold miners the benefits of new production methods will be the incentive itself to start the training programs.

Entrepreneurial Credit Fund

The Ministry of Finance initiated a credit fund in March 2013 for small and medium scale entrepreneurs. Small-scale miners can become formally verified entrepreneurs as the piece of land will be viewed as a formal "title" by financial institutes. This means the miners will be eligible for credits and thus can acquire credit to upscale their production. A first amount of 35 million SRD (US$10.69 million, as of Monday, Apr 8, 2013, 04:15 PM GMT) is available for credit through the Central Bank.

Mining zones

The Mining Law says that one can only mine with a license from the Government. Ordening Goudsector regulates the concessionaires, how many machine owners there are and what the movements of small-scale miners are. New mining areas are still being issued. However, data show that the interesting area to mine, especially for the small-scale miners who look for alluvial gold, is the Greenstone belt. The greenstone runs from Guyana, through Suriname, into French Guiana. This greenstone belt, however, only counts for 15% of the Surinamese surface. At the moment almost all areas in this belt are already given out in concessions.

== Bauxite ==
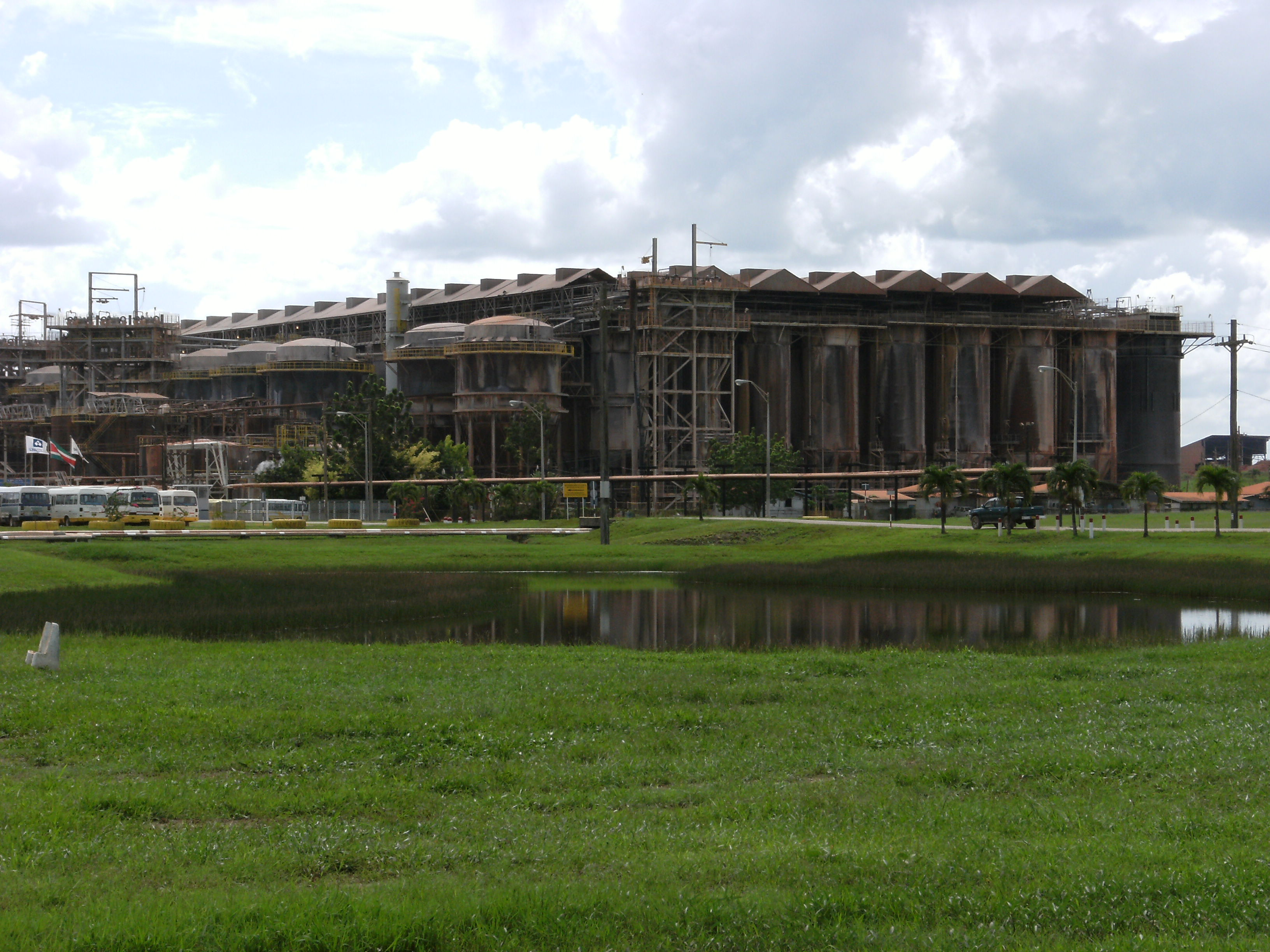
Suralco bauxite refinery in the town of Paranam in 2008

The mining of bauxite in Suriname has been known since 1915 and its export dates back to 1922, with the start of its exploitation by the American company Alcoa. Suriname's production was 280,000 tonnes, on average, before 1939, and it reached 2,699,000 tonnes in 1951, eight times more, then 3,421,000 in 1954 and 3,377,000 in 1957. The strategic nature of this resource allowed Suriname to benefit from the protection of the United States during World War II, and to attract investments from large companies such as Shell, BHP and Alcoa.

Afobaka Dam was built between 1961 and 1964 on the Suriname River to produce energy for the electrolysis process for the production of aluminium from bauxite at the Suralco alumina refinery which was managed by Alcoa from 1965 to 2017.

== Iron ==
To a lesser extent compared to other minerals, Suriname also produces iron.

== Hydrocarbons ==
In January 2020, the French and American oil companies Total and Apache announced that they had made a major discovery of oil and gas off the coast of Suriname. In September 2020, US Secretary of State Mike Pompeo visited Suriname to discuss the country's oil potential, meets with and congratulates new President Chan Santokhi, and touted U.S. companies facing competition from China to exploit the country's natural resources.

== Controversies ==
Illegal mining is a large problem in Suriname.
