= Armand Zunder =

Surinamese economist

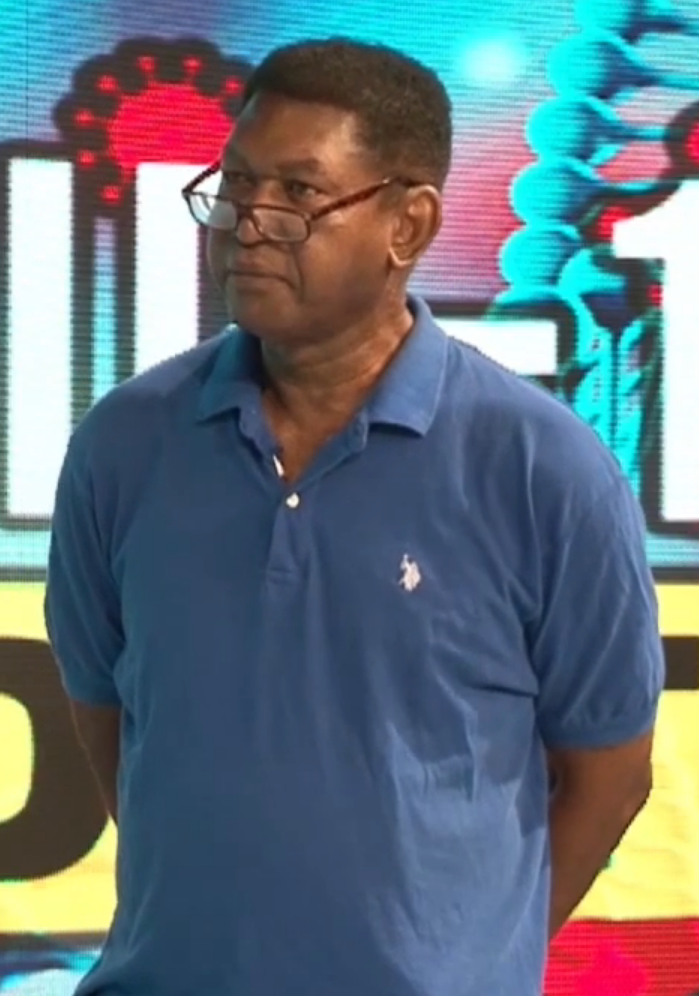
Armand Zunder in 2020

Armand Zunder (born 14 April 1946 in Paramaribo) is a Surinamese economist. As chairman of the Committee Reparations Slavery Past he was part of a reparations for slavery effort directed at the Netherlands. In 2020, Zunder became president of the Taxation Office.
