= Surinamese dollar =

Currency of Suriname

Surinaamse dollar (Dutch)
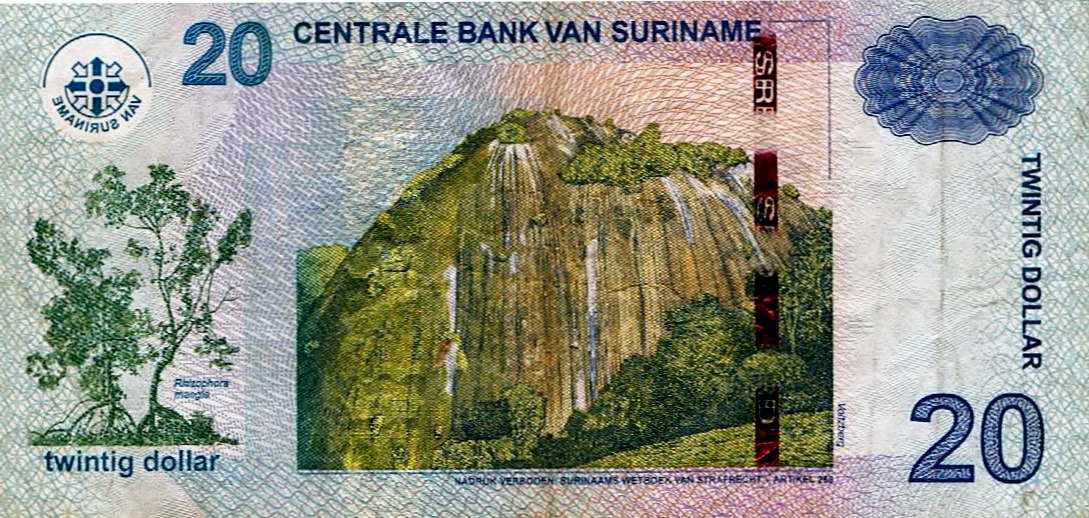
20 dollar note
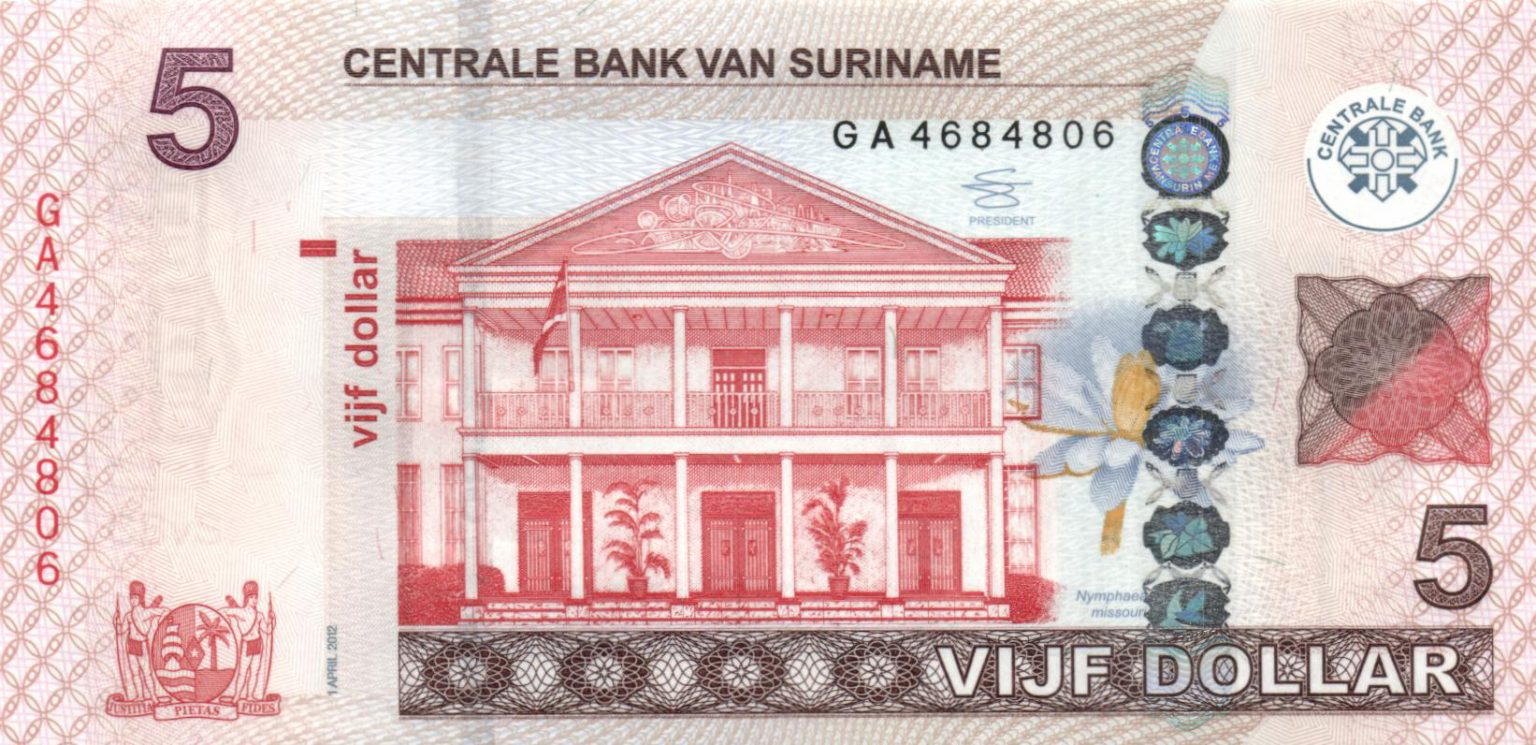
5 dollar note

ISO 4217
- Code: SRD (numeric: 968)
- Subunit: 0.01

Units of account
- Plural: dollar
- Symbol: $, Sur$
- Subunit
- 1/100: cent
- Plural
- cent: cent

Denominations
- Banknotes: 1, 2 1/2, 5, 10, 20, 50, 100, 200, 500 dollar
- Coins: 1, 5, 10, 25, 100, 250 cent

Demographics
- Date of introduction: 1 January 2004
- Replaced: Surinamese guilder
- User(s): Suriname

Issuance
- Central bank: Central Bank of Suriname
- Website: www.cbvs.sr

Valuation
- Inflation: 62.1% (Feb 2022)

The Surinamese dollar (ISO 4217 code SRD; Sranan Tongo: Sranandala) has been the currency of Suriname since 2004. It is divided into 100 cent. The Surinamese dollar is normally abbreviated with the dollar sign $, or alternatively Sr$ to distinguish it from other dollar-denominated currencies. In spoken Surinamese Dutch, it is widely referred to by its acronym SRD (Dutch: [ˌɛsɛrˈdeː]), with "dollar" generally being understood as meaning the US dollar.

== History ==
The dollar replaced the Surinamese guilder on 1 January 2004, with one dollar equal to 1,000 guilders. Initially, only coins were available, with banknotes delayed until mid-February, reportedly due to a problem at the printer, the Canadian Bank Note Company.

The old coins denominated in cents (i.e. 1/100 guilder) were declared to be worth their face value in the new cents, negating the necessity of producing new coins. Thus, for example, an old 25-cent coin, previously worth 1/4 guilder, was now worth 1/4 dollar (equivalent to 250 guilders). The rebasing of coins explicitly did not apply to commemorative coins.

Amendment 121 of ISO 4217 gave the currency the code SRD replacing the Suriname guilder (SRG).

The people of Suriname often refer to their currency as SRD to differentiate it from the US dollar, which is also used to quote prices for electronic goods, household furnishings and appliances, and automobiles.

The value of the Surinamese dollar (SRD) was set by the central bank rather than being market-based between 2004 and 2021. As a result, black market currency exchange thrived. The Central Bank of Suriname spent much of Suriname's foreign currency reserves supporting the official exchange rates as inflation and other factors caused the real value of the Surinamese dollar to decline against other reserve currencies. In June 2021, the central bank devalued the SRD by 33% and announced the currency would float freely. By June 2022, official exchange rates began to reflect the real floating exchange rate.

Historical official exchange rates of one U.S. dollar in Surinamese dollars

Period	Exchange rate
January 2005 – January 2011	2.70
January 2011 – November 2015	3.25
November 2015 – April 2016	4
April 2016 – September 2020	7.38
September 2020 – June 2021	14.15
June 2021 – June 2022	21
May 2023	37
May 2024	33.67
January 2025	35.10

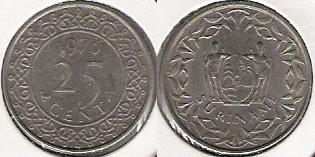
25 cent coin

== Coins ==
Coins in denominations of 1, 5, 10, 25, 100 and 250 cents from the previous currency are in circulation.

== Banknotes ==
The Surinamese dollar replaced the Surinamese guilder on 1 January 2004, with one dollar equal to 1,000 guilders, prompting the issuance of notes denominated in the new currency. On the notes, the currency is expressed in the singular, as is the Dutch custom. Banknotes come in denominations of 5, 10, 20, 50, and 100 SRD.

Government-issued "coin notes" (muntbiljetten) come in denominations of 1 and 2 1/2 SRD.

Years of high inflation have greatly reduced the purchasing power of the Surinamese dollar. To ease handling of cash, banknotes of 200 and 500 SRD were announced in August 2023 and introduced by the end of March 2024.

Current SRD exchange rates
From Google Finance:	AUD CAD CHF CNY EUR GBP HKD JPY USD BRL
From Yahoo! Finance:	AUD CAD CHF CNY EUR GBP HKD JPY USD BRL
From XE.com:	AUD CAD CHF CNY EUR GBP HKD JPY USD BRL
From OANDA:	AUD CAD CHF CNY EUR GBP HKD JPY USD BRL

== See also ==
- Economy of Suriname
- Central banks and currencies of the Caribbean
- Guyanese dollar

Surinamese dollar
Preceded by: Surinamese guilder Reason: inflation Ratio: 1 dollar = 1,000 guilders	Currency of Suriname; 1 January 2004 –	Succeeded by: Current
