= Embassy of Suriname, The Hague =

Embassy of Suriname in The Hague
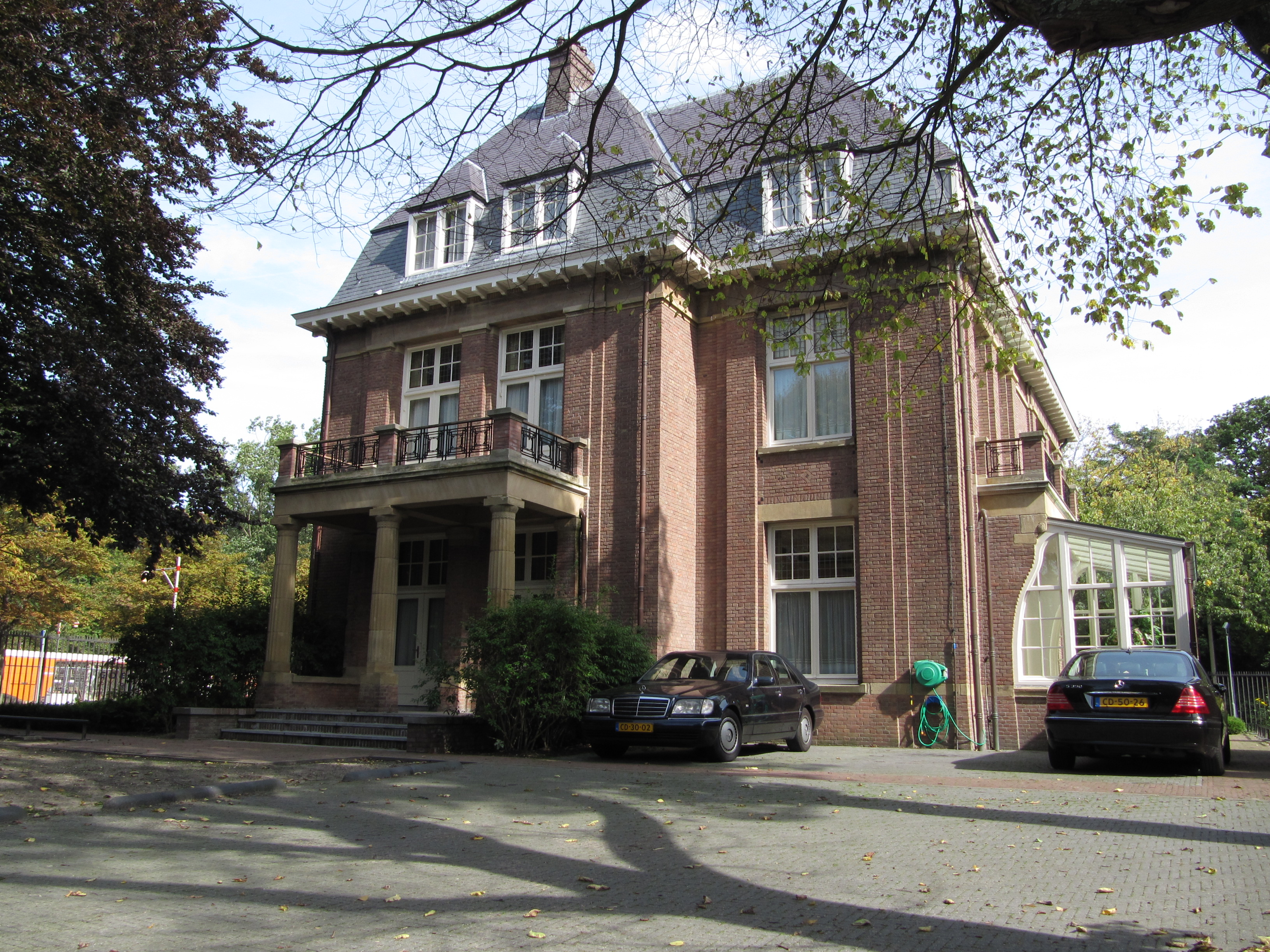
- Surinamese embassy
- Location: The Hague
- Address: 2 Alexander Gogelweg
- Coordinates: 52.0875°N 4.286389°E
- Opened: 25 November 1975

The Embassy of Suriname in The Hague is located at 2 Alexander Gogelweg.

The diplomatic post became effective upon Suriname's independence on 25 November 1975. This was achieved by converting the Surinamese cabinet in The Hague into an embassy. The day after, during an official ceremony, the Surinamese flag was raised at the front of the building.

In addition to the embassy, Suriname has consulates-general in Amsterdam and Willemstad, Curaçao, and honorary consulates in Breda and Nijkerk.

The Suriname-Netherlands Chamber of Commerce is located in the embassy, making it possible to establish a business in Suriname while in the Netherlands.
