= Gillmore Hoefdraad =

Surinamese economist and politician

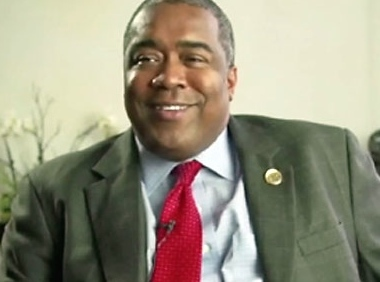

Minister of Finance of Suriname
- In office 2015–2020
- President: Desi Bouterse
- Preceded by: Andy Rusland
- Succeeded by: Armand Achaibersing

Governor of the Central Bank of Suriname
- In office 2010–2015
- Preceded by: André Telting
- Succeeded by: Glenn Gersie

Personal details
- Born: Gillmore André Hoefdraad; 17 December 1962 (age 63) Paramaribo, Suriname
- Education: University of Santiago de Cuba
- Chess career
- Country: United States
- Peak rating: 1953 (March 2024)

Gillmore André Hoefdraad (born 17 December 1962) is a Surinamese economist and politician. He was Governor of the Central Bank of Suriname from 2010 until 2015, and Ministry of Finance of Suriname from 2015 to 2020. In January 2020, it was reported that US$100 million was missing from the Central Bank. In July 2021, an Interpol red notice was issued for Hoefdraad, but it was later rescinded. Hoefdraad was sentenced in absentia to 12 years imprisonment on 17 December 2021.

== Biography ==
Hoefdraad was born on 17 December 1962 in Paramaribo. He is a chess player, and became national youth champion in 1978, 1979 and 1980. He studied economy at the University of Santiago de Cuba.

In 1988, Hoefdraad started working for the Central Bank of Suriname, and was a part-time lecturer at the Anton de Kom University. In 1991, he became a full-time professor. In 1999, he started working for the International Monetary Fund in Washington DC.

In 2010, Hoefdraad was appointed Governor of the Central Bank. In 2015, he was appointed Ministry of Finance of Suriname in the cabinet of Desi Bouterse. During his tenure, he took out 92 loans increasing the debt from SRD 9.2 billion to SRD 20.7 billion. In 2019, the Progressive Reform Party reported Hoefdraad to the Prosecutor General for exceeding the debt ceiling. On 1 November 2019, the National Assembly voted for a new law which no longer criminalised exceeding the debt ceiling.

In January 2020, it was reported that US$100 million was missing from the cash reserves of the Central Bank. Vice President Ashwin Adhin explained that the money was used to buy potatoes and onions.

In April 2021, the Prosecutor General filed a request to prosecute Hoefdraad for dubious transactions between the Central Bank and the Belgian company Clairfield. On 11 July, an Interpol red notice was issued for money laundering, embezzlement and corruption. On 23 July, an exit ban was issued. On 30 July, it was reported that he had been spotted in Skeldon, Guyana.

On 17 December 2021, Hoefdraad was sentenced in absentia to 12 years imprisonment and a fine of SRD 500,000. He was found guilty on violating the anti-corruption laws, misuse of state resources, participating in a criminal organisation, and embezzlement. On 24 December, an appeal was filed.

In May 2022, Interpol rescinded the red notice issued for Hoefdraad, issuing a statement confirming that Suriname's prosecution of Hoefdraad is politically motivated.
