= High Court of Justice of Suriname =

- Hof van Justitie van Suriname
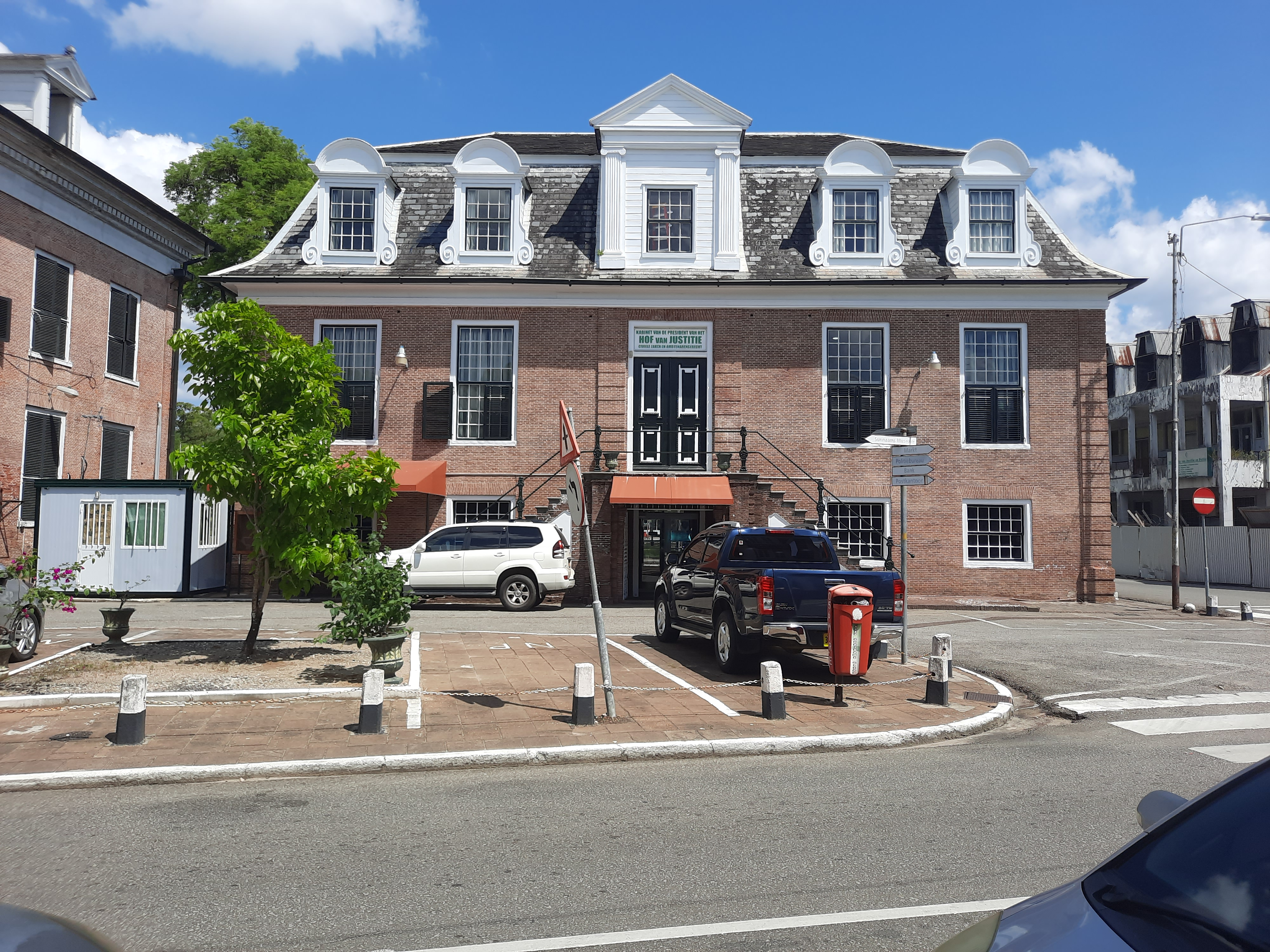
- The High Court of Justice of Suriname in Paramaribo

Acting President
- Currently: Iwan Rasoelbaks
- Since: 2014

The High Court of Justice of Suriname (Dutch: Hof van Justitie van Suriname) is the highest court of law in Suriname and is the head of the judicial branch.

Whilst the High Court of Justice is the highest court of appeal, cases beyond the court can be referred on to the Caribbean Court of Justice.

Iwan Rasoelbaks has been acting president of the High Court of Justice since 31 March 2014.
