= Surinamese guilder =

Former currency of Suriname (1940–2004)

Surinaamse gulden (Dutch)
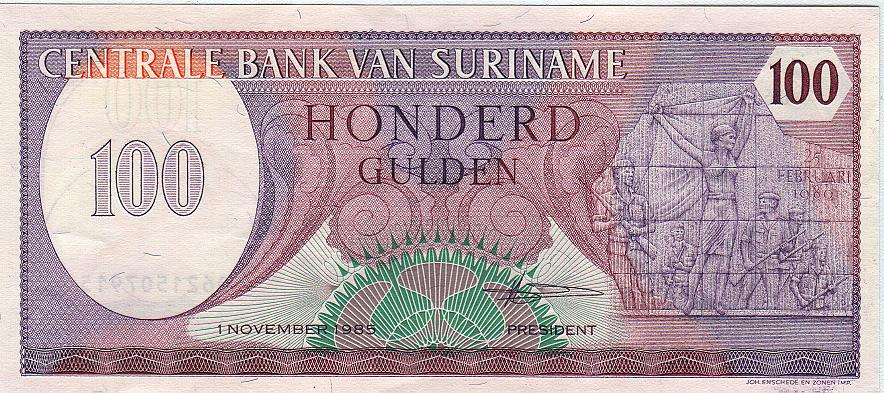
100 guilder of 1985
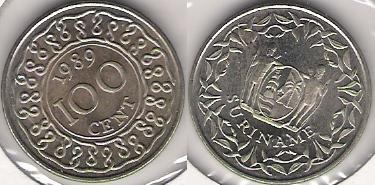
1 guilder or 100 cents

ISO 4217
- Code: SRG

Units of account
- Plural: guilders
- Symbol: ƒ or Sf. or fl
- Subunit
- 1/100: cent
- Plural
- cent: cents

Denominations
- Banknotes: 5, 10, 25, 100, 500, 1,000, 5,000, 10,000, 25,000 guilder
- Coins: 1, 5, 10, 25, 100, 250 cents

Demographics
- Replaced by: Surinamese dollar
- User(s): Suriname

Issuance
- Central bank: Centrale Bank van Suriname
- Website: www.cbvs.sr

Valuation
- Inflation: 23%
- Source: The World Factbook (archived), 2003 est.
- This infobox shows the latest status before this currency was rendered obsolete.

The guilder (Dutch: gulden; ISO 4217 code: SRG) was the currency of Suriname until 2004, when it was replaced by the Surinamese dollar. It was divided into 100 cents. Until the 1940s, the plural in Dutch was cents, with centen appearing on some early paper money, but after the 1940s the Dutch plural became cent.

== History ==
The Surinamese guilder was initially at par with the Dutch guilder. In 1940, following the German invasion and occupation of the Netherlands, the currency (along with the Netherlands Antillean guilder) was pegged to the U.S. dollar at a rate of 1.88585 guilders = 1 dollar.

The Surinamese guilder began to lose value from high inflation in the beginning of the 1980s, when a currency black market emerged. It was replaced by the Surinamese dollar on 1 January 2004 at a rate of 1 dollar = 1,000 guilders. To save cost of manufacturing, coins of less than 5 guilders (all denominated in cents) were made legal for their face value in the new currency. Thus, these coins increased their nominal value by a thousandfold overnight.

== Coins ==
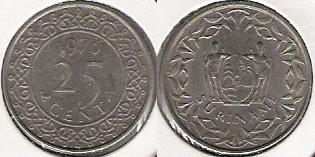
Coin of 25 cents from 1976

Until 1942, Dutch coins circulated in Suriname. Starting that year, coins were minted in the United States for use in Netherlands Guiana, some of which also circulated in the Netherlands Antilles. These coins were in denominations of 1, 5, 10 and 25 cents.

In 1962, coins were introduced bearing the name Suriname for the first time. These were in denominations of 1, 5, 10 and 25 cents and 1 guilder. The 1 cent was bronze, the 5-cent nickel-brass, the 10 and 25 cents were cupro-nickel and the 1 guilder was silver. Aluminium 1 and 5 cent coins were introduced in 1974 and 1976. In 1987, copper-plated steel replaced aluminium in the 1 and 5 cent coins and cupro-nickel 100 and 250 cent coins were introduced.

== Banknotes ==
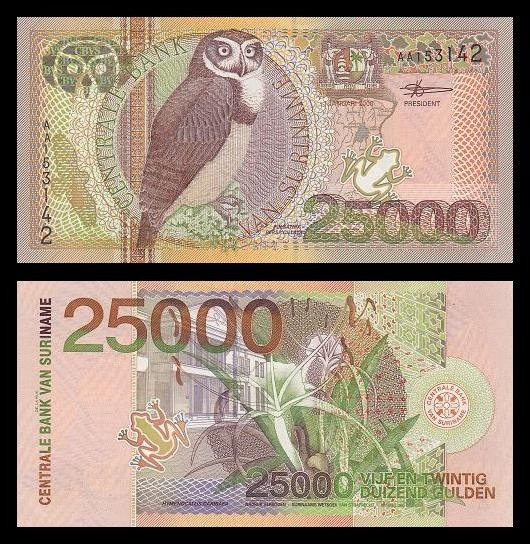
Banknote of 25,000 guilders of the final series of the Surinamese guilder.

In 1826, the Algemene Nederlandsche Maatschappij (General Netherlands Company) issued 1/2 and 3 guilder notes. These were followed in 1829 by notes of the West Indies Bank in denominations of 1/2, 1, 2, 3, 5, 10 and 50 guilders. The Bank introduced 10, 15 and 25 centen and 25 guilder notes in 1837, followed by 100, 200 and 300 guilder notes in 1865.

The Surinaamsche Bank introduced 50 guilder notes in 1901, followed by 10 guilders in 1915, 200 guilders in 1925, 50 guilders in 1926, 100 guilders in 1927, 5 guilders in 1935, 2 1/2 guilders in 1940, 25 guilders in 1941, 1000 guilders in 1943 and 300 guilders in 1948. The government issued silver certificates (zilverbonnen) between 1918 and 1920 for 1/2, 1 and 2 1/2 guilders. Further issues for 50 cents and 1 guilder were introduced in 1940. The 50-cent coin was issued until 1942, with 2 1/2 guilders being introduced in 1950. The silver certificates were superseded in 1960 by muntbiljet for 1 and 2 1/2 guilders, which were issued until 1985.

In 1957, the Central Bank of Suriname took over paper money production, issuing notes for 5, 10, 25, 100 and 1,000 guilders. Five-hundred-guilder notes were introduced in 1982, followed by 250 guilders in 1988. Two-thousand-guilder notes were introduced in 1995, followed by 5,000 and 10,000 guilders in 1997 and 25,000 guilders in 2000.

The last series of banknotes was introduced in 2000 in denominations of 5, 10, 25, 100, 500, 1,000, 5,000, 10,000 and 25,000 guilders. This colorful issue has native birds on the fronts and native flowers on the backs.

== See also ==
- Economy of Suriname

Surinamese guilder
| Preceded by: Dutch guilder Ratio: at par | Currency of Suriname – 31 December 2003 | Succeeded by: Surinamese dollar Reason: inflation Ratio: 1 dollar = 1,000 guilders |
