= De Surinaamsche Bank =

Largest bank in Suriname

De Surinaamsche Bank N.V.
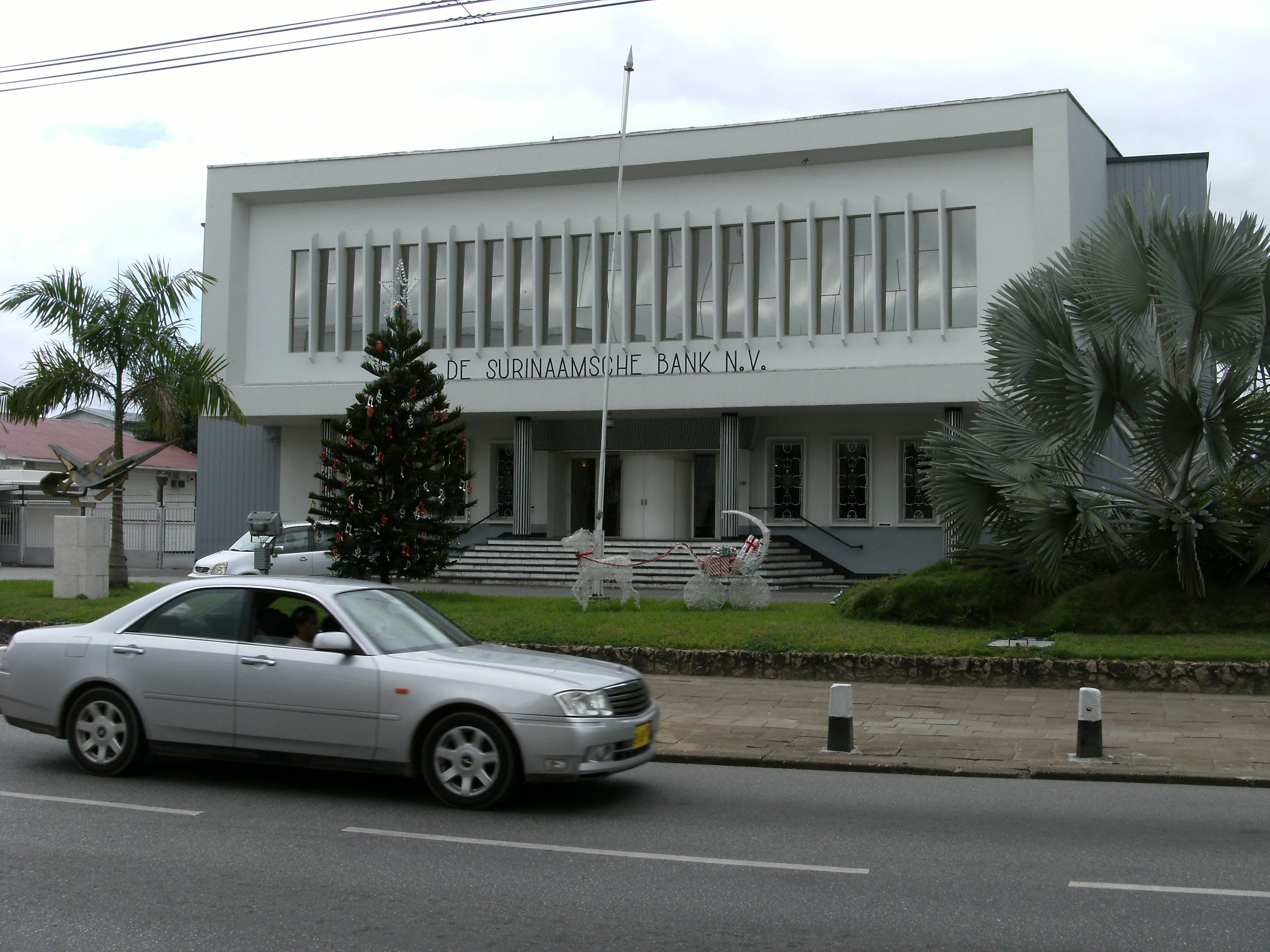
- Company type: Subsidiary
- Industry: Finance
- Founded: 1865; 161 years ago by the Nederlandsche Handel-Maatschappij
- Headquarters: Paramaribo, Suriname
- Products: Commercial banking, Investment banking, Private banking
- Parent: Nederlandsche Handel-Maatschappij
- Website: www.dsb.sr

De Surinaamsche Bank (DSB; Bank of Suriname in English) is the largest bank in Suriname. It provides retail banking products such as transaction accounts, loans, mortgagees and credit and debit cards as well as business loans.

== History ==
Simon Abendanon founded De Surinaamsche Bank (DSB) on 19 January 1865, in Paramaribo, and it opened for business on 18 July 1865, in the home of one of the founders, pending construction of its own building. The bank’s headquarters remained in Amsterdam though. Abendanon was a captain and court bailiff in Suriname. After the abolition of slavery in 1863, there was a period of monetary chaos, and Abendanon saw an opportunity in creating a bank that would issue bank-notes and use the funds to finance trade. After its founding in 1826, the Nederlandsche Handel-Maatschappij issued banknotes. And then between 1828–1848, the West-Indische Bank issued banknotes for the Dutch West Indies.

The next organizational landmark occurred in 1948, when Nederlandsche Handel-Maatschappij acquired DSB. Three years later, Nederlandsche Handel-Maatschappij, which owned all the shares of DSB, transferred DSB’s headquarters to Paramaribo. In 1957, DSB formally gave up its right to issue notes to the newly formed Central Bank of Suriname.

In 1964, Nederlandsche Handel-Maatschappij merged with De Twentsche Bank to form Algemene Bank Nederland (ABN), and the ownership of DSB transferred to the new bank. However, in 1977, the government of the Surinam Republic nostrified DSB. The government took 10% of the shares and required that the bank sell 41% to the public. ABN retained a minority position of 49%.

In 2001, ABN AMRO sold its 49% holding in DSB to Assuria N.V. Assuria already owned 5.6% of DSB so the purchase gave it majority control. In 2006, the bank became involved in a scandal because the director and his predecessor were accused of illegal financial transactions.

In 2016, the bank suffered a major loss, partly due to irresponsibly large loans to the Surinamese government. In November 2017, the Central Bank of Suriname warned of a bank run on De Surinaamsche Bank. A week earlier, the CBvS called on fellow banks to deposit money in an emergency fund to keep the DSB afloat. This was followed by more alarming publications about the financial situation at the bank in the press. DSB customers err on the side of caution and withdraw their money from the bank.
