= Central Bank of Suriname =

State-owned bank in Suriname

Central Bank of Suriname Centrale Bank van Suriname
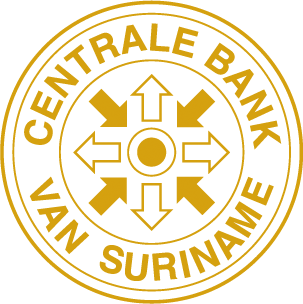

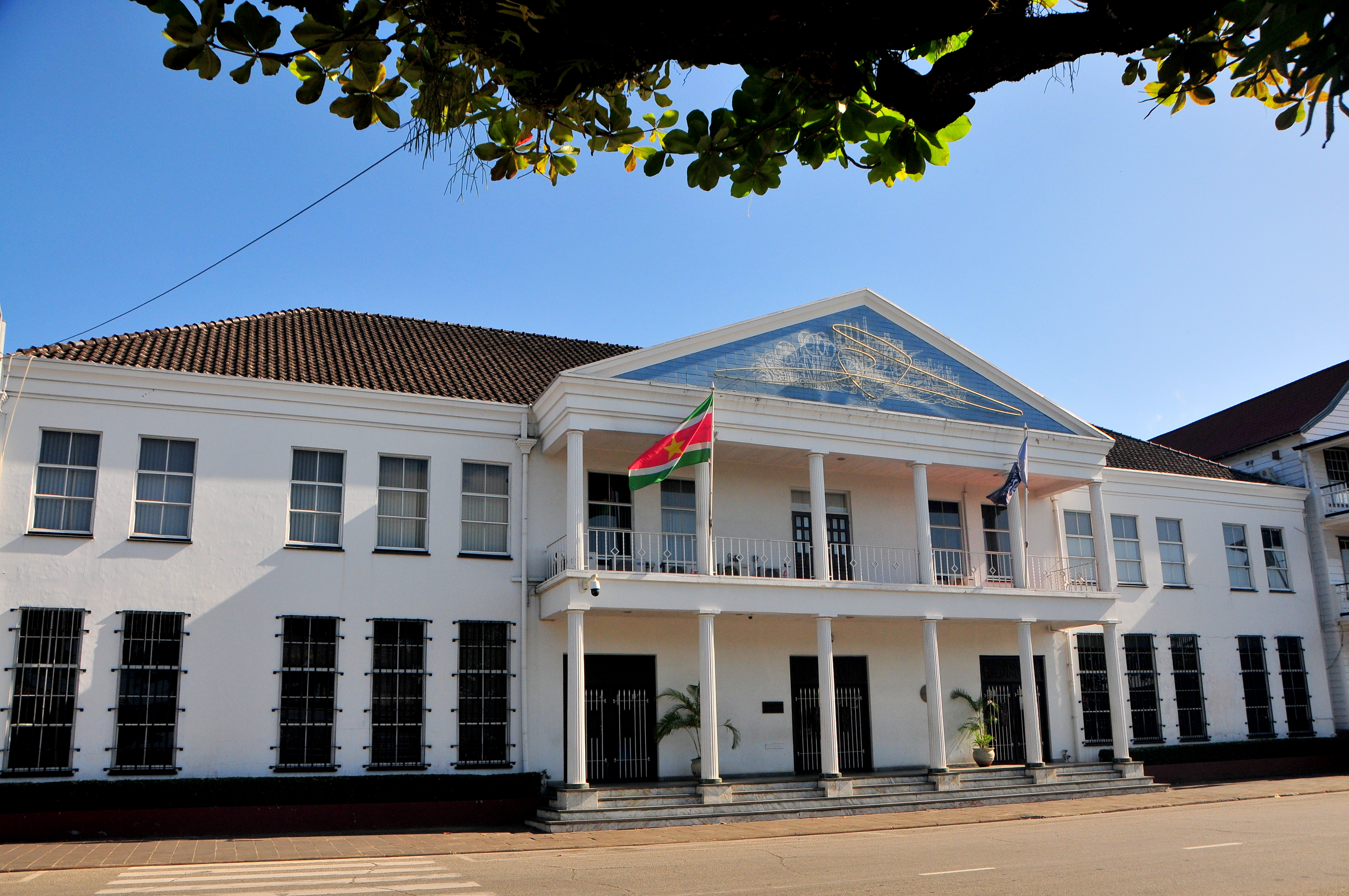
- The CBvS in 2022
- Headquarters: Waterkant, Paramaribo, Suriname
- Established: April 1, 1957
- Ownership: 100% state ownership
- Governor: Maurice Roemer
- Central bank of: Suriname
- Currency: Surinamese dollar SRD (ISO 4217)
- Reserves: 670 million USD
- Website: www.cbvs.sr

The Central Bank of Suriname (CBvS) (Dutch: Centrale Bank van Suriname) is Suriname’s highest monetary authority and the country’s governing body in monetary and economic affairs.

The Central Bank’s tasks were legislated in the Bank Act of 1956. Like other central banks, it is the principal monetary authority of the country. Other tasks include the promotion of the value and stability of the currency of Suriname, the provision of money circulation, the safeguarding of private banking and credit union activities, together with balanced socio-economic development.

The Central Bank is headed by a Governor and divided into three directorates: Banking Operations, Monetary and Economic Affairs and Supervision.

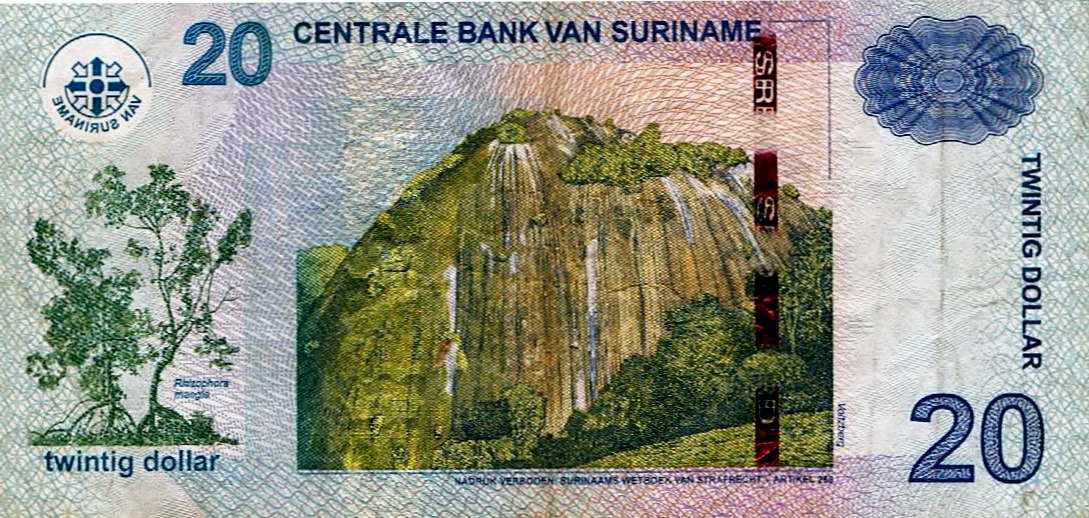
20 Surinamese dollars

== History ==
After the start of Suriname’s political self-government from the Netherlands in 1954, changes were instigated to the country’s monetary system; on 1 April 1957, the Central bank of Suriname was established in Paramaribo and took over the issuing of currency.

Until 1957, De Surinaamsche Bank (DSB), which at that time was a subsidiary of the Dutch Nederlandsche Handel-Maatschappij and the largest commercial bank in Suriname, acted as default issuer of currency.

== Governors ==
- Rudolf Groenman, April 1957 – October 1961
- Victor Max de Miranda, July 1963 – December 1980
- Jules Sedney, December 1980 – January 1983
- Henk Goedschalk, January 1985 – January 1994
- André Telting, March 1994 – December 1996
- Henk Goedschalk, January 1997 – August 2000
- André Telting, September 2000 – August 2010
- Gillmore Hoefdraad, September 2010 – August 2015
- Glenn Gersie, February 2016 – February 2019
- Robert-Gray van Trikt, March 2019 – January 2020
- Maurice Roemer, February 2020 –

== See also ==
- Surinamese dollar
- Economy of the Caribbean
- Economy of South America
- Economy of the Netherlands Antilles
- Netherlands Antillean gulden
- De Nederlandsche Bank
- Central Bank of Aruba
- Economy of Curaçao
- Dutch Caribbean Securities Exchange
- Central banks and currencies of the Caribbean
- List of central banks
- List of financial supervisory authorities by country
