= 1866 Surinamese general election =

General elections were held in Suriname for the first time in April 1866 following the creation of a partially elected Colonial States. The Colonial States consisted of nine elected members and four appointed by the Governor-General.

== Electoral system ==
The elections were held using the two-round system, with suffrage restricted to men who paid a tax contribution of 60 Dutch guilders. Voters had multiple votes, and any candidate receiving a number of votes equivalent to over 50% of the valid ballots cast was elected in the first round. If not all seats were filled, a second round was held with twice the number of candidates as seats remaining, who were the candidates who received the most votes but failed to be elected in the first round.

Elected members were to serve six-year terms, with one-third of members elected every two years. Following the first elections in 1866 to elect all nine members, three members would be elected in 1868.

Appointed members served for one year.

== Results ==
As there were 226 valid ballots cast, candidates required 114 votes to be elected in the first round. Four candidates were elected in the first round, with a run-off taking place between the next ten candidates.

Candidate	First round		Second round		Notes
Candidate	Votes	%	Votes	%	Notes
G.J.A. Bosch Reitz	156	69.03			Elected
E.F.L. Mollinger	152	67.26			Elected
B.E. Colaço Belmonte	146	64.60			Elected
Salomon Soesman Jr.	127	56.19			Elected
Daniel Benjamins	111	49.12	123	56.68	Elected
John James Hewitt	105	46.46	170	78.34	Elected
N.T.A. Arlaud	100	44.25	131	60.37	Elected
M.S. van Praag	92	40.71	94	43.32	
J.V. Bouguenon	88	38.94	110	50.69	Elected
Fergus Carstairs	84	37.17	102	47.00	Elected
Jacob Nicolaas Eckhardt de Mesquita	73	32.30	81	37.33	
Joseph Gustaaf van Emden	69	30.53	86	39.63	
Tjerk Jansen Eijken Sluijters	59	26.11	87	40.09	
Frederik Taunaij	57	25.22	61	28.11	
A.J. da Costa	45	19.91			
Francois Philemon Bouguenon	41	18.14			
J. Mauritsz Ganderheyden	41	18.14			
Simon Abendanon	38	16.81			
Abraham Wolff Oppenheimer	32	14.16			
Hugh Wright	32	14.16			
Samuel Bueno de Mesquita	30	13.27			
A.H. de Granada	27	11.95			
J.M.J.E. Sluijters	19	8.41			
F.H. van Affelen van Oorde	15	6.64			
Petrus Alma	14	6.19			
W.E.H. Winkels	12	5.31			
Jan Carel Telting	11	4.87			
A.G. van Son	11	4.87			
Henri Muller	11	4.87			
Karel Daniel Brakke	11	4.87			
Carl Reinhard Berner	11	4.87			
Thomas Tijndall	10	4.42			
Johannes Cornelis Muller	9	3.98			
J.H. Vernhout	8	3.54			
Semuel Henriques de Granada	8	3.54			
A. Dessé	7	3.10			
Lodewijk Carbin	6	2.65			
Johannis Philippus Haase Jr	6	2.65			
Hendrikus Hermanus Kramer	6	2.65			
François Daniel Daij	6	2.65			
Jacob Coenraad Gomperts	5	2.21			
Jacobus de Jong	5	2.21			
John Hilton Jackson	5	2.21			
G. Cruden	5	2.21			
Friedrich Boedinghaus	4	1.77			
Barend Christiaan van den Ende	4	1.77			
Jacob Gomperts	4	1.77			
Johann Heinrich Kruse	4	1.77			
L.G. Malmberg	4	1.77			
Johannis Hubertus Mertens	4	1.77			
Peter Christiaan Maij	4	1.77			
Wilhelm Eduard Ruhmann	4	1.77			
Hendrik Samuel Schouten	3	1.33			
J.M. Polak	3	1.33			
Paul René Planteau	3	1.33			
J.J.B. de Mesquita	3	1.33			
Abraham Daniel Fernandes	3	1.33			
A.M. Coster	3	1.33			
Henrieus Bijlaart	2	0.88			
J. Frouin	2	0.88			
J.W. Gefken	2	0.88			
M. Hutchinson	2	0.88			
Franco Petrus Kamerling	2	0.88			
James Delmonte Lijon	2	0.88			
Willem Johannis Gijsbertus Labad	2	0.88			
Duncan Munro	2	0.88			
D.J.C. O'Ferrall	2	0.88			
S. Soesman	2	0.88			
Thomas Godfried Smith	2	0.88			
Phoebus Hitzerus Verbeek	2	0.88			
Johan Philip Louis Weiman	2	0.88			
Bernat Ballin	1	0.44			
David Baëza	1	0.44			
Adriaan Hagoort van Borcharen	1	0.44			
James Harvie Cummings	1	0.44			
J. Colaço Belmonte	1	0.44			
Geradus Duijckinck	1	0.44			
J.M.A. Martini van Gelfen	1	0.44			
Hermanus van Genderen	1	0.44			
H.R. Gummels	1	0.44			
Samuel Louis Heijmans	1	0.44			
Jan Philippus Albertus Hoeffelman	1	0.44			
Johannus Herbert August Willem Baron van Heerdt	1	0.44			
Jaques David Juda	1	0.44			
A. von Konigslow	1	0.44			
Sallij Lijon	1	0.44			
Johan Lugard	1	0.44			
W. Meijer	1	0.44			
Alexander Mac Donald	1	0.44			
J.B. de Mesquita	1	0.44			
J. Petzoldt	1	0.44			
Fecke Poort	1	0.44			
Jacob van Praag	1	0.44			
F.A. Searle	1	0.44			
J.L. Stuger	1	0.44			
H. Sawijer	1	0.44			
Jacob Isac Spiering	1	0.44			
D.M. Uhlenkamp	1	0.44			
Michael de Veer	1	0.44			
Joël Benjamin Vos	1	0.44			
J.F. Saile Vanier	1	0.44			
Total	2,012	100.00	1,045	100.00	
Valid votes	226	99.12			
Invalid/blank votes	2	0.88			
Total votes	228	100.00			
Source: Surinaamsche courant

== Aftermath ==
Governor-General Reinhart Frans van Lansberge appointed Samuel Bueno de Mesquita, J. Mauritsz Ganderheyden, J.M.J.E. Sluijters and F.H. van Affelen van Oorde as the nominated members.

The newly elected Colonial States met for the first time on 8 May 1866. J. Mauritsz Ganderheyden was appointed chairman.

From the elected members, it was decided that Fergus Carstairs, B.E. Colaço Belmonte and J.J. Hewitt would serve until 1868, Daniel Benjamins, G.J.A. Bosch Reitz and N.T.A. Arlaud would serve until 1870, while E.F.L. Mollinger, J.V. Bouguenon and S. Soesman Jr would serve until 1872.

Mauritsz Ganderheyden resigned in 1867, after which S. Soesman Jr became chairman. Mauritsz Ganderheyden was replaced as a nominated member by Paul René Planteau.
