= 1870 Surinamese general election =

Partial general elections were held in Suriname in March and April 1870 to elect three of the nine elected members of the Colonial States.

== Electoral system ==
The Colonial States consisted of nine elected members and four appointed by the Governor-General. Elected members served six-year terms, with three members elected every two years. Following the first elections in 1866 to elect all nine members, three would serve until 1868, three until 1870 and three until 1872. The 1870 election was for the seats held by Daniel Benjamins, G.J.A. Bosch Reitz and N.T.A. Arlaud.

The elections were held using the two-round system, with suffrage restricted to men who paid a tax contribution of 60 Dutch guilders. Voters had multiple votes, and any candidate receiving a number of votes equivalent to over 50% of the valid ballots cast was elected in the first round. If not all seats were filled, a second round was held with twice the number of candidates as seats remaining, who were the candidates who received the most votes but failed to be elected in the first round.

== Results ==
As there were 159 valid ballots cast, candidates required 80 votes to be elected in the first round. Two candidates were elected in the first round, with a run-off taking place between the next two candidates for the third seat.

Candidate	First round		Second round		Notes
Candidate	Votes	%	Votes	%	Notes
Daniel Benjamins	115	72.33			Re-elected
G.J.A. Bosch Reitz	109	68.55			Re-elected
N.T.A. Arlaud	68	42.77	111	69.38	Re-elected
A.H. de Granada	55	34.59	49	30.63	
A.J. da Costa	36	22.64			
Semuel van Praag	17	10.69			
Eliazer Soesman	17	10.69			
M.S. van Praag	11	6.92			
Jacobus de Jong	10	6.29			
Simon Abendanon	4	2.52			
Philip Jacob Boas	3	1.89			
Francois Philemon Bouguenon	3	1.89			
Frederik Taunaij	3	1.89			
David Baëza	2	1.26			
Francois Daniel Daij	2	1.26			
Joseph Gustaaf van Emden	2	1.26			
Johannes Cornelis Muller	2	1.26			
Frederick Paul Penard	2	1.26			
Petrus Alma	1	0.63			
C. Baal	1	0.63			
Johannis Philippus Haase Jr	1	0.63			
John James Hewitt	1	0.63			
Franco Petrus Kamerling	1	0.63			
Hendrikus Hermanus Kramer	1	0.63			
G. Kraai	1	0.63			
James Delmonte Lijon	1	0.63			
Abraham Wolff Oppenheimer	1	0.63			
F.A. Sanches	1	0.63			
A.G. van Son	1	0.63			
Jan Carel Telting	1	0.63			
F. Vailee	1	0.63			
Paul Charles Vereul	1	0.63			
Johannes Jacobus Pierre Wessels	1	0.63			
Total	476	100.00	160	100.00	
Valid votes	159	99.38	160	99.38	
Invalid/blank votes	1	0.62	1	0.62	
Total votes	160	100.00	161	100.00	
Registered voters/turnout	218	73.39			
Source: Koloniaal nieuwsblad, De kolonist

== Aftermath ==
Governor-General Willem Hendrik Johan van Idsinga re-appointed the same four nominated members as had been serving in the outgoing States, Samuel Bueno de Mesquita, Cornelis Johannes Heylidy, Joël Benjamin Vos and Jasper Mauritsz Ganderheyden.

The newly elected States met for the first time on 10 May 1870, with Ganderheyden continuing to serve as chairman.

In May 1871 three of the nominated members – Bueno de Mesquita, Heylidy and Vos – were replaced by Phoebus Hitzerus Verbeek, J.A.T. Cohen Stuart and Wilhelm Eduard Ruhmann.

In August 1871 J.V. Bouguenon (who had been elected in 1866 and was up for re-election in 1872) was replaced by Johannes Cornelis Muller, who took his place in October 1871.
