= 1872 Surinamese general election =

Partial general elections were held in Suriname in March 1872 to elect three of the nine elected members of the Colonial States.

== Electoral system ==
The Colonial States consisted of nine elected members and four appointed by the Governor-General. Elected members served six-year terms, with three members elected every two years. Following the first elections in 1866 to elect all nine members, three would serve until 1868, three until 1870 and three until 1872. The 1872 election was for the seats won in 1866 by E.F.L. Mollinger, Salomon Soesman Jr. and J.V. Bouguenon, although only Mollinger was still a member by 1872 as Soesman had resigned in 1869 and been replaced by F.H. van Affelen van Oorde, while Bouguenon had resigned in 1871 and had been replaced by Johannes Cornelis Muller.

The elections were held using the two-round system, with suffrage restricted to men who paid a tax contribution of 60 Dutch guilders. Voters had multiple votes, and any candidate receiving a number of votes equivalent to over 50% of the valid ballots cast was elected in the first round. If not all seats were filled, a second round was held with twice the number of candidates as seats remaining, who were the candidates who received the most votes but failed to be elected in the first round.

== Results ==
As there were 100 valid ballots cast, candidates required 51 votes to be elected in the first round. For the first time since elections started in 1866, no second round was required. All three incumbents were re-elected.

Candidate	Votes	%	Notes
F.H. van Affelen van Oorde	79	79.00	Re-elected
E.F.L. Mollinger	73	73.00	Re-elected
Johannes Cornelis Muller	68	68.00	Re-elected
A.H. de Granada	18	18.00	
Semuel van Praag	15	15.00	
A.J. da Costa	13	13.00	
Petrus Alma	2	2.00	
Charles Busken Huet	2	2.00	
M.S. van Praag	2	2.00	
Samuel Bueno Bibaz	1	1.00	
Bosch Reitz	1	1.00	
Francois Philemon Bouguenoa	1	1.00	
Dr Dessé	1	1.00	
C.A.G. van Everdingen	1	1.00	
Ph. Heijmans	1	1.00	
Jacobus de Jong	1	1.00	
Hendrikus Hermanus Kramer	1	1.00	
Isak Morpurgo	1	1.00	
Henricus Gerhardus Carolus Muller	1	1.00	
David Juda	1	1.00	
A. Samuels	1	1.00	
Jacob Samuels	1	1.00	
Eliazer Soesman	1	1.00	
Eduard Joseph Sacoto Stuger	1	1.00	
Mozes Taytelbaum	1	1.00	
Joël Benjamin Vos	1	1.00	
W.E.H. Winkels	1	1.00	
Total	290	100.00	
Valid votes	100	98.04	
Invalid votes	1	0.98	
Blank votes	1	0.98	
Total votes	102	100.00	
Registered voters/turnout	167	61.08	
Source: De West-Indiër, Suriname

== Aftermath ==
Governor-General Willem Hendrik Johan van Idsinga re-appointed three of the four nominated members from the outgoing States (J.A.T. Cohen Stuart, Phoebus Hitzerus Verbeek and Jasper Mauritsz Ganderheyden), together with Jan Hendrik Gilquin.

The newly elected States met for the first time on 9 May 1872, with Ganderheyden continuing to serve as chairman.

In August 1872 J.A.T. Cohen Stuart resigned and was replaced by Jacobus de Jong. The following month elected member van Oorde was replaced by Semuel van Praag. In 1873 G.J.A. Bosch Reitz (whose term was due to end in 1876) was replaced by A.J. da Costa. Fergus Carstairs resigned the same year and was replaced by Johannes Cateau van Rosevelt. Mollinger resigned in April 1874 and was replaced by David Baëza.
