= 1868 Surinamese general election =

Partial general elections were held in Suriname in March and April 1868 to elect three of the nine elected members of the Colonial States.

== Electoral system ==
The Colonial States consisted of nine elected members and four appointed by the Governor-General. Elected members served six-year terms, with three members elected every two years. Following the first elections in 1866 to elect all nine members, three members would be elected in 1868, replacing the three members who had been chosen to serve two-year terms in the initial States (Fergus Carstairs, B.E. Colaço Belmonte and John James Hewitt). Appointed members served for one year.

The elections were held using the two-round system, with suffrage restricted to men who paid a tax contribution of 60 Dutch guilders. Voters had multiple votes, and any candidate receiving a number of votes equivalent to over 50% of the valid ballots cast was elected in the first round. If not all seats were filled, a second round was held with twice the number of candidates as seats remaining, who were the candidates who received the most votes but failed to be elected in the first round.

== Results ==
As there were 241 valid ballots cast, candidates required 121 votes to be elected in the first round. Two candidates were elected in the first round, with a run-off taking place between the next two candidates for the third seat.

Candidate	First round		Second round		Notes
Candidate	Votes	%	Votes	%	Notes
B.E. Colaço Belmonte	147	61.00			Re-elected
Fergus Carstairs	135	56.02			Re-elected
A.J. van Emden	78	32.37	139	61.78	Elected
Cornelis Johannes Heylidy	76	31.54	86	38.22	
F.H. van Affelen van Oorde	68	28.22			
M.S. van Praag	45	18.67			
A.H. de Granada	43	17.84			
Simon Abendanon	19	7.88			
Jacob Nicolaas Eckhardt de Mesquita	12	4.98			
David Juda	7	2.90			
A.J. da Costa	6	2.49			
Abraham Wolff Oppenheimer	6	2.49			
Gerardus Duijckink	6	2.49			
Eliazer Soesman	6	2.49			
Henricus Gerhardus Carolus Muller	5	2.07			
Jacobus de Jong	5	2.07			
Karel Daniel Brakke	5	2.07			
Francois Daniel Daij	4	1.66			
Joseph Gustaaf van Emden	4	1.66			
Petrus Alma	4	1.66			
Frederik Taunaij	4	1.66			
Johannes Cornelis Muller	3	1.24			
Samuel Bueno de Mesquita	2	0.83			
Carl Reinhard Berner	2	0.83			
Joël Benjamin Vos	2	0.83			
Phoebus Hitzerus Verbeek	2	0.83			
Jacob Ballin	2	0.83			
Paul René Planteau	2	0.83			
Semuel Henriques de Granada	1	0.41			
W.E.H. Winkels	1	0.41			
John James Hewitt	1	0.41			Unseated
R. Twiss	1	0.41			
Tijndall de Veer	1	0.41			
Johannis Hubertus Mertens	1	0.41			
Hendrikus Hermanus Kramer	1	0.41			
Severinus van Lierop	1	0.41			
Johannis Sander	1	0.41			
Evert Adolf van Emden	1	0.41			
Michael de Veer	1	0.41			
J.F. Saile Vanier	1	0.41			
Johannis Philippus Haase Jr	1	0.41			
Francois Philemon Bouguenon	1	0.41			
A. von Königslöw	1	0.41			
J. Mertens	1	0.41			
Total	716	100.00	225	100.00	
Valid votes	241	99.18			
Invalid/blank votes	2	0.82			
Total votes	243	100.00			
Source: Kolonial niewsblad, Surinaamsche courant, Utrechtsch provinciaal en stedelĳk

== Aftermath ==
Governor-General Willem Hendrik Johan van Idsinga re-appointed Samuel Bueno de Mesquita, Paul René Planteau and F.H. van Affelen van Oorde as nominated members, together with Cornelis Johannes Heylidy, who had lost in the second round runoff. Planteau was replaced by Jasper Mauritsz Ganderheyden in 1869.

The newly elected Colonial States met for the first time on 12 May 1868. Salomon Soesman Jr. continued as chairman until May 1869, when he resigned and was succeeded as chairman by Jasper Mauritsz Ganderheyden.

Having failed to be elected, F.H. van Affelen van Oorde resigned from his nominated seat in May 1868 and was replaced by Joël Benjamin Vos. However, he returned in May 1869, replacing elected member Salomon Soesman Jr.
