= Paramaribo =

Capital and largest city of Suriname

- Capital city
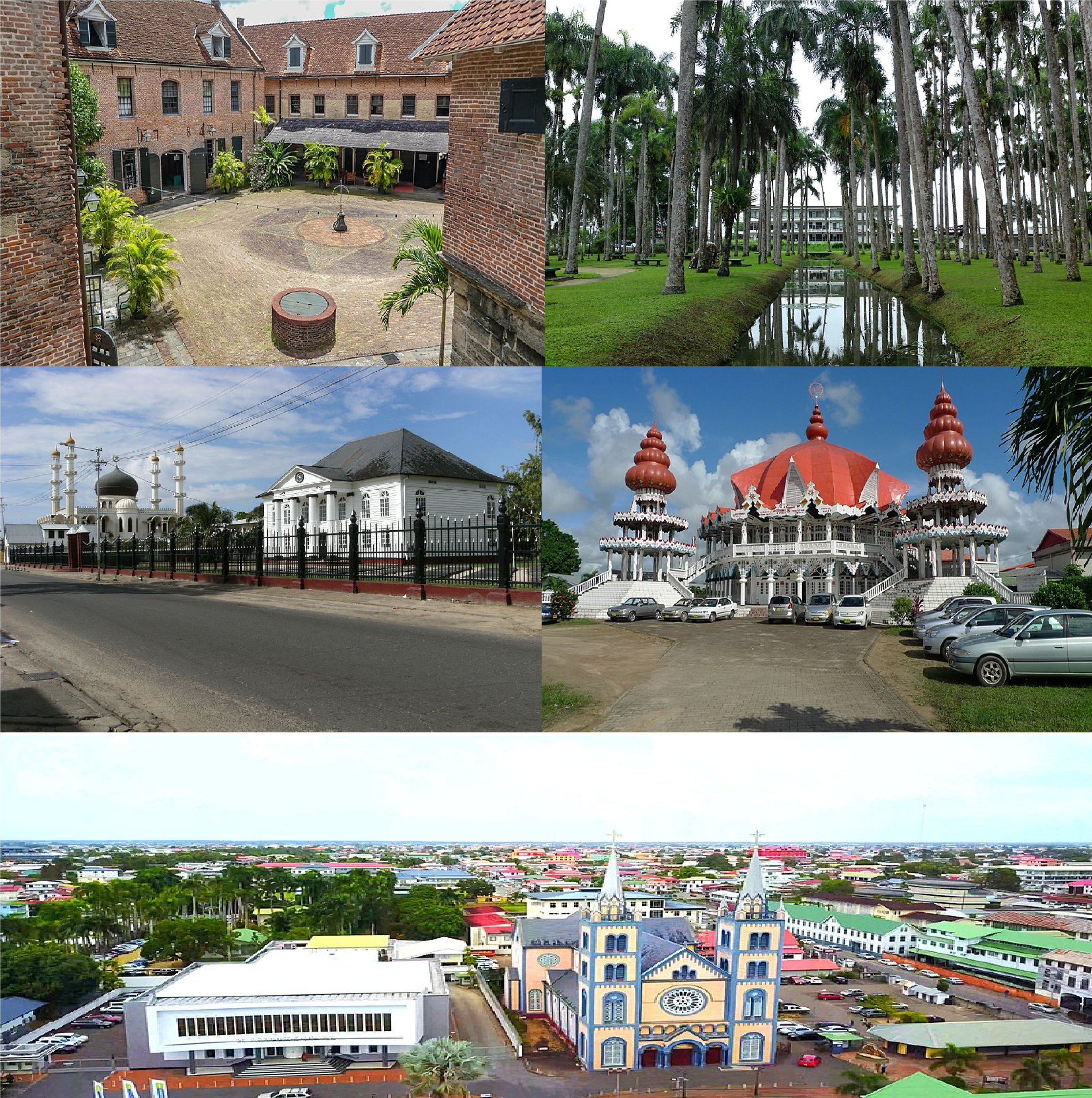
- Clockwise from left: Fort Zeelandia, Garden of Palms, Arya Diwaker, Saint Peter and Paul Cathedral and its surroundings, and Mosque Keizerstraat adjacent to the Neveh Shalom Synagogue
- Nicknames: Par'bo, Foto, Bakaa; Parijs van Suriname (Dutch) (Paris of Suriname)
- Location within Suriname Location within South America
- Coordinates: 05°51′08″N 55°12′14″W
- Country: Suriname
- District: Paramaribo District
- Founded: 1613

Area
  - Capital city: 182 km^{2} (70 sq mi)
- Elevation: 3 m (9.8 ft)

Population (2012)
  - Capital city: 240,924
  - Estimate (2026): 237,426
  - Rank: 1st in Suriname
  - Density: 1,320/km^{2} (3,430/sq mi)
  - Urban: 252,581
- Time zone: UTC-03:00 (SRT)
- HDI (2022): 0.708 high · 1st

UNESCO World Heritage Site
- Official name: Historic Inner City of Paramaribo
- Criteria: Cultural: ii, iv
- Reference: 940
- Inscription: 2002 (26th Session)
- Endangered: 2026–present
- Area: 30 ha (74 acres)
- Buffer zone: 60 ha (150 acres)

Paramaribo, (Note: English: UK: /ˌpærəˈmærɪboʊ/ PARR-ə-MARR-ib-oh, US: /ˌpɑːrəˈmɑːrɪboʊ/ PAR-ə-MAR-ib-oh; Dutch: [ˌpaːraːˈmaːriboː]; Sranan Tongo: [paɾaˈmaɾibo]; Eastern Maroon Creole: Palamalibo.) locally nicknamed Foto, (Note: Sranan Tongo: [ˈfoto]; lit. 'city'.) is the capital and largest city of Suriname, located on the banks of the Suriname River in the Paramaribo District. Paramaribo has a population of roughly 252,581 people as of the 2025 estimate, almost half of Suriname's population. The historic inner city of Paramaribo has been a UNESCO World Heritage Site since 2002.

== Name ==
The city is named for the Paramaribo tribe living at the mouth of the Suriname River; the name is from Tupi–Guarani para "large river" + maribo "inhabitants".

== History ==
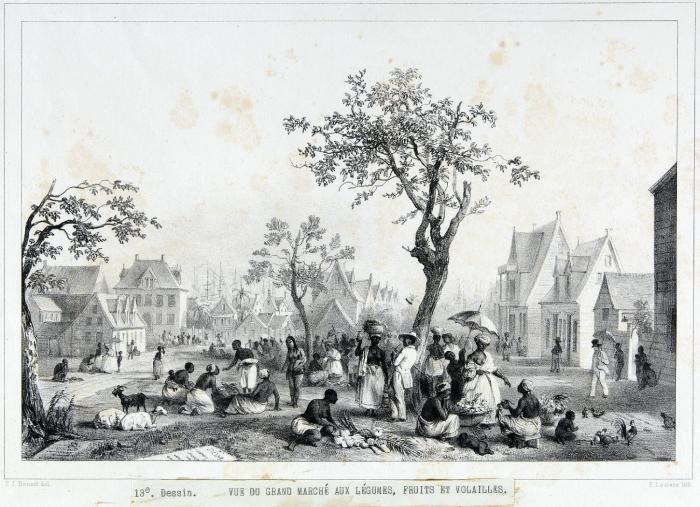
1830s lithograph of the market

The name Paramaribo is probably a corruption of the name of a native village, spelled Parmurbo in the earliest Dutch sources. This was the location of the first Dutch settlement, a trading post established by Nicolaes Baliestel and Dirck Claeszoon van Sanen in 1613. English and French traders also tried to establish settlements in Suriname, including a French post established in 1644 near present-day Paramaribo.

All earlier settlements were abandoned sometime before the arrival of English settlers in 1650 to found Surinam. They were sent by the English governor of Barbados, Lord Francis Willoughby, 5th Baron Willoughby of Parham, and established a town on the site of Paramaribo (though probably south of the current town center). The town was protected by a fort, called Fort Willoughby. In 1662, Governor Willoughby was granted the settlement and surrounding lands (extending into Suriname's interior) by King Charles II. Around 1665 the village of Paramaribo was expanded and quickly outranked the earlier settlement of Torarica.

In 1667, during the Second Anglo-Dutch War, Paramaribo was conquered by a squadron of ships under Abraham Crijnssen. The Treaty of Breda in 1667 confirmed Paramaribo as the leading town of the now Dutch colony of Suriname. The fort protecting Paramaribo was renamed Fort Zeelandia in honor of the Dutch province that had financed Crijnssen's fleet. (The town was also renamed New Middelburg but the name did not catch on with the inhabitants.)

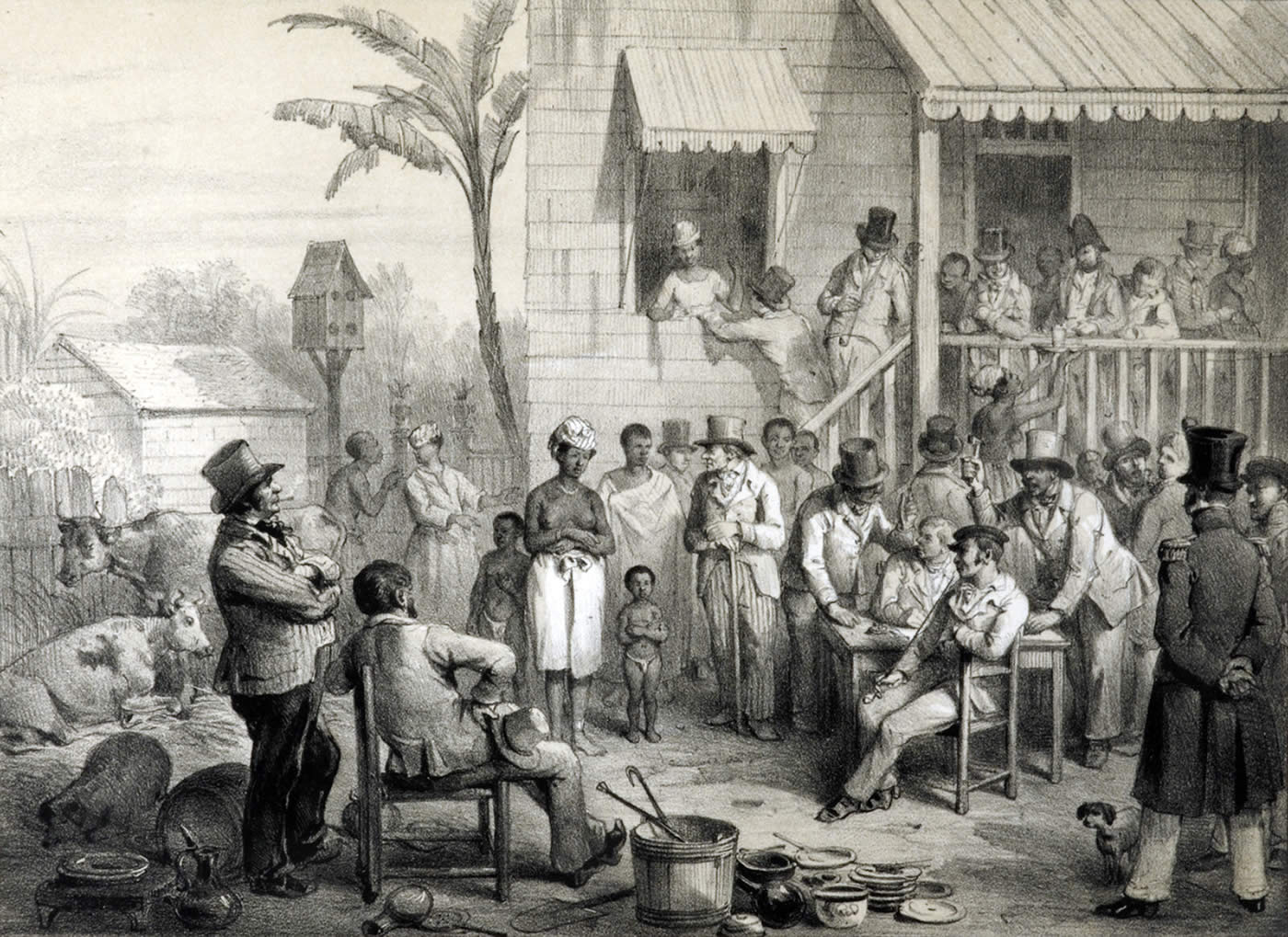
Slave auction in Paramaribo, in 1831

The population of Paramaribo has always been very diverse. Among the first British settlers were many Jews and one of the oldest synagogues in the Americas, the Neveh Shalom Synagogue, is found in Paramaribo. The population of the town was greatly increased after 1873, when formerly enslaved people (who had been freed in 1863) were allowed to stop working for their former masters and leave the sugar plantations.

Paramaribo has remained the capital of Suriname, from its colonial days through the independence of Suriname in 1975 to the present day. The old town has suffered many devastating fires over the years, notably in January 1821 (which destroyed over 400 buildings) and September 1832 (which destroyed nearly 50 buildings). The slaves Kodjo, Mentor, and Present were found guilty of arson, and burnt alive.

In May 1972, the Paramaribo Zoo opened. In 1987, an administrative reorganization took place in Suriname and the city was divided into 12 administrative resorts (jurisdictions).

== Geography ==
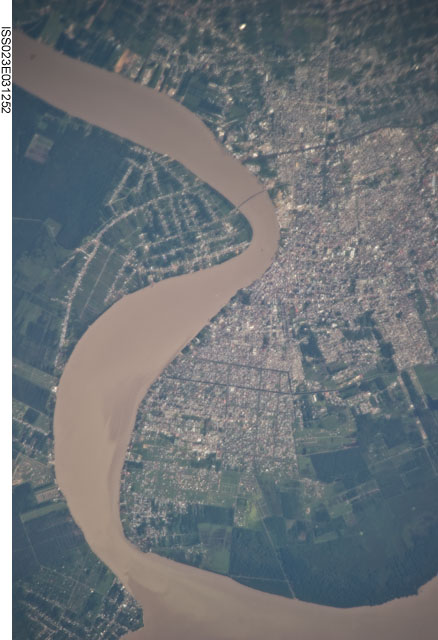
View of Paramaribo from space

The city is located on the Suriname River, approximately 15 kilometres (9.3 mi) inland from the Atlantic Ocean, in the Paramaribo District.

Evolution of Paramaribo

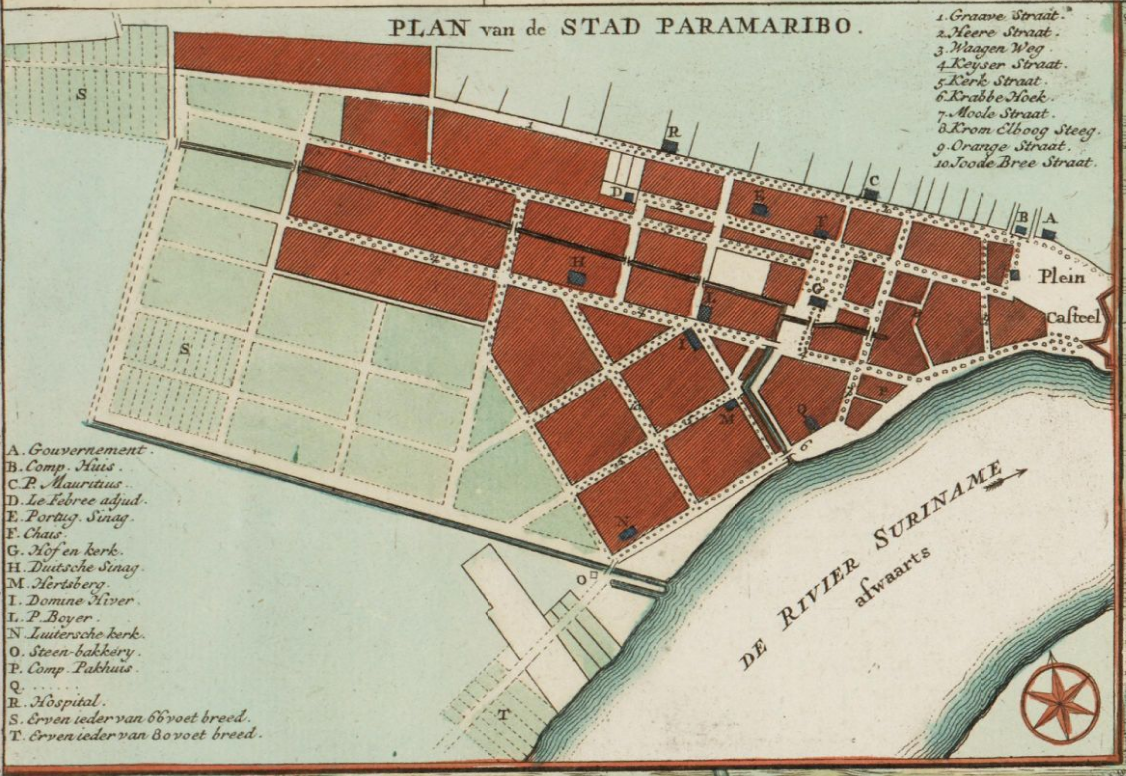
Paramaribo around 1737.

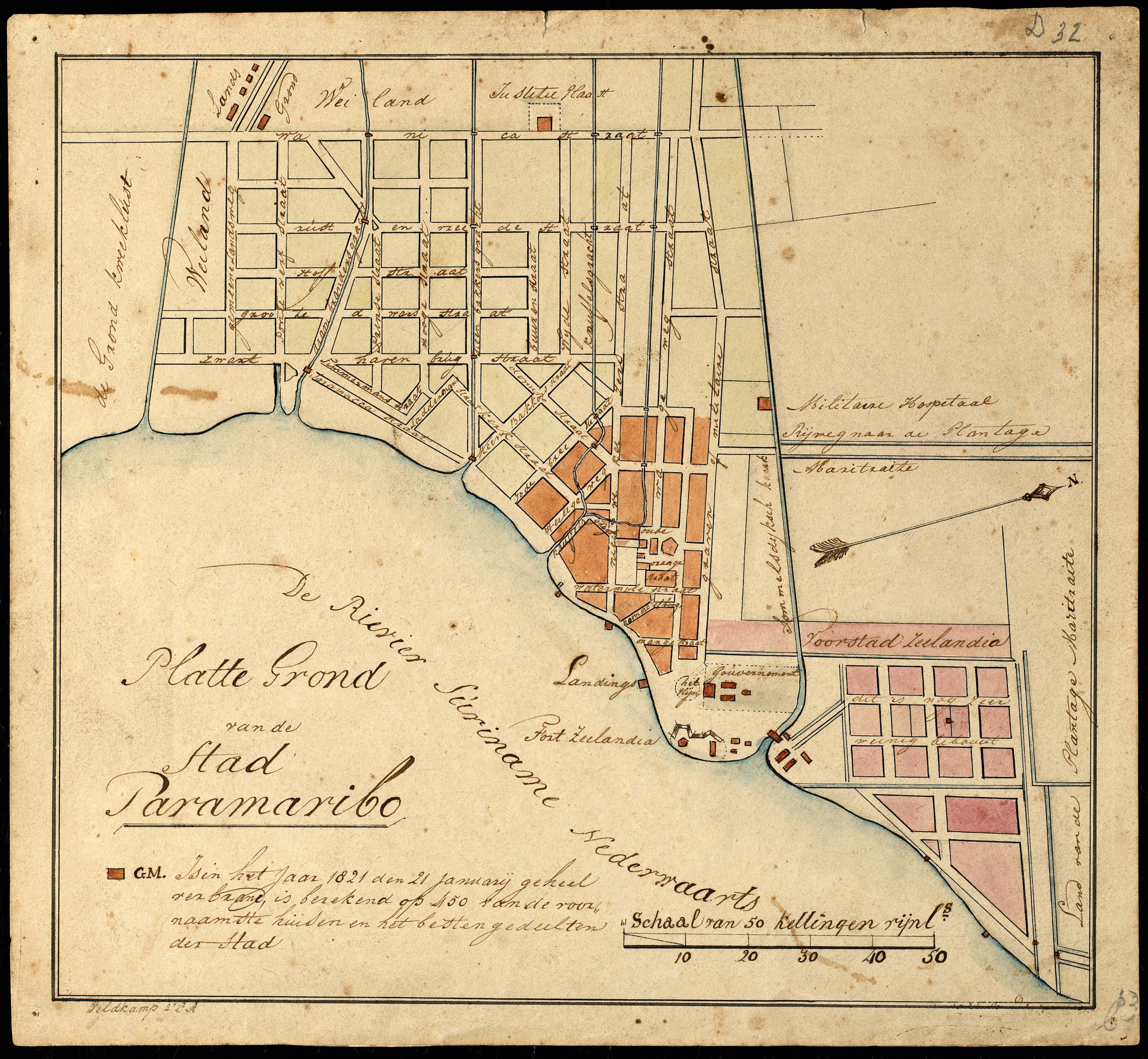
Paramaribo in 1821. The area devastated by the city fire of that year is indicated in brown.

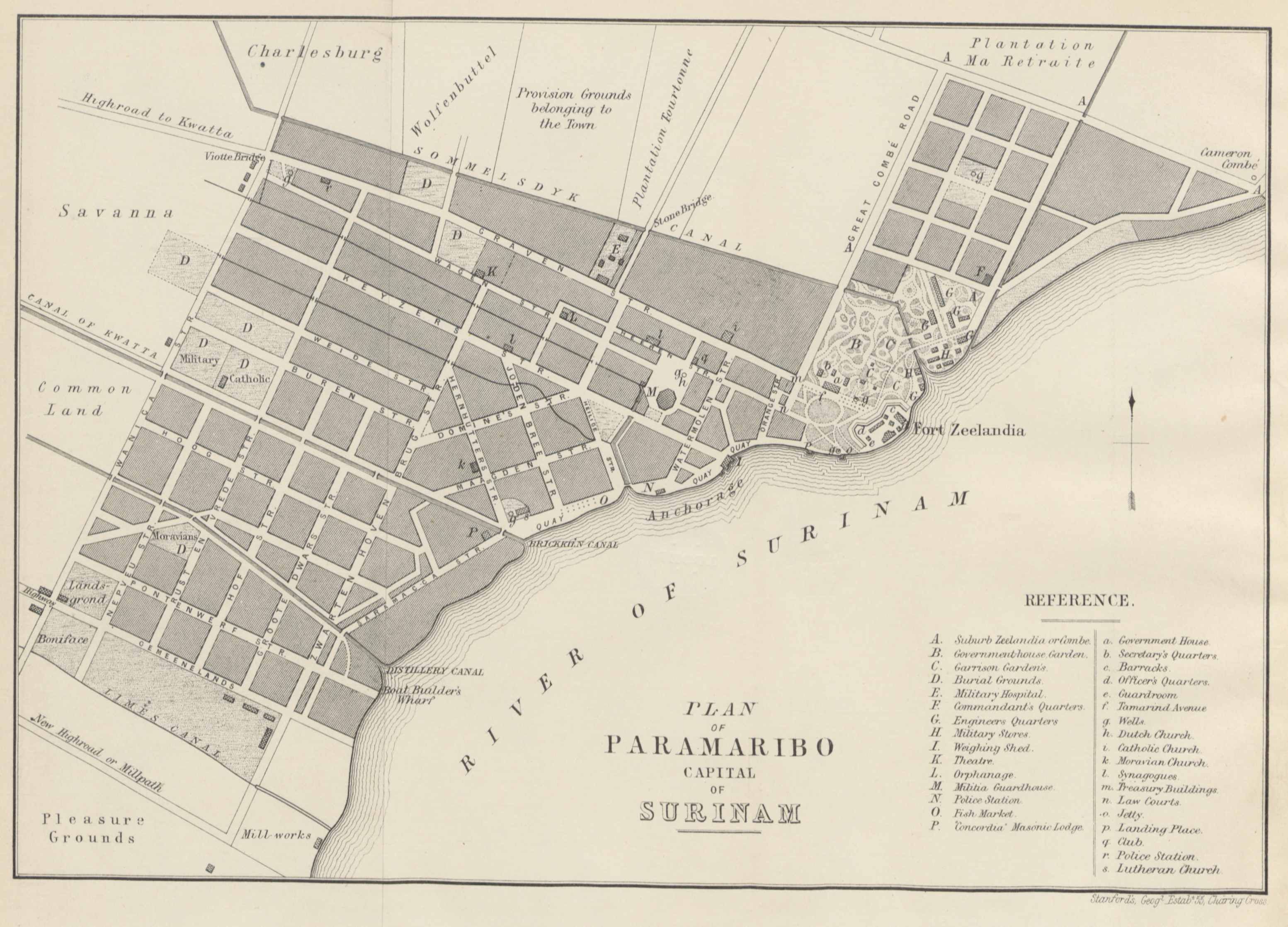
Paramaribo around 1876.

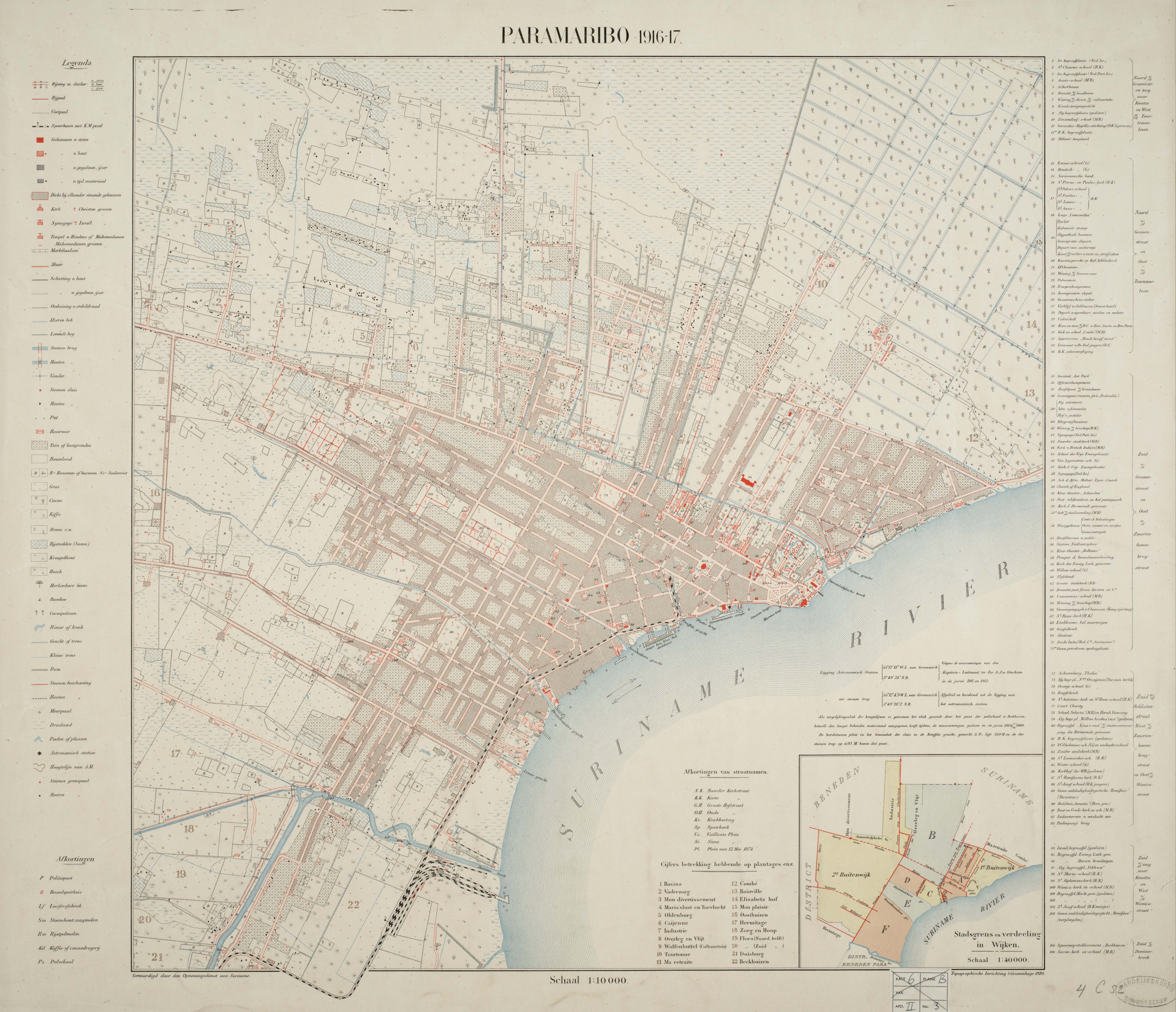
Paramaribo around 1916–1917

=== Climate ===
Paramaribo features a tropical rainforest climate (Af), under the Köppen climate classification. Because Paramaribo is more subject to the Intertropical Convergence Zone than the trade winds and experiences no tropical cyclones, its climate is classified as equatorial. The city has no true dry season; all 12 months of the year average more than 60 millimetres or 2.4 inches of rainfall, but the city does experience noticeably wetter and drier periods during the year. The Northern Hemisphere "autumn" (September through November) is the driest period of the year in Paramaribo, and the heaviest rainfall occurs from April to July. Common to many cities with this climate, temperatures are relatively consistent throughout the year, with average high temperatures of 30 degrees Celsius and average low temperatures of 24 degrees Celsius. Paramaribo on average receives roughly 2,135 millimetres or 84 inches of rainfall each year.

Climate data for Paramaribo (Zorg en Hoop Airport) (1991–2020)
Month	Jan	Feb	Mar	Apr	May	Jun	Jul	Aug	Sep	Oct	Nov	Dec	Year
Mean daily maximum °C (°F)	29.2 (84.6)	29.4 (84.9)	28.7 (83.7)	29.9 (85.8)	30.0 (86.0)	30.2 (86.4)	30.7 (87.3)	31.5 (88.7)	32.0 (89.6)	32.1 (89.8)	31.2 (88.2)	30.0 (86.0)	30.4 (86.7)
Daily mean °C (°F)	27.1 (80.8)	27.3 (81.1)	27.7 (81.9)	27.9 (82.2)	27.6 (81.7)	27.4 (81.3)	27.8 (82.0)	28.7 (83.7)	29.3 (84.7)	29.3 (84.7)	28.5 (83.3)	27.5 (81.5)	28.0 (82.4)
Mean daily minimum °C (°F)	24.1 (75.4)	23.2 (73.8)	23.5 (74.3)	24.5 (76.1)	23.7 (74.7)	24.4 (75.9)	24.4 (75.9)	24.6 (76.3)	25.1 (77.2)	25.1 (77.2)	24.8 (76.6)	24.2 (75.6)	24.3 (75.7)
Average precipitation mm (inches)	172.7 (6.80)	146.2 (5.76)	130.5 (5.14)	215.8 (8.50)	306.6 (12.07)	295.6 (11.64)	234.3 (9.22)	147.7 (5.81)	90.3 (3.56)	86.5 (3.41)	125.7 (4.95)	183.7 (7.23)	2,135.5 (84.07)
Average precipitation days (≥ 3.0 mm)	15	12	14	16	22	22	20	15	11	12	13	18	190
Average relative humidity (%)	76.1	74.4	73.2	76.2	79.4	80.2	77.4	74.0	70.9	71.0	75.6	78.3	75.6
Source 1: NOAA
Source 2: World Meteorological Organization (Average precipitation days)

== Demographics ==
Historical population
Year	Pop.	±% p.a.
1790	18,000	—
1831	15,265	−0.40%
1853	16,031	+0.22%
1980	167,798	+1.87%
1995	228,551	+2.08%
2004	242,946	+0.68%
2012	240,924	−0.10%

Paramaribo has a population of 240,924 people (2012 census). While the population number has been stagnating in recent years, the population in many towns in the surrounding Wanica District is increasing.

The city is famed for its diverse ethnic makeup with 27% identifying as Creoles (African or mixed African-European descent), 23% as East Indian, 18% as Multiracial, 16% as Maroons (descendants of escaped enslaved Africans), 10% as Javanese, 2% as Indigenous, 1.5% as Chinese, and smaller numbers of Europeans (primarily of Dutch and Portuguese descent), Lebanese and Jews. In the past decades a significant number of Brazilians, Guyanese and new Chinese immigrants have settled in Paramaribo.

== Economy ==
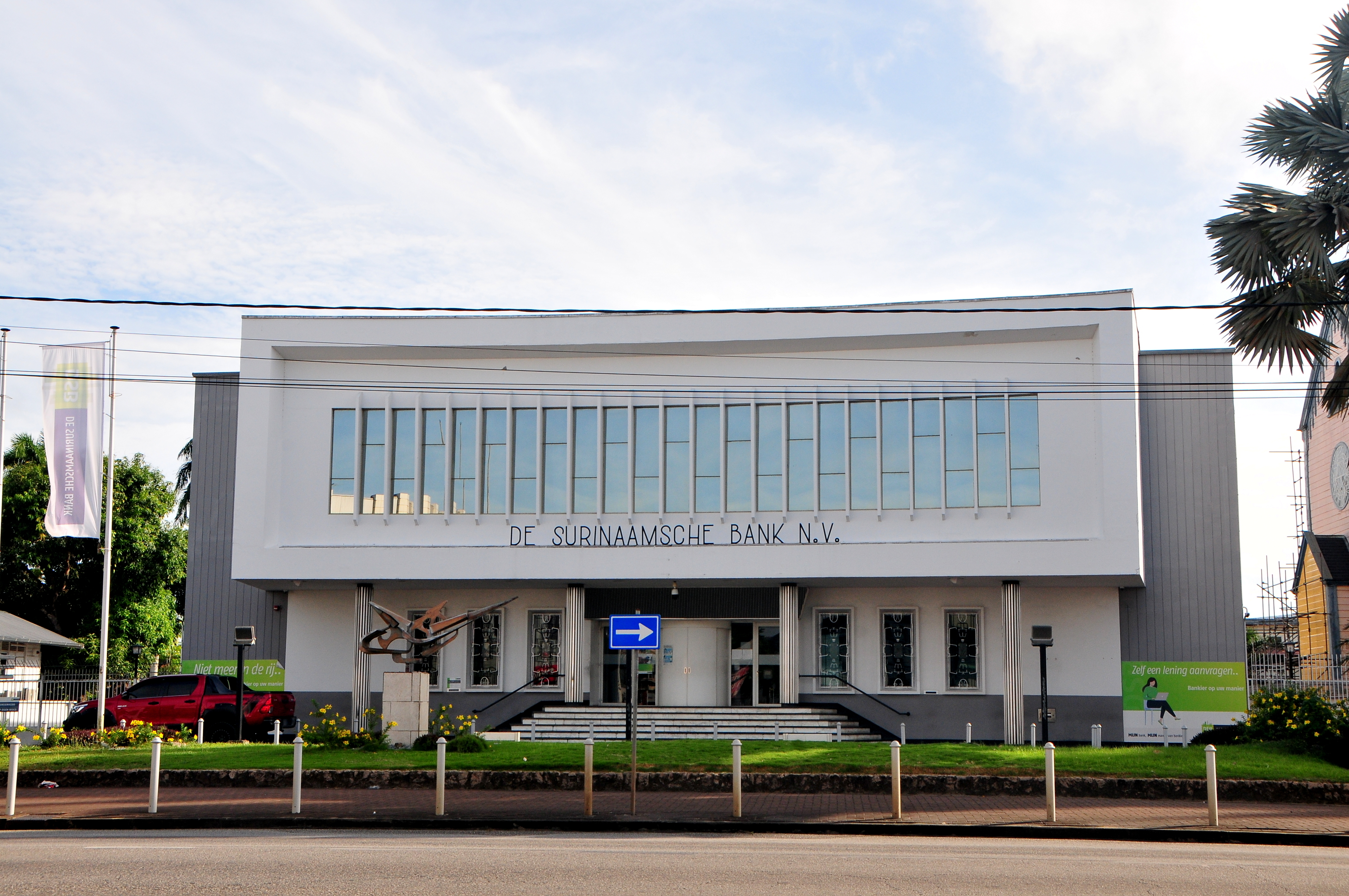
De Surinaamsche Bank building in Paramaribo

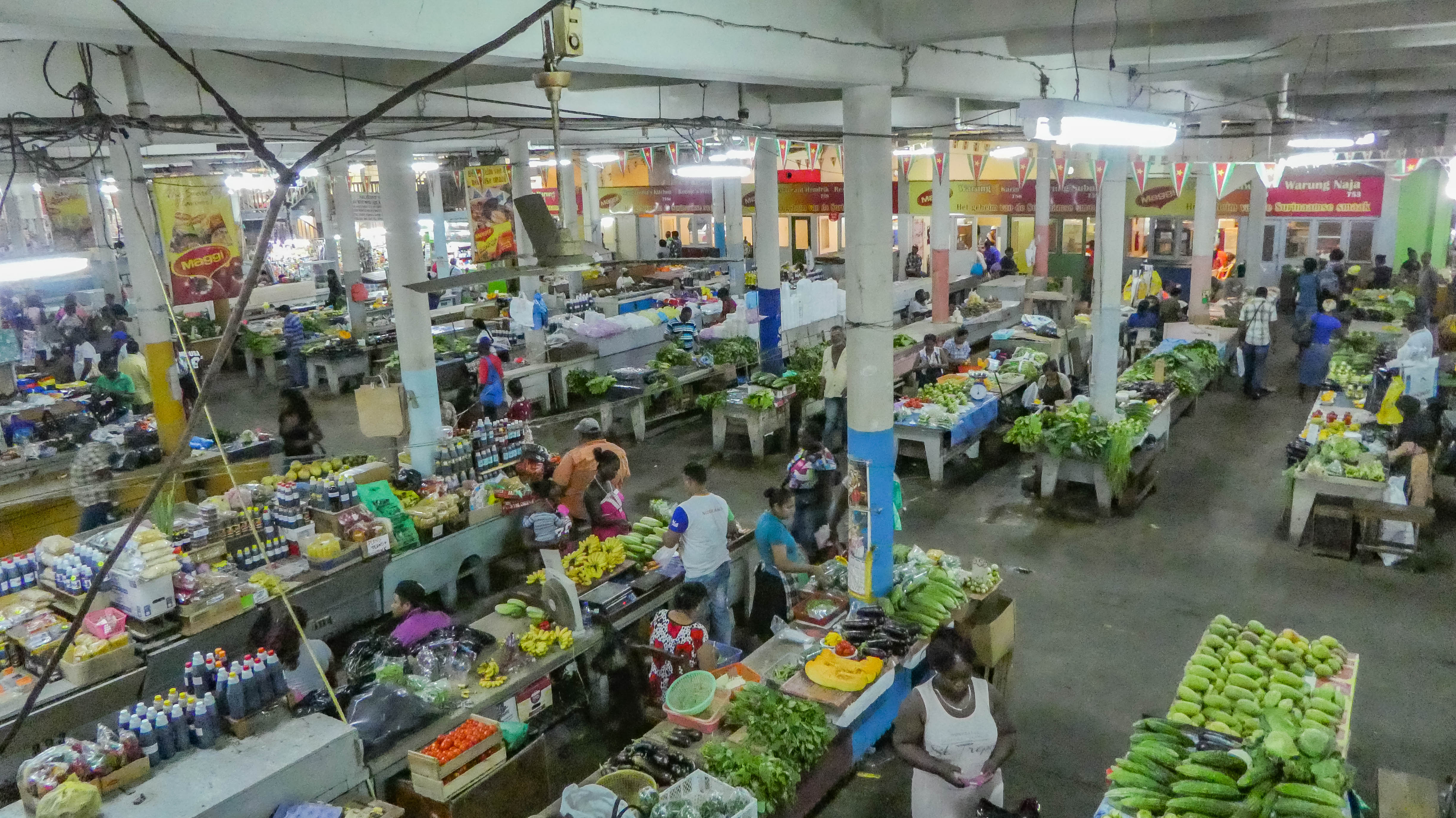
Central market in Paramaribo

Paramaribo is the business and financial centre of Suriname. Even though the capital city does not produce significant goods itself, almost all revenues from the country's main export products gold, oil, bauxite, rice, and tropical wood are channeled through its institutions. All banks, insurance corporations and other financial and commercial companies are headquartered in Paramaribo. Around 75 per cent of Suriname's GDP is consumed in Paramaribo.

Tourism is an increasingly important sector, with most visitors coming from the Netherlands.

== Government ==
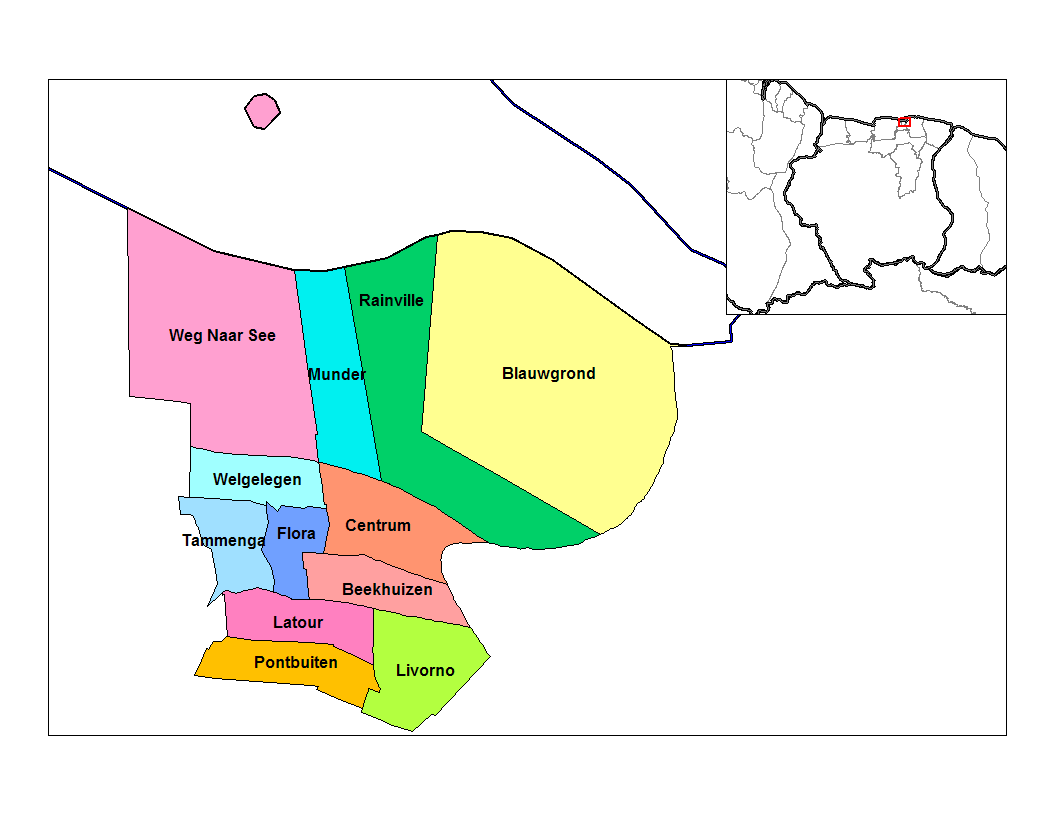
Ressorten of the Paramaribo district.

Administratively, Paramaribo forms its own district in Suriname. The resorts of Paramaribo district therefore correspond to boroughs of the city. There are twelve resorts in the Paramaribo district:

Ressort/jurisdiction	Area in square km	Population density	Population (2012)
Blauwgrond	43	661.3	31,483
Rainville	31	930.7	22,747
Munder	14	1146.4	17,234
Centrum	9	3252.7	20,631
Beekhuizen	6	3297.2	17,185
Weg naar Zee	41	321.3	16,037
Welgelegen	7	3387.0	19,304
Tammenga	6	2385.5	15,819
Flora	4	3836.5	19,538
Latour	6	4358.0	29,526
Pontbuiten	6	3246.2	23,211
Livorno	9	931.8	8,209

== Transport ==
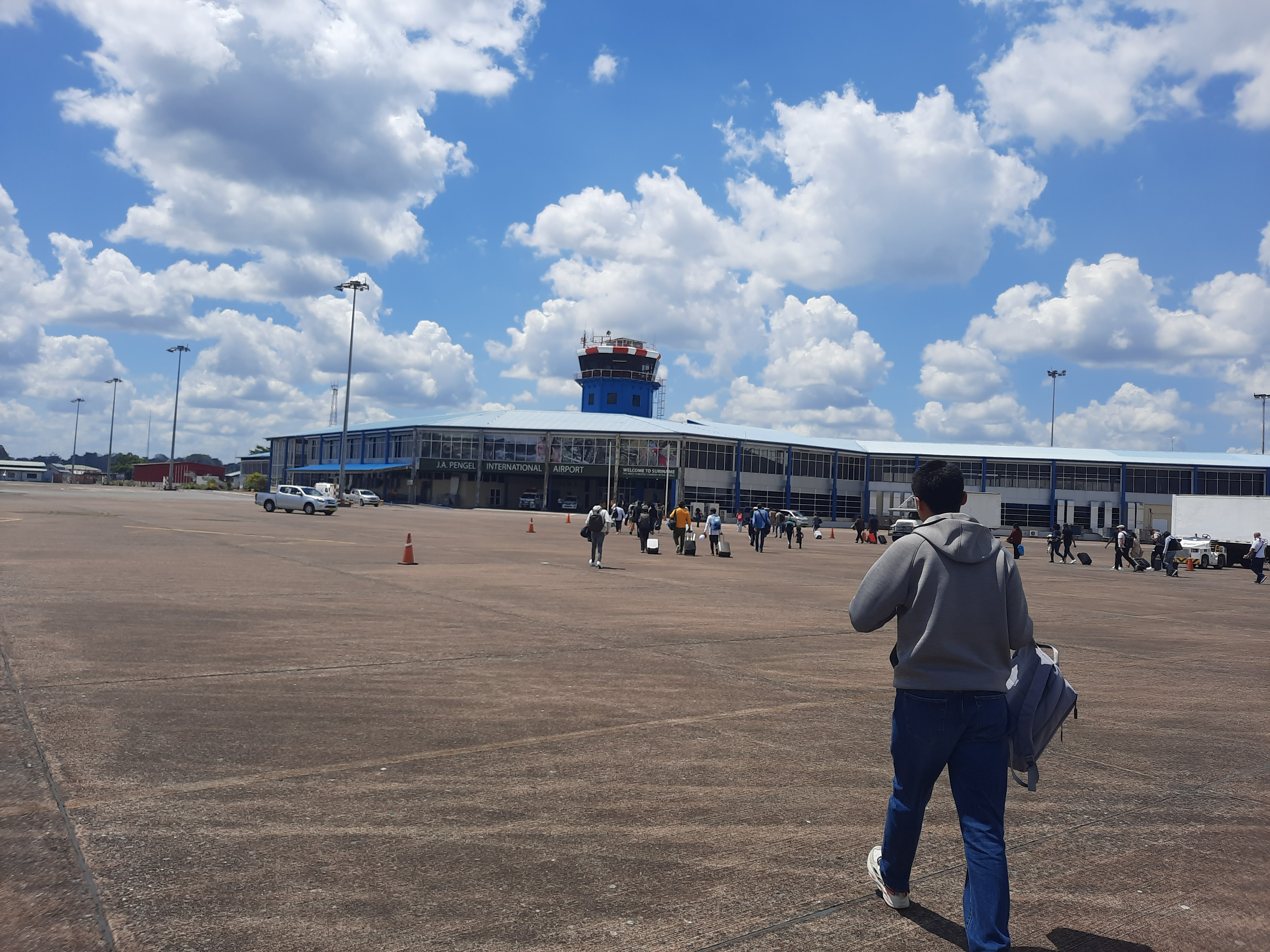
Johan Adolf Pengel International Airport

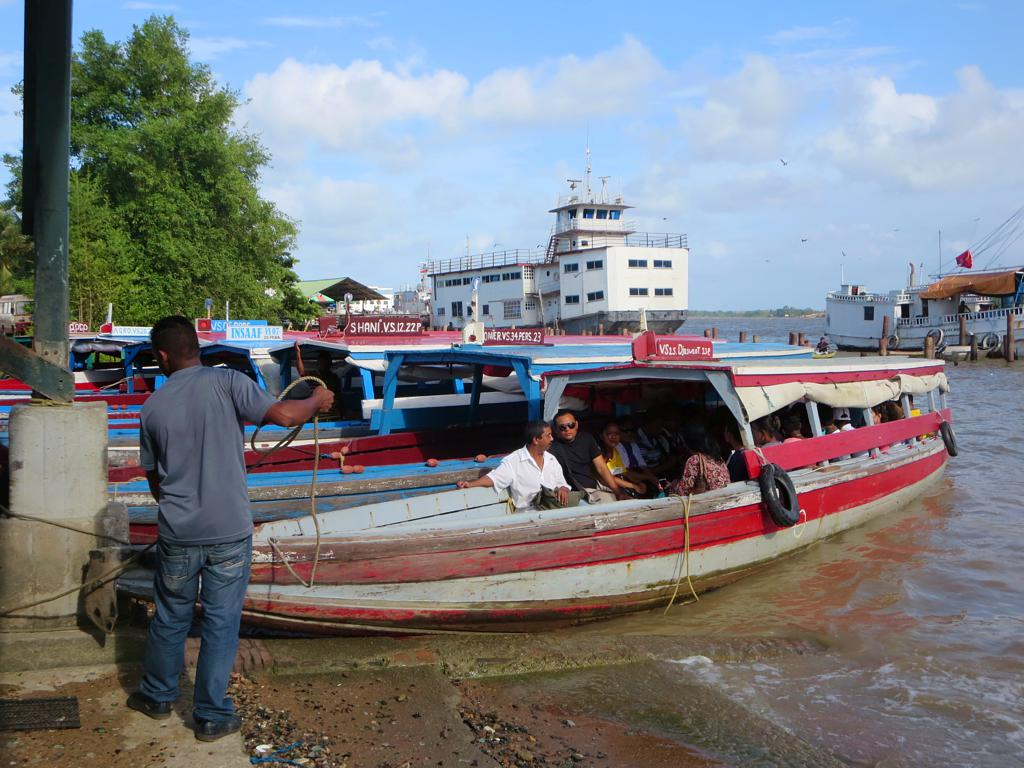
Small ferries take passengers across the Suriname River from Paramaribo to the Commewijne District

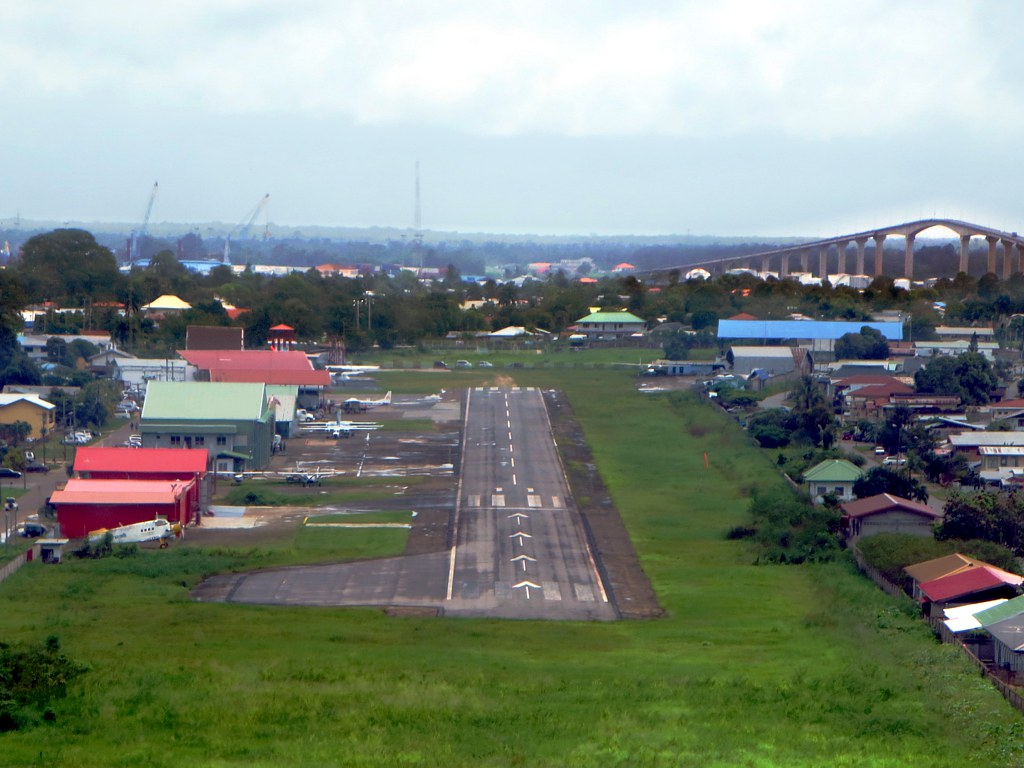
Zorg en Hoop Airport is one of Suriname's two international airports

Paramaribo is served by the Johan Adolf Pengel International Airport and Zorg en Hoop Airport for local flights. The Jules Wijdenbosch Bridge, which is part of the East-West Link, connects Paramaribo with Meerzorg on the other side of the Suriname River.

The Jules Sedney Harbour is the main harbour for cargo. The former harbour of Waterkant is used by ferries.

Most airlines like Gum Air and Blue Wing Airlines have their head offices on the grounds of Zorg en Hoop Airport in Paramaribo.

== Education ==
Paramaribo's institution of higher learning is Anton de Kom University of Suriname, the country's only university.

Teachers academy (Insituut voor de Opleiding van Leraren), the country's teachers academy to prepare teachers for secondary education levels.

AlphaMax Academy is a private international school established on 1 September 1998, in Paramaribo, Republic of Suriname. The school is run by the Directors of the AlphaMax Foundation.

== Healthcare ==
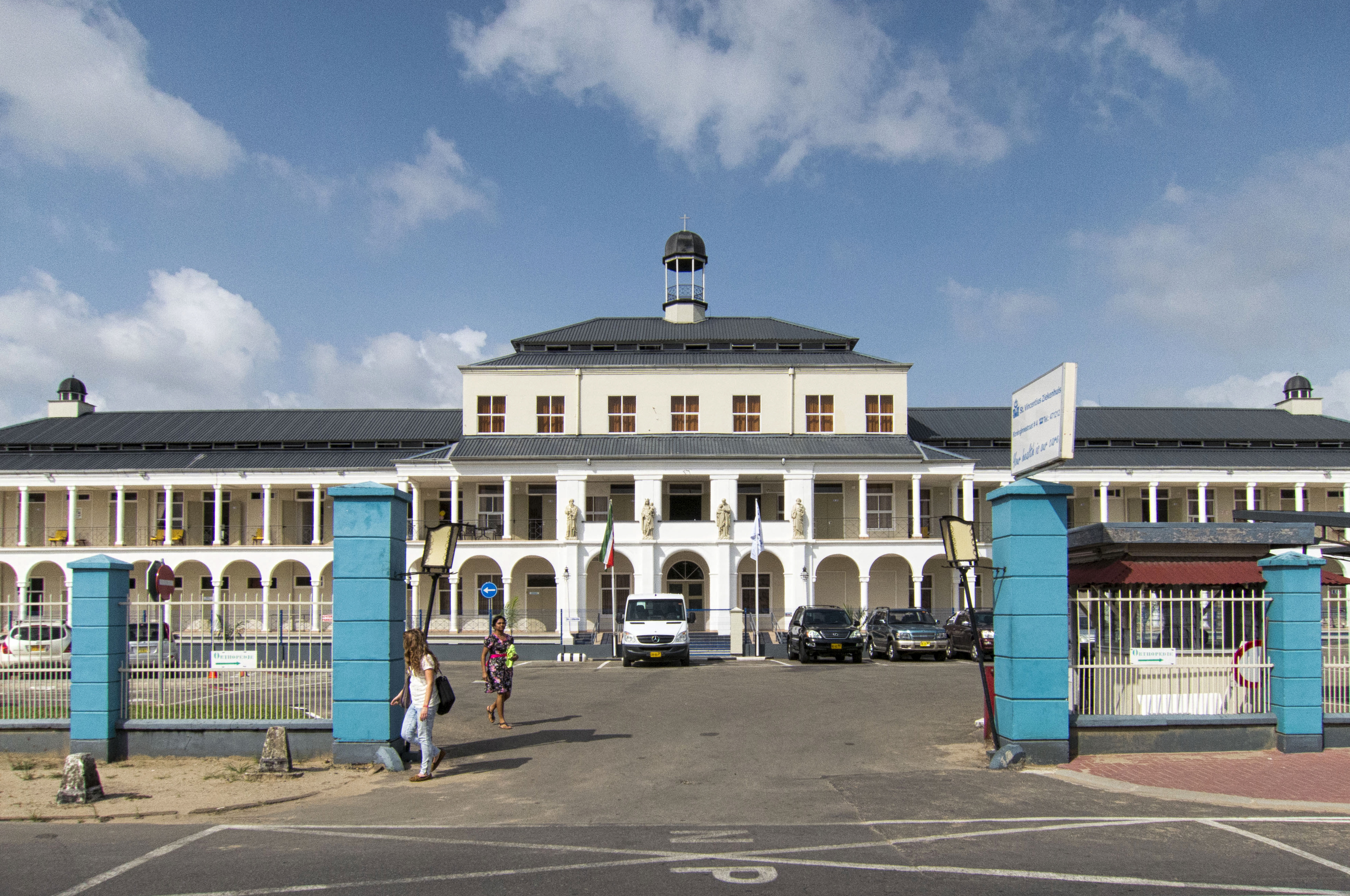
Sint Vincentius Hospital in Paramaribo

Paramaribo is home to four hospitals, the Academic Hospital Paramaribo, 's Lands Hospitaal, Sint Vincentius Hospital and Diakonessenhuis.

== Historic inner city of Paramaribo ==
The Dutch colonial town established in 17th and 18th centuries was declared a UNESCO World Heritage Site in 2002. The historic inner city is located along the left bank of the Suriname River. The original architecture of buildings and street plan has largely remained intact and preserved.

== Notable landmarks ==
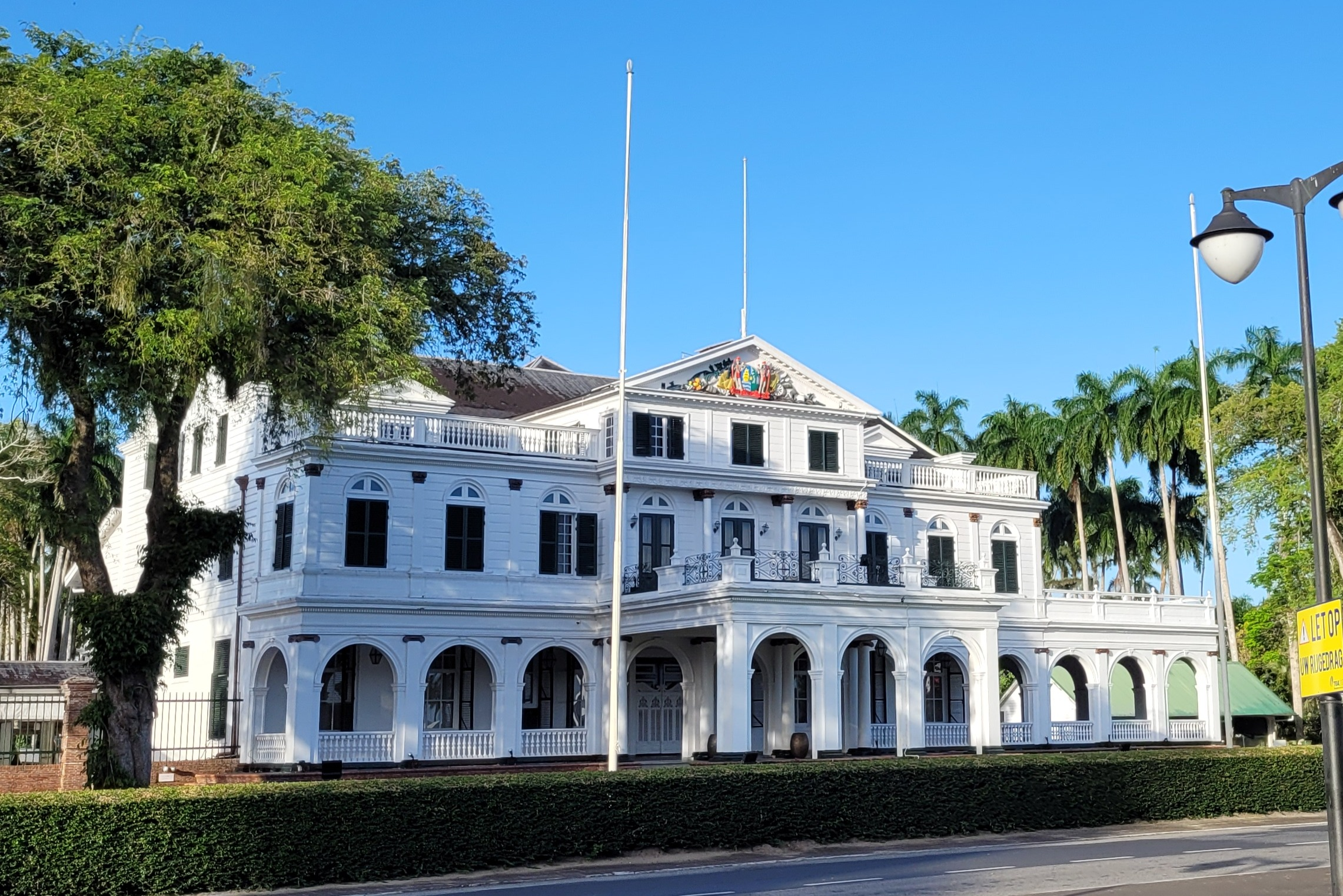
Presidential Palace of Suriname

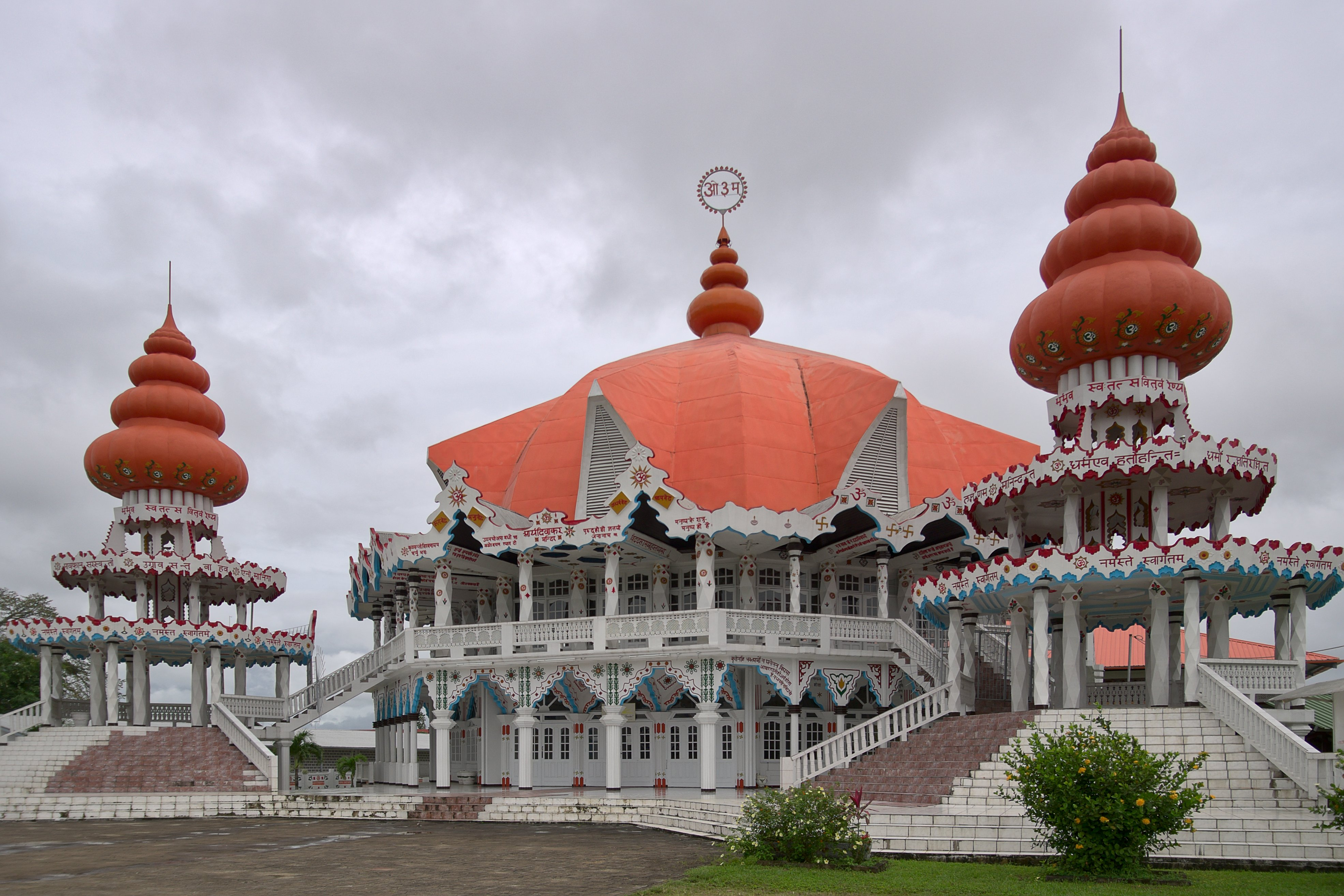
Arya Diwaker temple

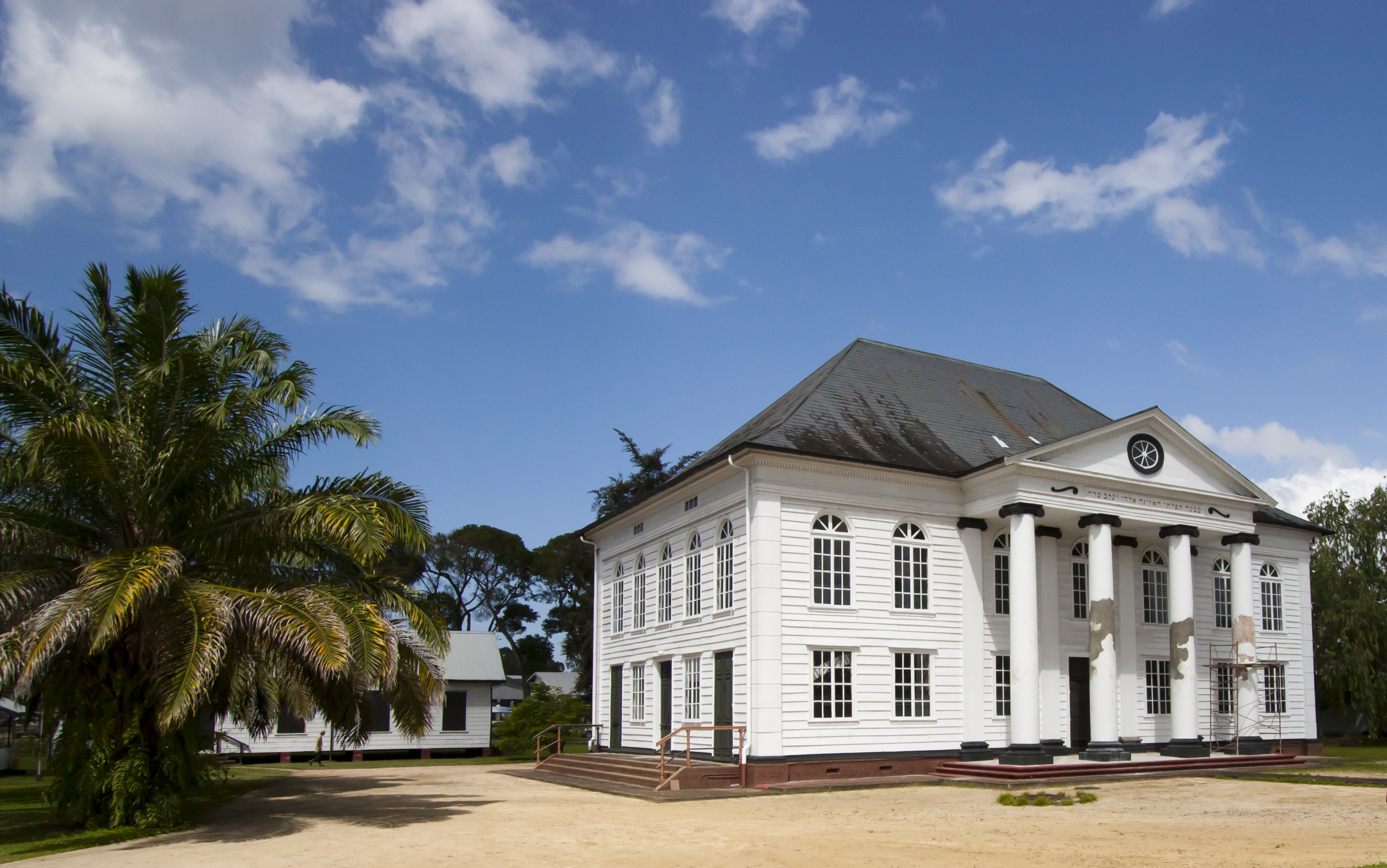
Paramaribo's Neveh Shalom Synagogue

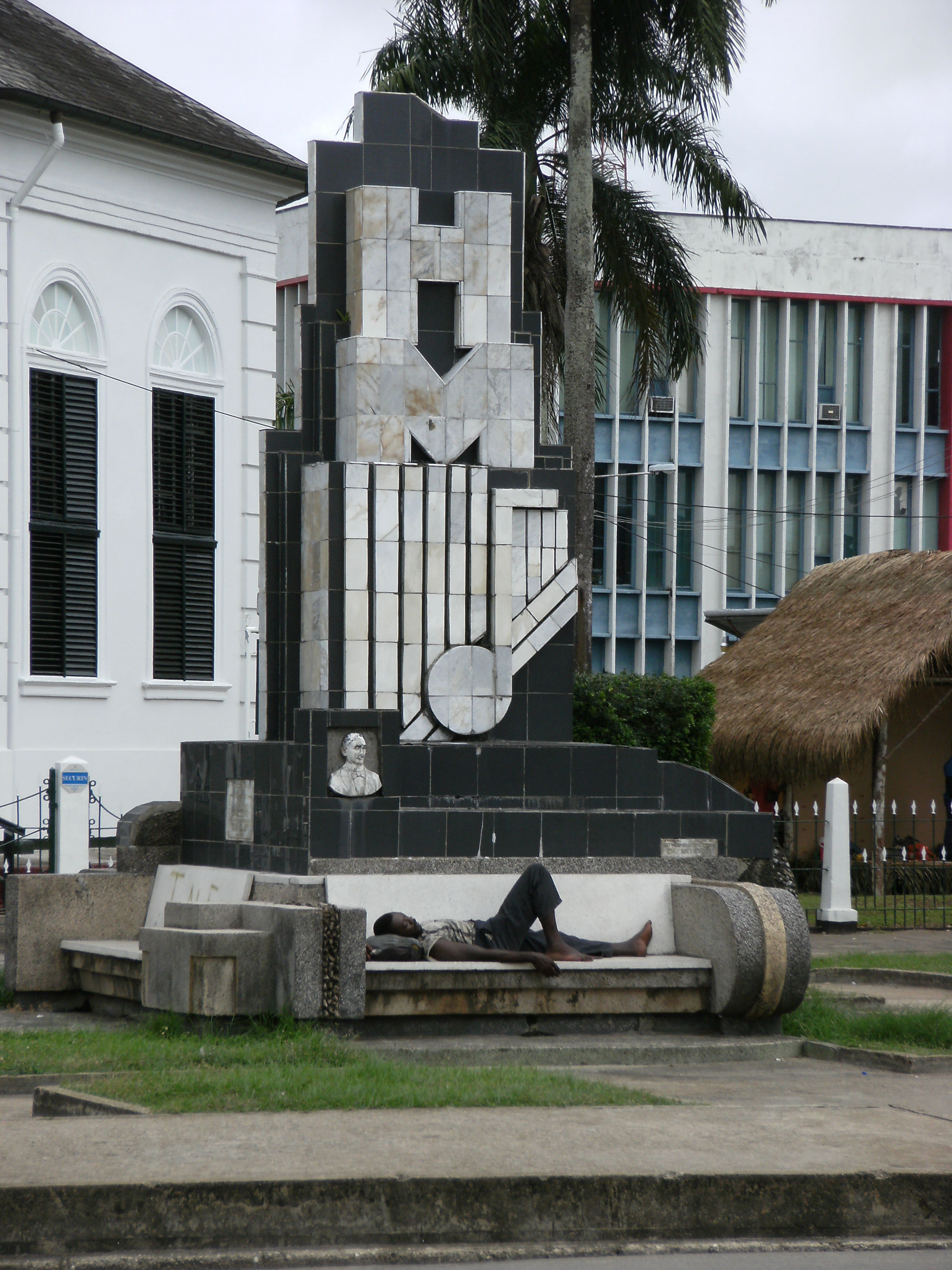
Helstone Monument

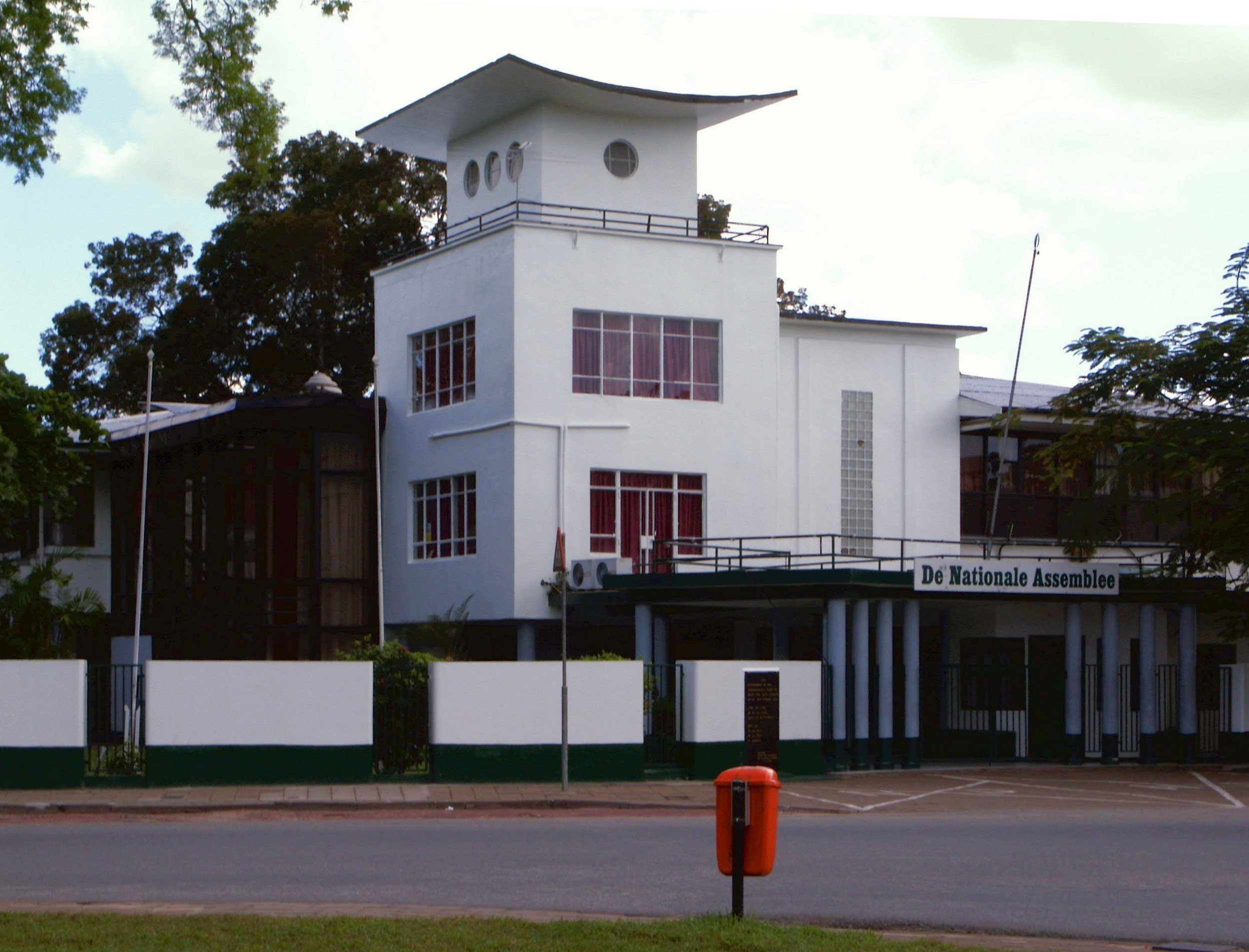
The National Assembly of Suriname

- Fort Zeelandia
- Presidential Palace of Suriname
- Roman Catholic St Peter and St Paul Cathedral
- Suriname Mosque
- National Assembly of Suriname
- Neveh Shalom Synagogue
- The Arya Diwaker Hindu Temple
- Garden of Palms, a landscape garden of royal palms behind the presidential palace
- Centrumkerk
- Kwakoe, abolition of slavery memorial

== Notable people ==
- Ashwin Adhin, Vice President (2015–2020), politician
- Ronny Aloema, football player
- Henck Arron, politician
- Maarten Atmodikoro, football player
- Regi Blinker, football player
- Remy Bonjasky, kickboxer
- Edson Braafheid, football player
- Stanley Brouwn, artist
- Romeo Castelen, football player
- Audrey Christiaan, activist
- Augusta Curiel, photographer
- Edgar Davids, football player
- Johan Ferrier, politician
- Stanley Franker, tennis player
- Henk Fraser, football player
- Ulrich van Gobbel, football player
- Rebecca Gomperts, physician and women's rights activist
- Majoie Hajary, composer, pianist
- Jimmy Floyd Hasselbaink, football player
- Ruth Jacott, singer, Dutch representative in the Eurovision Song Contest 1993
- Jerry de Jong, football player
- Rajendre Khargi, journalist and ambassador to the Netherlands
- Anton de Kom, resistance fighter and author
- Kelvin Leerdam, football player
- François Levaillant (1753–1824), explorer, ornithologist
- Coenraad van Lier, physician, politician
- Jeangu Macrooy, singer, Dutch representative in the Eurovision Song Contest 2020 and the Eurovision Song Contest 2021
- Stanley Menzo, football player
- Felipe Enrique Neri, Baron de Bastrop (1729–1827), businessman and landowner known for his money in the Anglo-American settlement of Texas.
- Pim de la Parra, director
- Monique Pool, environmentalist
- Johan Adolf Pengel, politician
- Fred Ramdat Misier, politician
- Herman Rijkaard, football player
- Andy Ristie, kickboxer
- Jairzinho Rozenstruik, mixed martial artist and kickboxer
- Grace Schneiders-Howard, civil service worker/politician
- Clarence Seedorf, football player
- Jennifer Geerlings-Simons, 10th President of Surinam (since 2025), politician
- Andwélé Slory, football player
- Tyrone Spong, kickboxer and boxer
- Regilio Tuur, boxer
- Ronald Venetiaan, politician
- Mark de Vries, football player
- Jules Wijdenbosch, politician
- Fabian Wilnis, football player
- Aron Winter, football player
- Zachari Zeegelaar, FIFA football assistant referee

== Twin towns – sister cities ==
Paramaribo is twinned with:

- Antwerp, Antwerp Province, Belgium
- Hangzhou, Zhejiang, China
- Willemstad, Curaçao, Netherlands
- Yogyakarta, Special Region of Yogyakarta, Indonesia
- Miami-Dade County, Florida, United States

== See also ==
- Paramaribo District
