= Paramaribo Zoo =

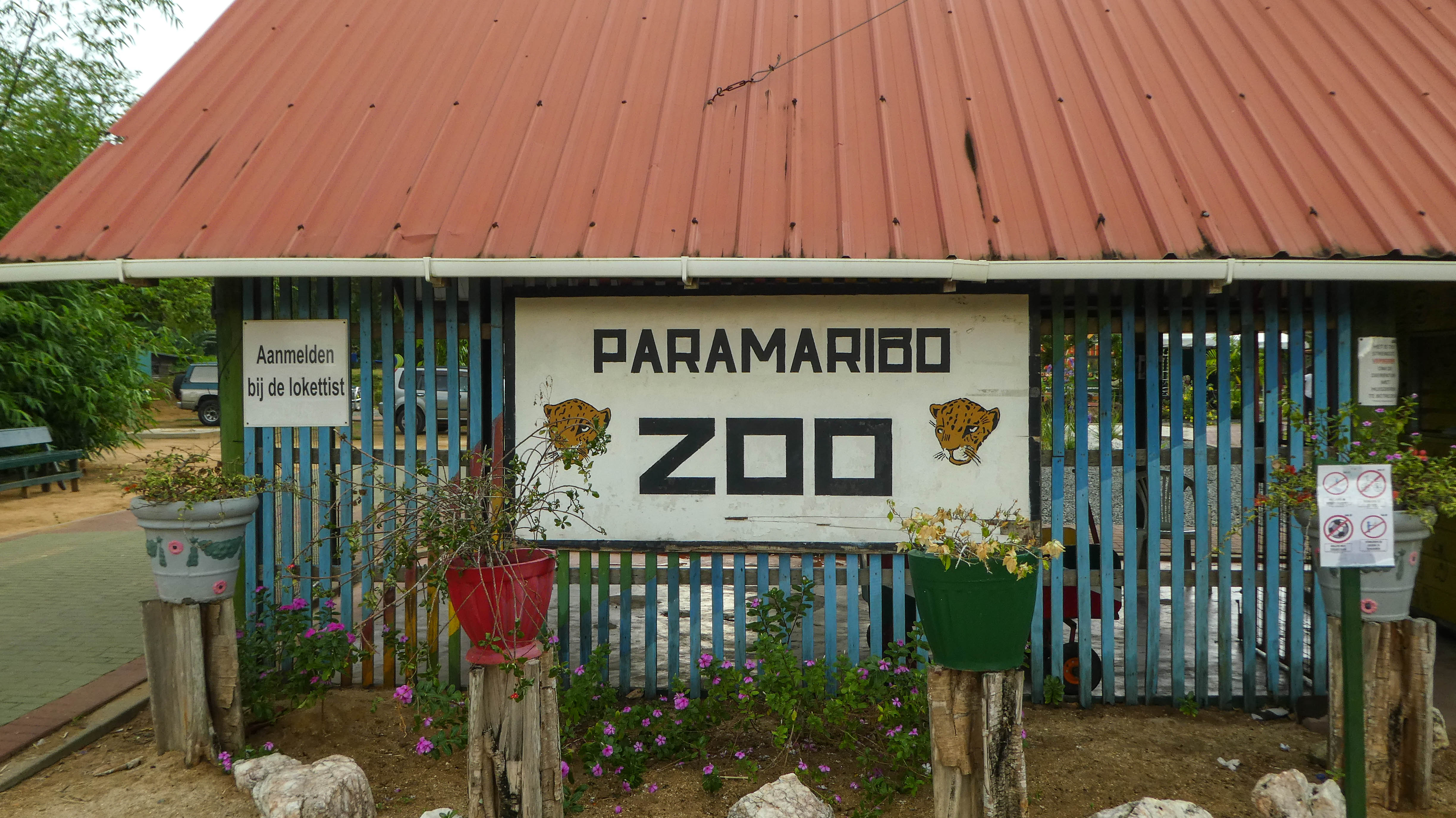
- Entrance of Paramaribo Zoo
- Interactive map of Paramaribo Zoo
- 5.84718°N 55.15988°W
- Date opened: May 1972
- Location: Paramaribo, Suriname
- No. of animals: 197 (2004)

The Paramaribo Zoo is the only zoo in Paramaribo, Suriname. The zoo opened in May 1972, and was an initiative of prime-minister Jopie Pengel. It is located adjacent to the Cultuurtuin in Rainville, Paramaribo.

== History ==
Prime-minister Pengel privately kept many animals in his garden. When he added lions to his collection in 1966, he thought it would be better to share the animals in a zoo. In May 1972, the Paramaribo Zoo opened next to the Cultuurtuin. Unlike most zoos, about 75% of the animals are local wild animals who had been either confiscated or were former pets. Except for the tigers, all the animals are native to Suriname.

In the 1980s, during the military dictatorship of Bouterse, a large part of the collection was lost. In 2003, the Paramaribo received support from Diergaarde Blijdorp in Rotterdam. In 2004, a benefit evening was organised by Blijdorp and Natura Artis Magistra in Amsterdam. The zoo was renovated and was reopened on 28 May 2006 by president Venetiaan. Two monkey islands were constructed. Up to then, there were no births of spider monkeys, and as of 2020, six monkeys have been born.

In March 2020, a reconstruction program started to mimic the native conditions for the animals. In April 2020, a water park for children was constructed in the park, and then the COVID-19 pandemic started. In February 2021, the zoo reopened, but is in serious financial problems.

The collection of the zoo includes several species of monkeys, caymans, a jaguar, snakes, vultures, a tiger, and scarlet ibisses.

== Gallery ==
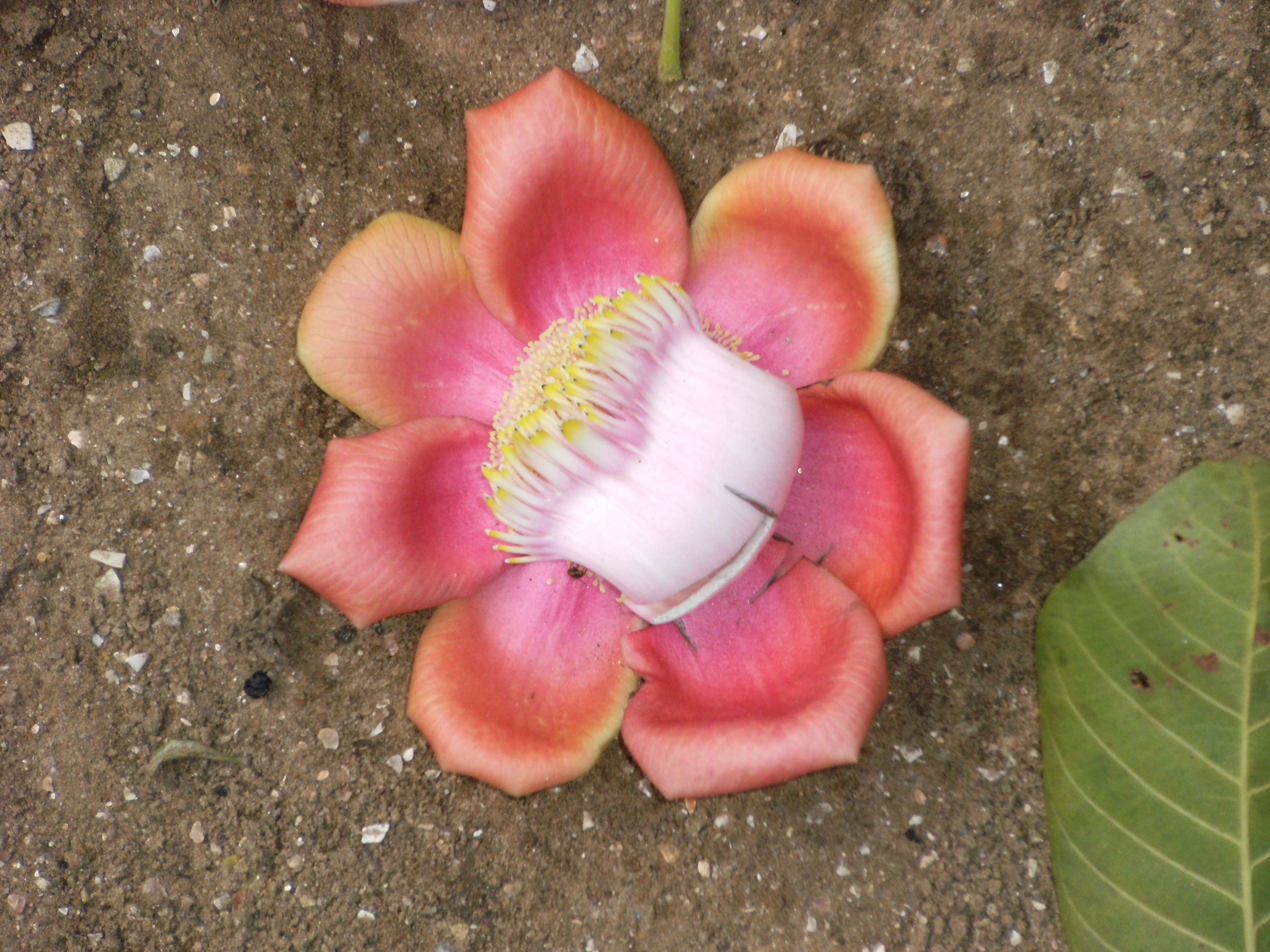
Flower

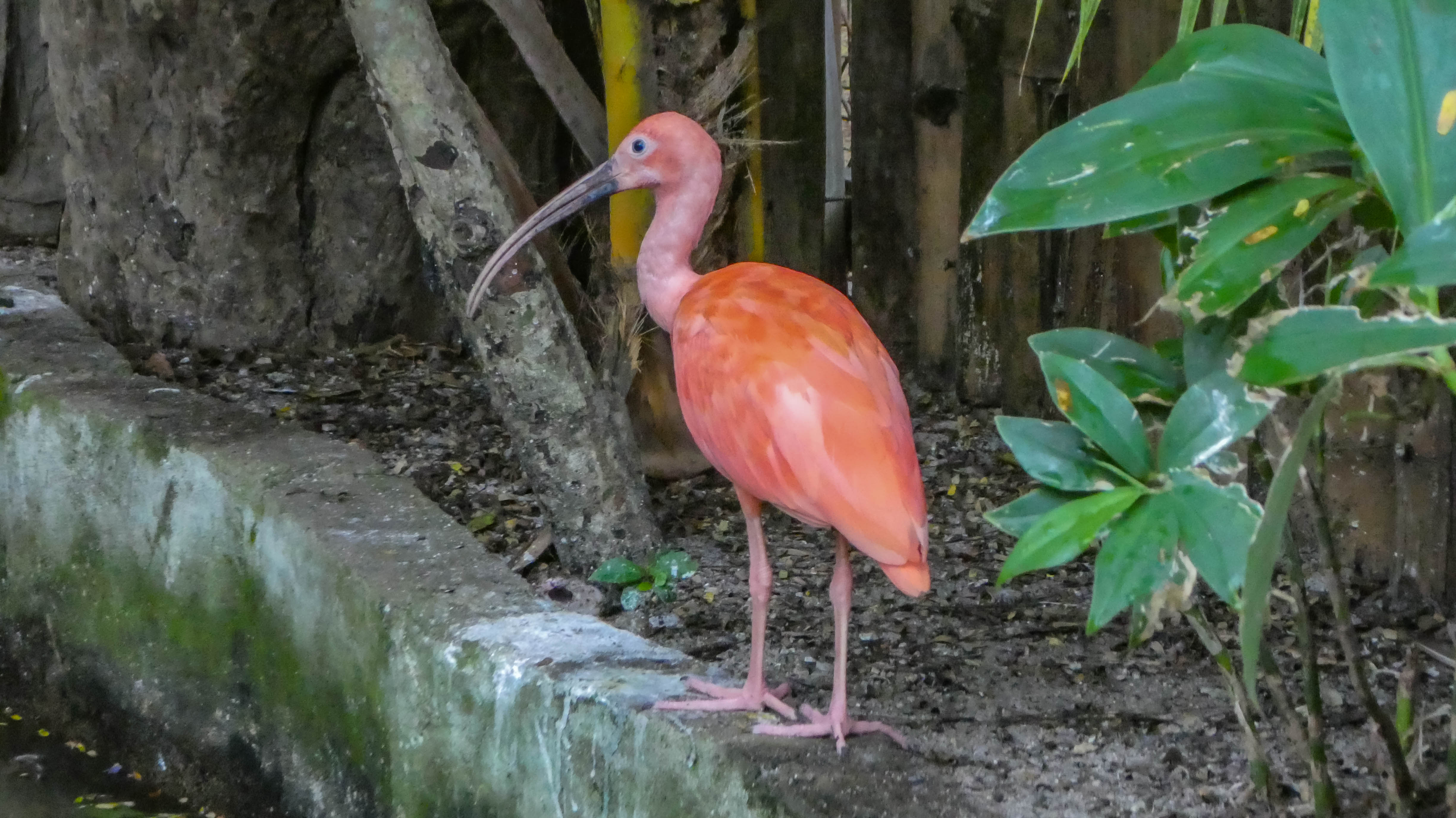
Scarlet ibis

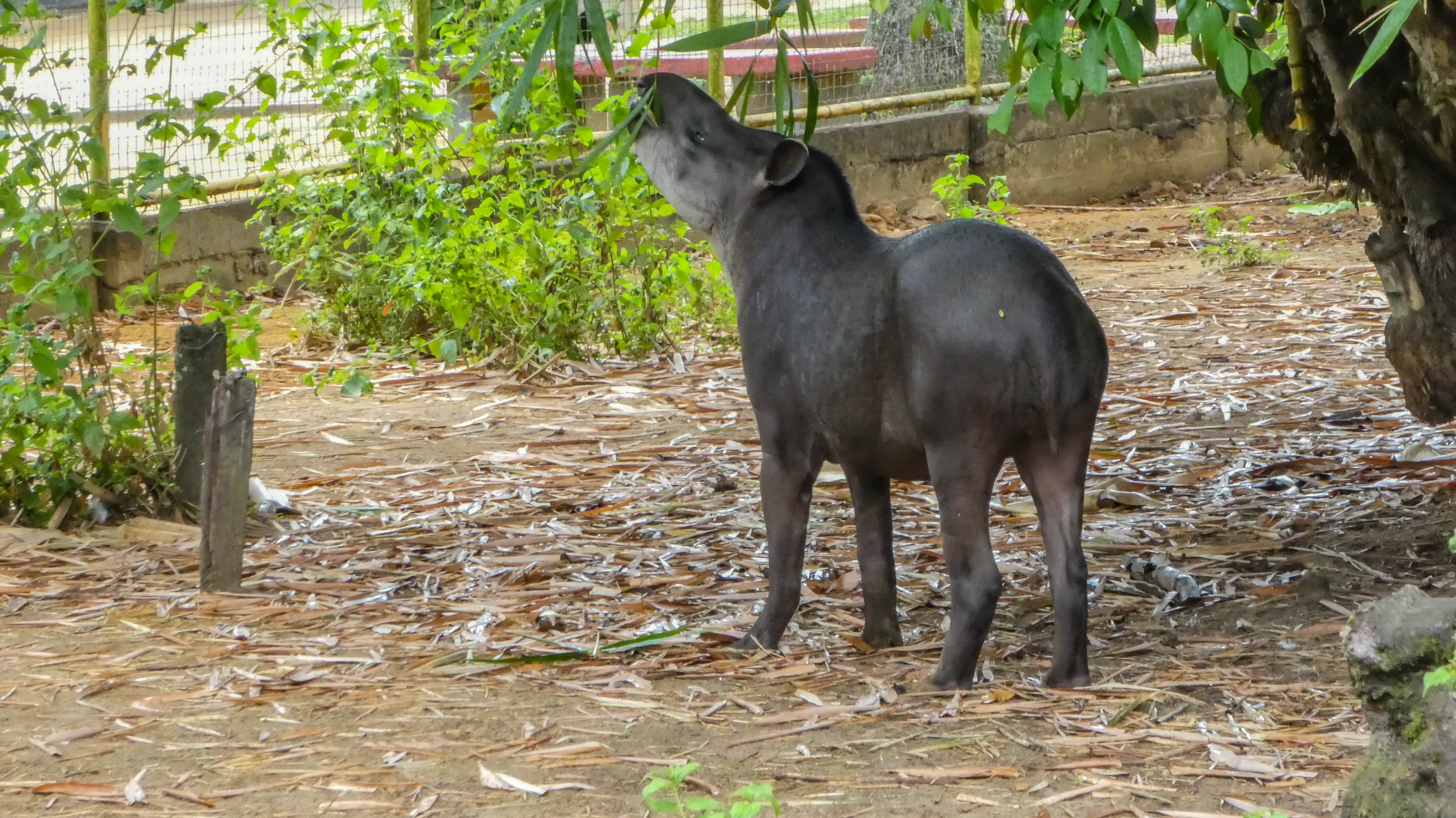
Tapir

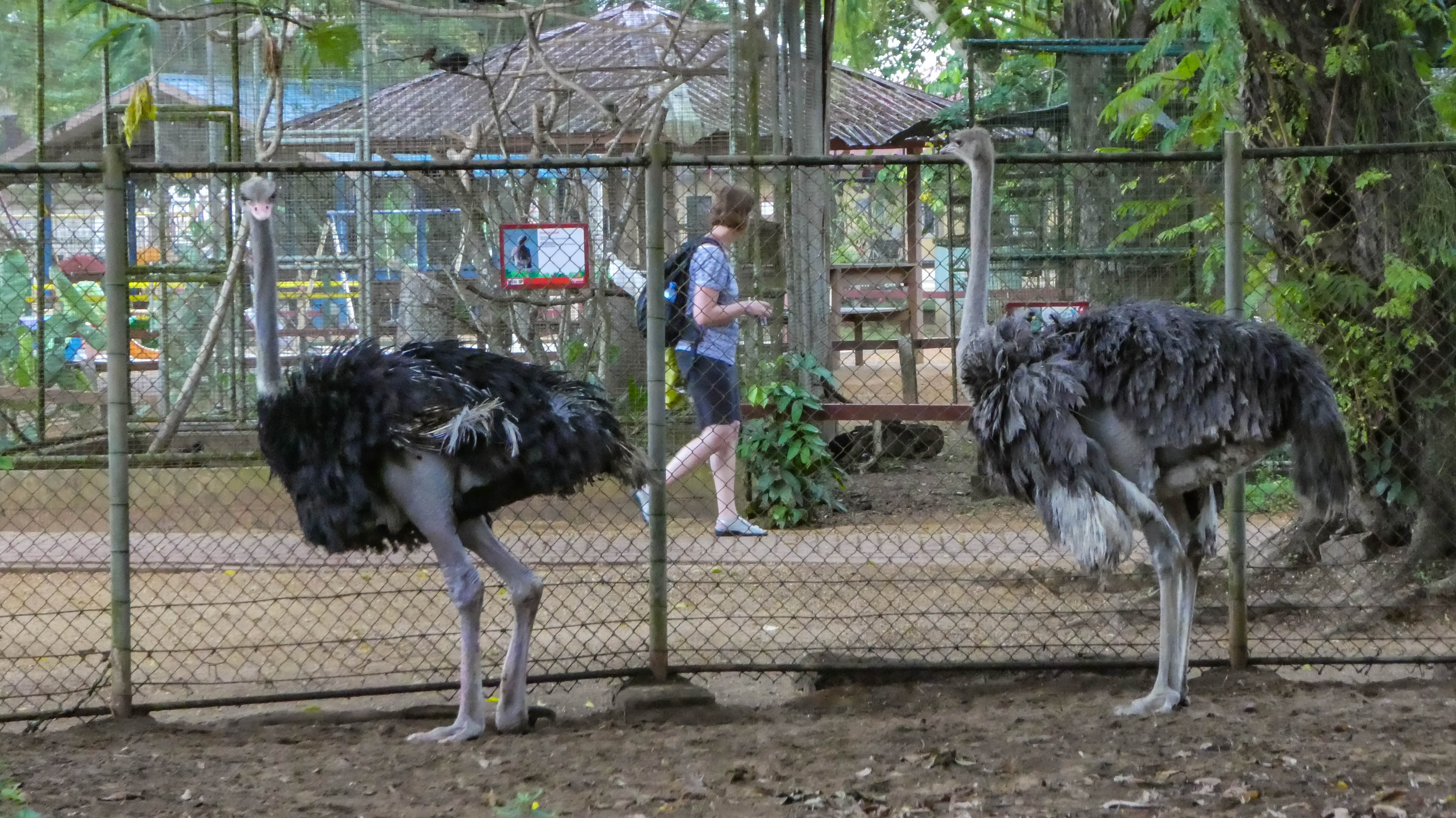
Ostriche

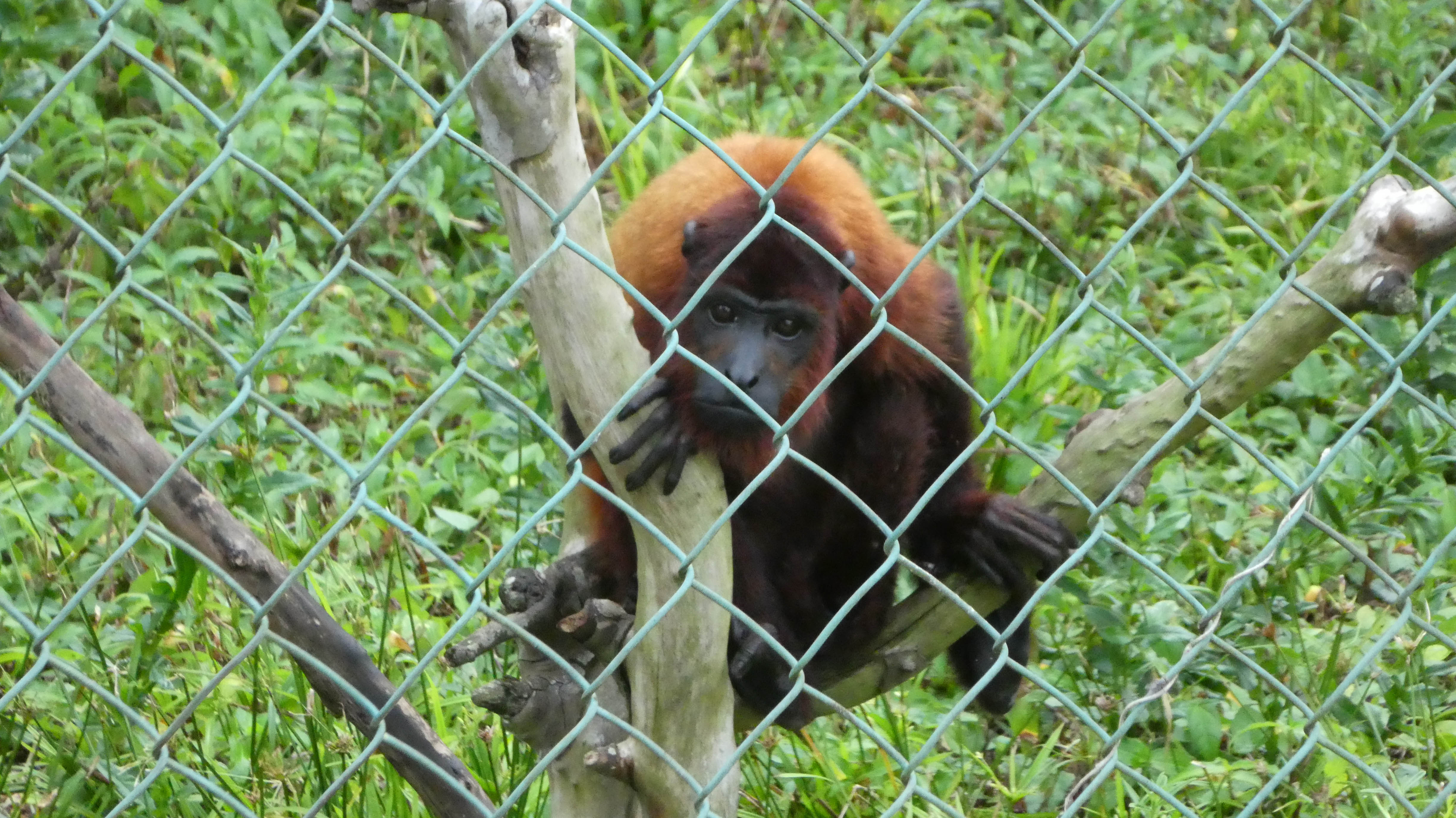
Red Howler Monkey

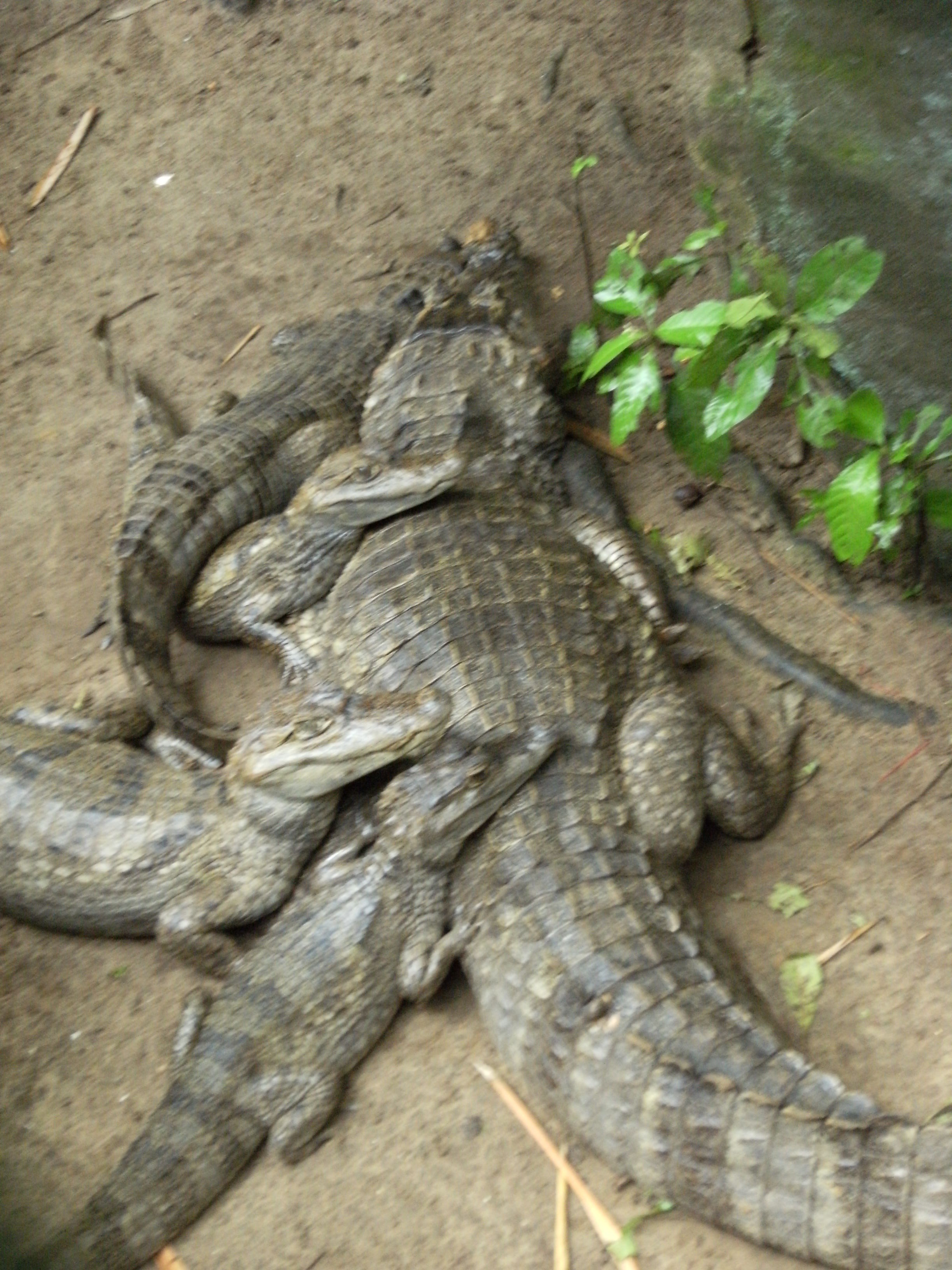
Alligator family

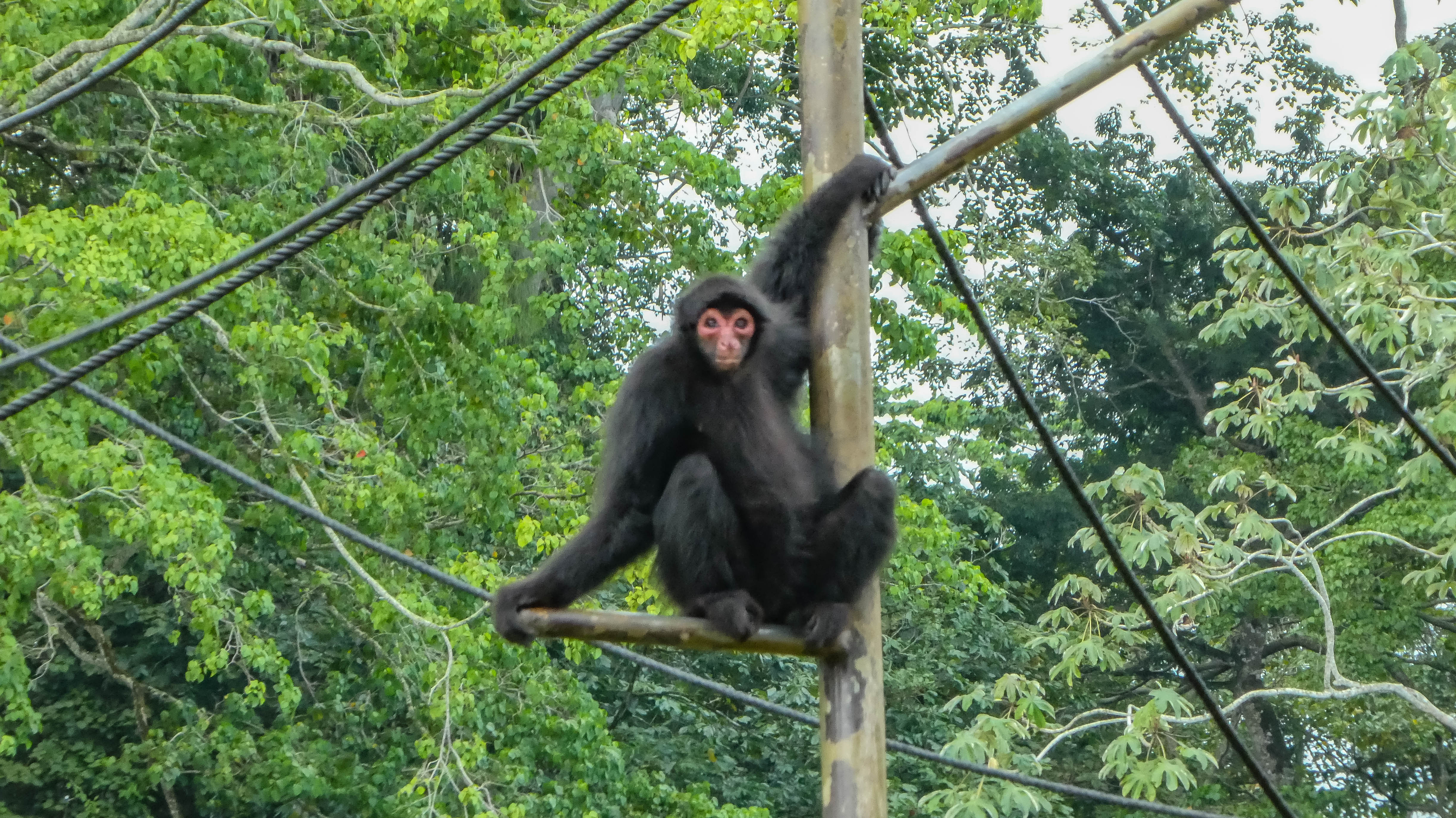
Spider Monkey

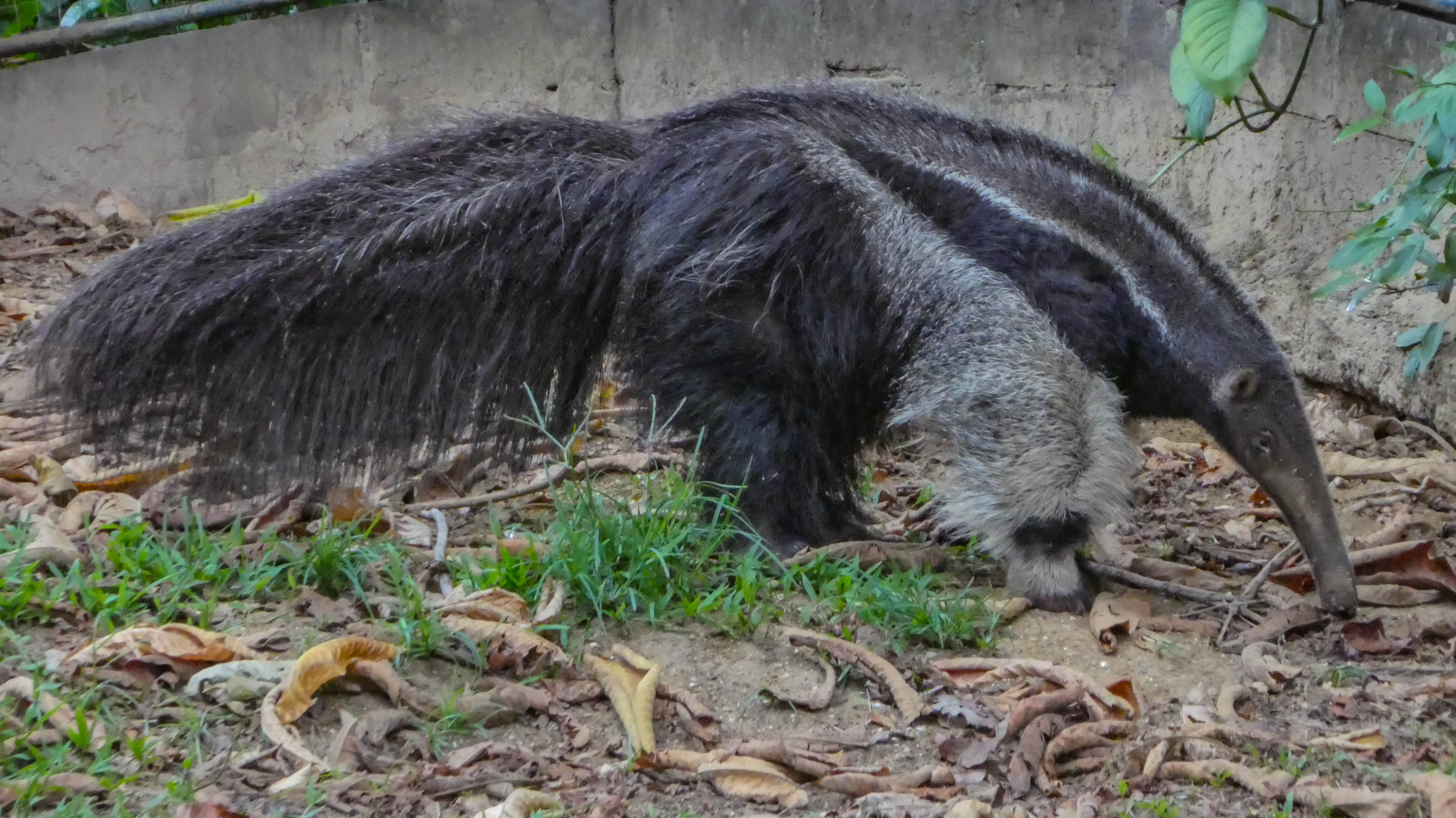
Giant Anteater
