= Stanley Franker =

Dutch tennis coach

- Born: 1945 (age 80–81); Paramaribo, Suriname
- Education: University of Southern California
- Occupation: Tennis captain
- Organization: Netherlands Davis Cup team

Stanley Franker (born 1945 in Paramaribo, Suriname) is a former national tennis captain of the Netherlands Davis Cup team.

After becoming the top ranked tennis player of Suriname, Franker received a scholarship for the University of Southern California. There he studied social psychology and was a member of the college tennis team under the guidance of coach George Toley. While in Los Angeles Franker became the personal tennis instructor of several prominent figures, including the actor Sidney Poitier. With a Masters in Physical Education Franker became captain of the Austrian Davis Cup team, where he helped Thomas Muster develop his game.

From 1986 to 1998 Franker was captain of the Netherlands Davis Cup team and led the team with players such as Richard Krajicek, Paul Haarhuis, Jacco Eltingh and Jan Siemerink from the European Zone to the World Group.
