= Arya Samaj in Suriname =

AUM or OM is considered by the Arya Samaj to be the highest and most proper name of God.

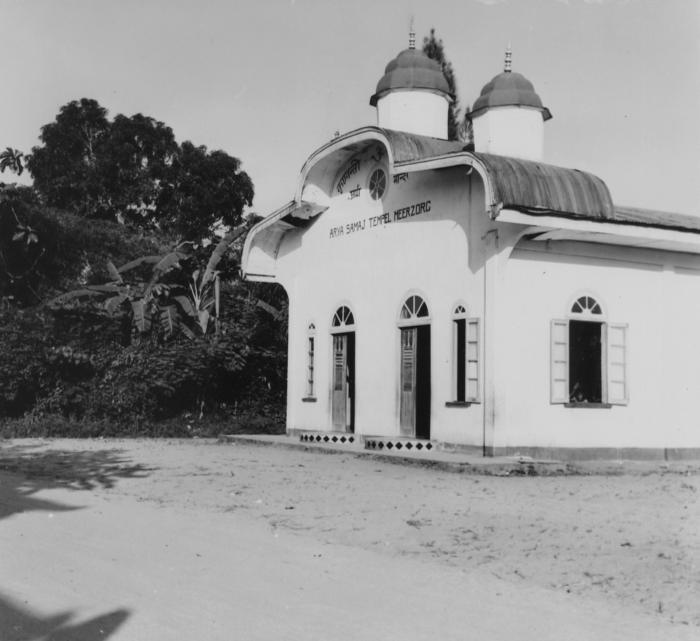
An old image of Arya Samaj temple in Meerzorg

In Suriname, the Hindu population had split, with roughly 20% following the teachings of Swami Dayanand Saraswati, founder of the Ārya Samāj, and 80% following the Sanatan Dharm. According to the census of 2012 the number of Ārya Samājĩs is 16,661. The arrival of Arya Samaj preachers in Suriname, in 1929, caused a rift in the Hindu community, between the followers of Sanātanī and the Ārya Samāj.

== History ==
The Ārya Samāj was initially established in Suriname in 1911, when Professor Bhai Parmānand, a Vedic missionary from India, visited the West Indies. Various local Ārya Samāj associations were established in the Surinamese villages in these years. The arrival of another preacher from India, Pandit (Note: Pandit means priest in Caribbean Hinduism.) Mehtā Jaimīnī, on 15 June 1929, led to the formation of an umbrella organisation, the Arya Dewakar Maha Sabha, or in Dutch the Vereniging Arya Diwaker on 29 September 1929. Mostly the organisation is briefly called Arya Diwaker. Arya Diwaker means 'Aryan Sun'. On 5 February 1930, the organisation was registered as a religious body. In 1932 Arya Diwaker started the training of Vedic priests and on 28 October 1933 it opened an orphanage and boarding school named Swami Dayanand Orphanage.

The emergence of the Ārya Samāj caused much trouble between the adherents of the new movement, referred to as Ārya Samājīs, and the followers of the Sanātan Dharm, who wished to remain loyal to the tradition of their ancestors. There were fierce debates and sometimes even fights between them. However, according to the Surinamese Muslim East-Indian Rahman Khan the two parties found each other in attacking together a new enemy in 1933. Now they started to organise joint actions against the Muslims, because they slaughtered cows, animals the Hindus regard as very holy. In the end the actions resulted in a boycott of Muslims by the Hindus. It was not before 1943 that the boycott was stopped. However, according to Ellen Bal and Kathinka Sinha Kerkhoff 'the movement was not very widespread' and 'did not encompass all the members of the two groups'.

In 1936 Arya Diwaker built a temple, but it lasted until 1947 before the house of worship was officially inaugurated. One year later, in 1948, the organisation established the Arya Mahila Samaj (Arya Women's Society), which assisted in the orphanage and in Vedic preaching. In the same year the first female pandit was ordained. And in 1958 a second orphanage was built.

== Promotion of Hindi ==
The organisation owns a number of schools where Hindi and Dutch are taught. In later years Hindi teachers from Surinam have travelled to the Netherlands, where many inhabitants of Suriname moved to in the 1970s and 1980s, to promote the language. A Hindi periodical, Arya Diwaker, is also being published.

== Other Aryan Organisations ==
In 1934 the Vedic missionary Pandit Āyodhyā Prasād arrived in Suriname on the invitation of Mātā Mahādevī and her husband Pandit Gosāīn Rampersad Sukul to train Vedic preachers. Pandit Sukul and his wife built a new Aryan mandir in Paramaribo, but they refused to put this house of worship under the umbrella of Arya Diwaker. On 13 October 1935 they founded a new umbrella organisation, the Arya Pratinidhi Sabha Suriname. Although it lasted until 17 April 1945 before the organisation obtained official recognition from the Dutch colonial authorities, Pandit Sukul and his wife succeeded in getting the recognition of their sabhā as the official national Aryan organisation of Suriname from the international Aryan umbrella organisation Sarvadeshik Arya Pratinidhi Sabha. This meant a heavy blow to Arya Diwaker. Shortly later, however, Arya Diwaker was also accepted as a representative member of the Sarvadeshik Arya Pratinidhi Sabha, so that the tiny country of Suriname became the only country with two member organisations!

In the 1950s the Arya Pratinidhi Sabha Suriname also founded an orphanage and boarding school which they named after Mahatmā Gandhi. During these years this organisation had good contacts with the Surinamese political parties including the VHP, the party of the East-Indians in Suriname.

Already in 1947 a Caribbean Vedic Parishad was established on the initiative of Solomon Moosai-Maharaj, one of the prominent members of the Arya Pratinidhi Sabha of Trinidad. Every year the council held a meeting of representatives of the Arya Pratinidhi Sabha Suriname, the American Aryan League of Guyana and the Arya Pratinidhi Sabha of Trinidad. However, although the Vedic Parishad made a good start, it also knew long periods of inactivity.

On 25 November 1951 another Aryan organisation was founded, the Shrimati Prantik Arya Pratinidhi Sabha Suriname with Pandit Ramdew Raghoebier in a major position. Later some other Aryan organisations were founded, most of them with one temple and sometimes also a school.

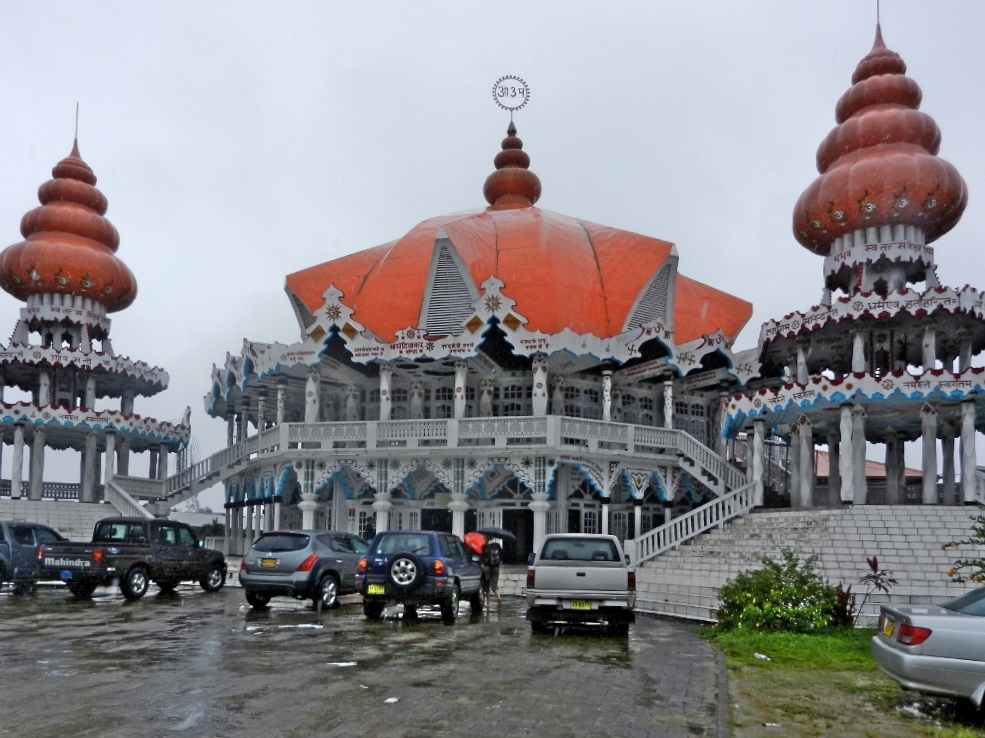
Arya Diwaker Temple, Paramaribo, Suriname

In 1970 an attempt for more co-ordination was made. The Arya Diwaker, Arya Pratinidhi Sabha Suriname and Shrimati Prantik Arya Pratinidhi Sabha Suriname formed the Ved Prachar Arya Mahamandal Suriname (VPAMS). But although another organisation, the Jagrat Arya Mandal, joined this co-operation body in 1984, it ended in a failure.

In the 1990s the Arya Pratinidhi Sabha Suriname still existed, but its orphanage and boarding school was closed and its temple fell apart. Nowadays there is nothing left of its house of worship.

Today Arya Diwaker dominates the Aryan scene in Suriname. This is confirmed by the opening by Arya Diwaker of Suriname's probably biggest and most beautiful Hindu temple in Paramaribo on 11 February 2001. The organisation counts fifteen mandirs all over Suriname, whereas three other mandirs are associated with it. Arya Dewaker also has a school organisation which runs five primary schools, three schools for vocational training and three secondary schools.
