= Arya Diwaker =

Hindu temple in Paramaribo, Suriname

Coordinates: 5.819631°N 55.17489°W

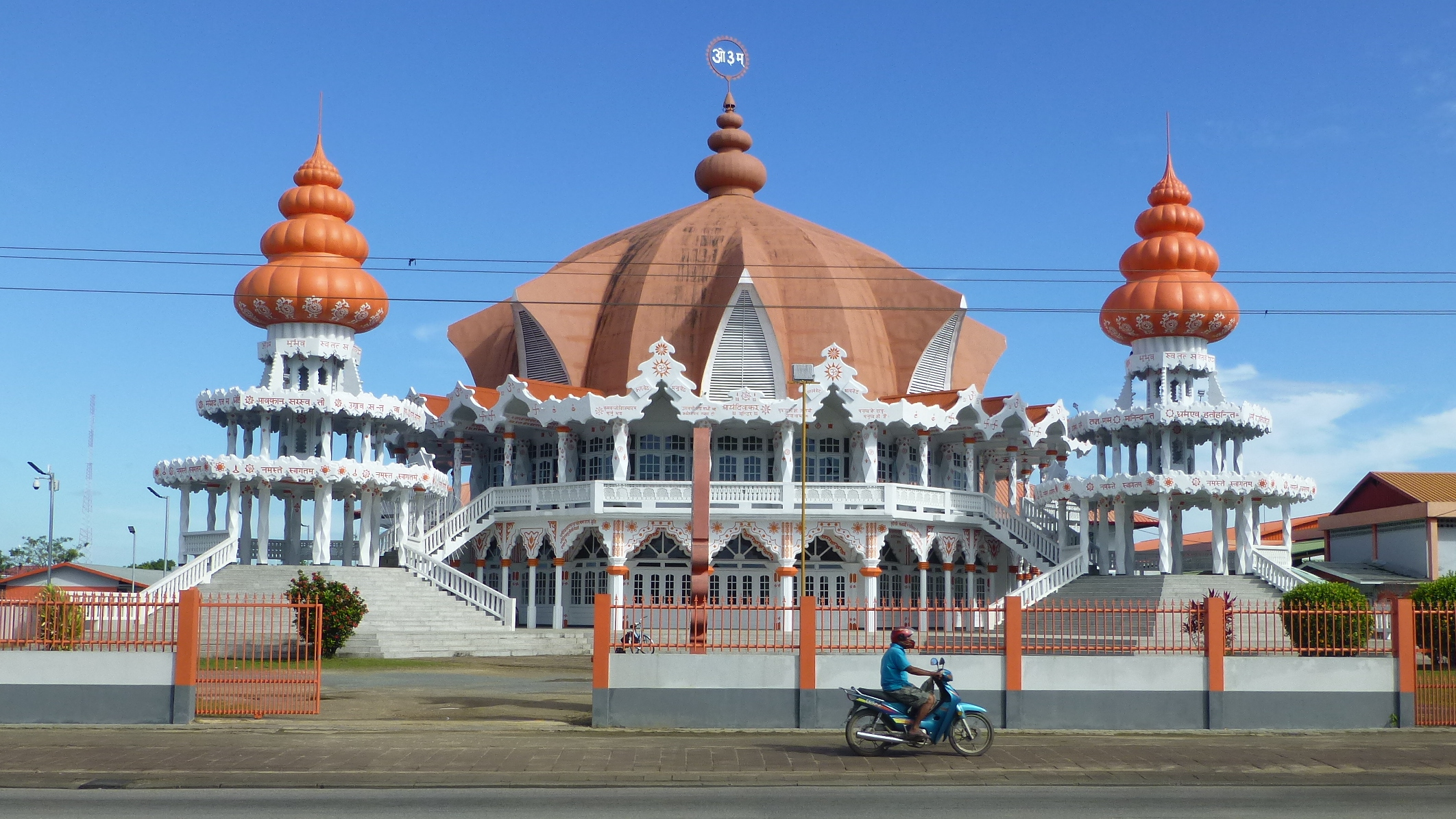
The exterior of the Arya Diwaker temple

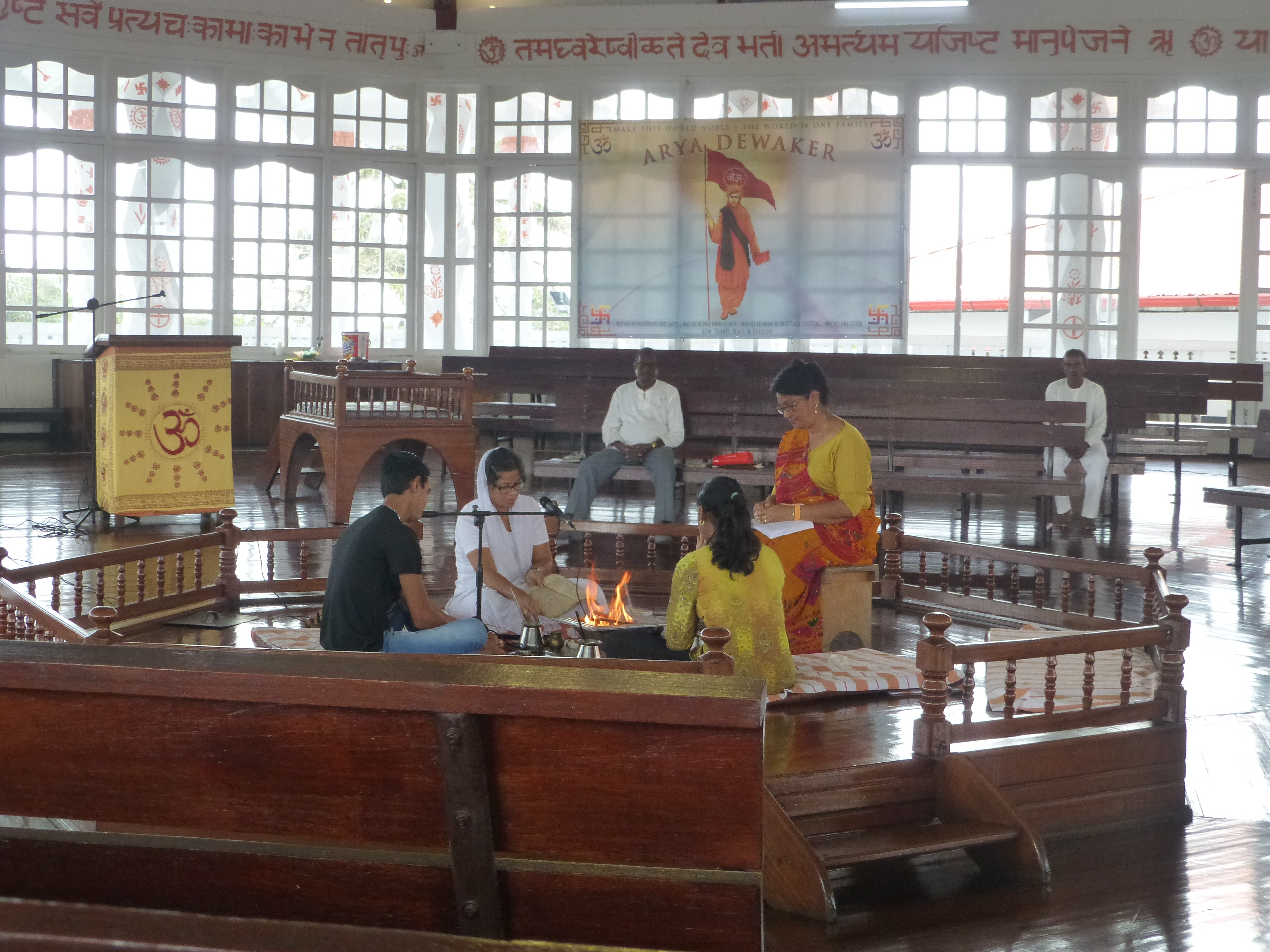
The interior of the Arya Diwaker temple during the fire ceremony (Yajna)

Arya Diwaker (Hindi: आर्य दिवाकर) is a Hindu association that built the biggest mandir (Hindu temple) of Suriname. The temple attracts many visitors, both Hindus and non-Hindus, coming from Suriname and from all over the world. It is located in the city centre fields in Paramaribo.

== Name ==
The temple was originally named Arya Dewaker. In 2022, the spelling of its name was corrected to Arya Diwaker. Arya Diwaker means 'Aryan Sun' in Hindi.

== History ==
The temple was officially opened on 11 February 2001. Since Arya Diwaker is the most important section of the Arya Samaj in Suriname today, it is reasonable to regard this house of worship as the main temple of the 16,661 Hindus who are said to belong this Hindu reform movement inspired by Swami Dayananda Sarasvati (1823-1883).

Arya Diwaker was founded on 29 September 1929 on the initiative of Pandit Mehtā Jaimīnī, an Ārya Samājī who arrived from India at the time. On 5 February 1930 the association received formal recognition from the Dutch colonial government.

In 1936 the association constructed its first mandir, a temple, in which the members could convene and hold the ceremonies around a Vedic fire, which are characteristic for the Arya Samaj. However, it lasted until 1947 before the temple was officially inaugurated. An Aryan temple, moreover, has no images. Earlier they came together in classrooms which provisorily were arranged as temple halls. The house of worship constructed in 1936 was built according to the usual pattern of an Aryan temple. It was demolished in 1975 to make place for a new temple, but because of a radical change in the construction plans and financial problems due to the bad economic situation of Suriname in the 1980s and 1990s the erection of this building took around twenty years.

== Symbolism of the temple ==
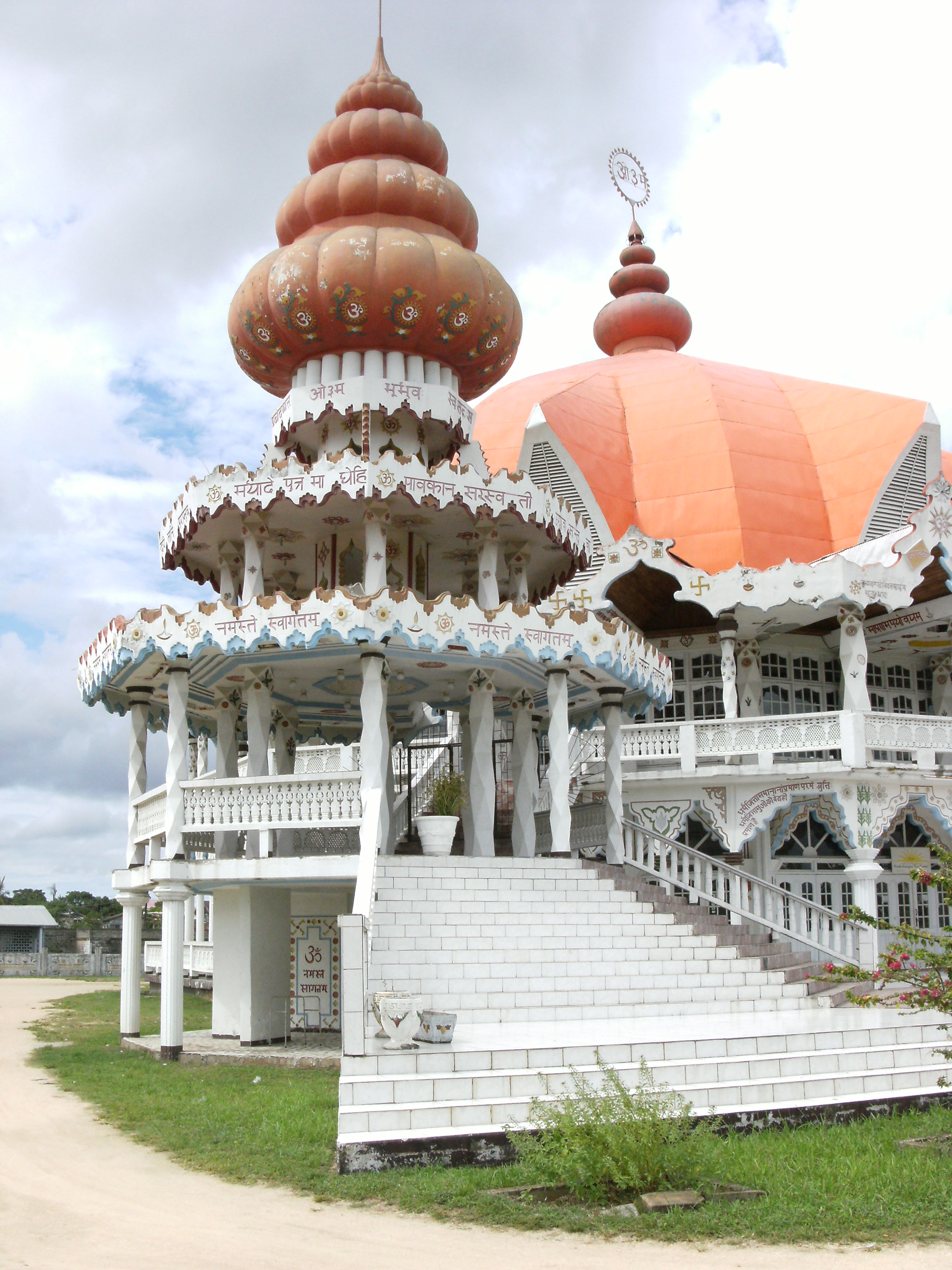
Side view of Arya Diwaker temple

The new house of worship completed in 2001 differs entirely from previous Aryan temples, as the Dutch architect Arthur E. de Groot devised in good coöperation with the members of the board and the building committee of Arya Diwaker an octagonal building of two floors. The ground floor includes various meeting rooms and a library and the upper floor is the space where the ceremonies are performed. The place for burning the fire is in the centre of the hall, whereas the benches are placed in circles surrounding the fireplace, which emphasizes that all people attending the fire ceremony are in principle equal. The building is octagonal, so it gives the impression that it is round, which reflects the circular form of the sun, the moon and the earth. The three towers refer to the three eternal units in our universal existence: the absolute God, human being and nature. The roofs of the two smaller towers and the tower on the big dome of the temple all have four floors, a number referring to the four Vedas, the oldest scriptures of Hinduism. The building does not contain any image of a divinity, since the worship of images is forbidden in the Ārya Samāj. Swastikas, Om-syllables and Sanskrit and Hindi sentences in devanagari script are painted on the walls and the ceilings. Some of these texts have a ritual character, such as the Gayatri Mantra, a holy formula derived from the Rig Veda (3,62,10), while other sentences are ethical exhortations derived, for example, from the Manusmrti (Mānava Dharmashāstra). The swastika stands for salvation and the Om-syllable refers to the absolute God, whereas a recitation of Vedic verses is considered to be very powerful.

The architect wished to erect a 'tropical temple', in which the qualities of the buildings in Suriname with their large eaves and verandas and their white painted checkered windows can be recognized. At the same time, the architecture is clearly inspired by the forms and patterns of the era of the Moghuls in India and the time of the Moors in Spain. Some pillars could come directly from the Red Fort in Agra.

During the restoration of 2016-2018 the ceiling is covered with white synthetic plates, which makes the temple room much lighter. Unfortunately the southern fence including its mantras is removed to make space for a parking place for a nearby supermarket.

== Literature ==
Freek L. Bakker, The Arya Dewaker Mandir in Paramaribo: A Hindu Temple with a Message, Electronic Paper Series in Hindu Studies 2, E-paper, World Heritage Press Inc., Québec 2015, https://dspace.library.uu.nl/handle/1874/320839
