= Audrey Christiaan =

Surinamese board member, activist and politician

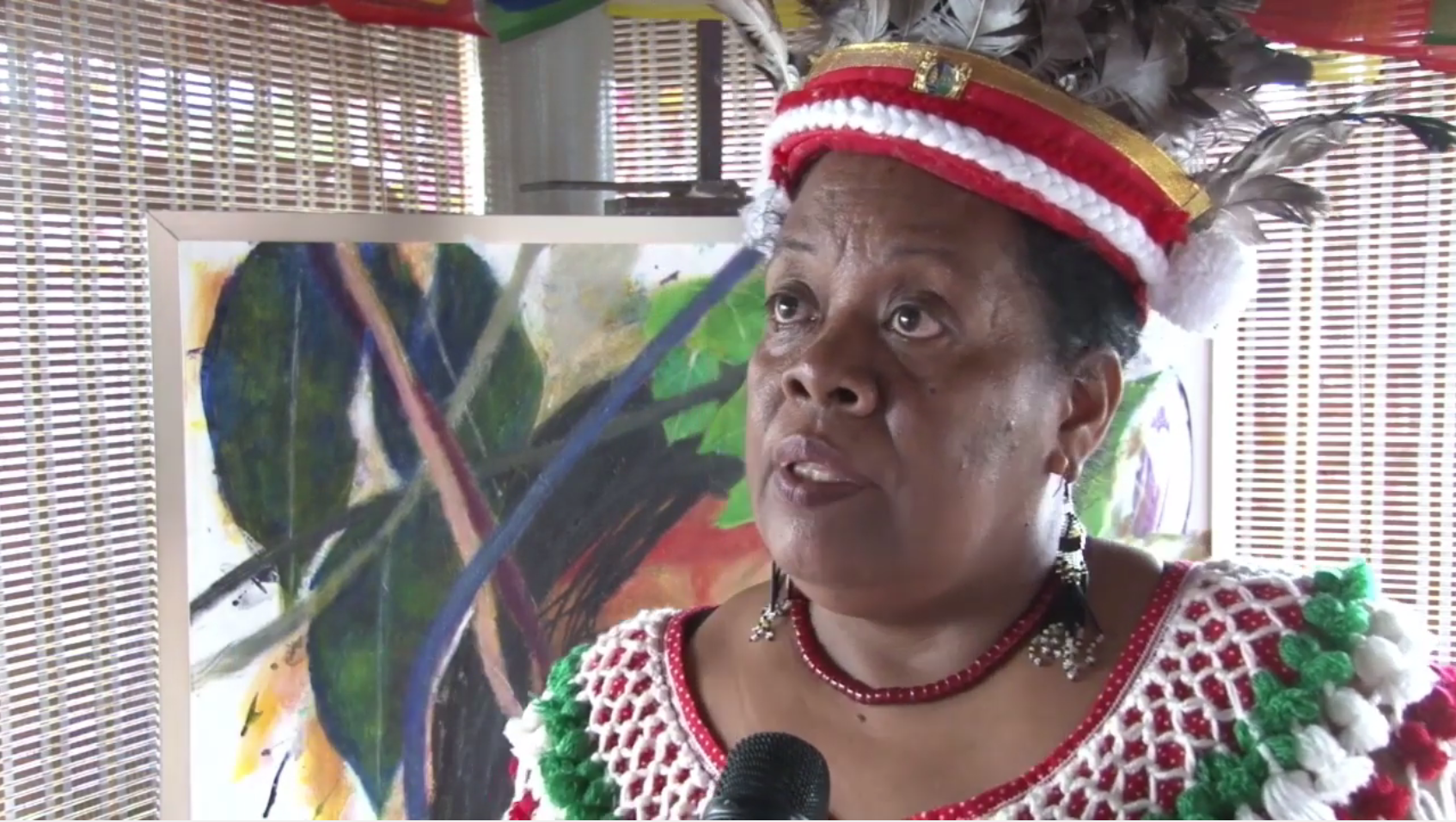
- Occupations: Environmentalist; Indigenous rights activist; Politician
- Political party: Party for Law and Development (PRO)

Audrey Christiaan is a Surinamese indigenous and environmental activist and politician. She is a member of the board of the Party for Law and Development (PRO) and in the 2020 elections she was a candidate in Paramaribo.

== Biography ==
Christiaan is a daughter of the indigenous activist Thelma Christiaan-Bigiman. In 2011 she took over her mother's chairmanship of the Indigenous Social-Cultural Association: Juku Jume Mar. Thelma was actively involved in the Association of Indigenous Village Heads of Suriname (VIDS).

In 2015, she established the Platform for Unity and Solidarity for Alliance and Progress (ESAV) (nl). On 21 January 2015 in Paramaribo the party proclaimed a 15-point programme. One of the central points of the programme was the recognition of indigenous peoples in the Constitution of Suriname as its first inhabitants, as well as supporting the examination of events in Surinamese history from the perspective of indigenous peoples. Conservation and education are central policies in ESAV. In 2017 she joined other Caribbean feminists as a panellist at the conference: "Towards a Politics of Accountability: Caribbean Feminisms, Indigenous Geographies, Common Struggles".

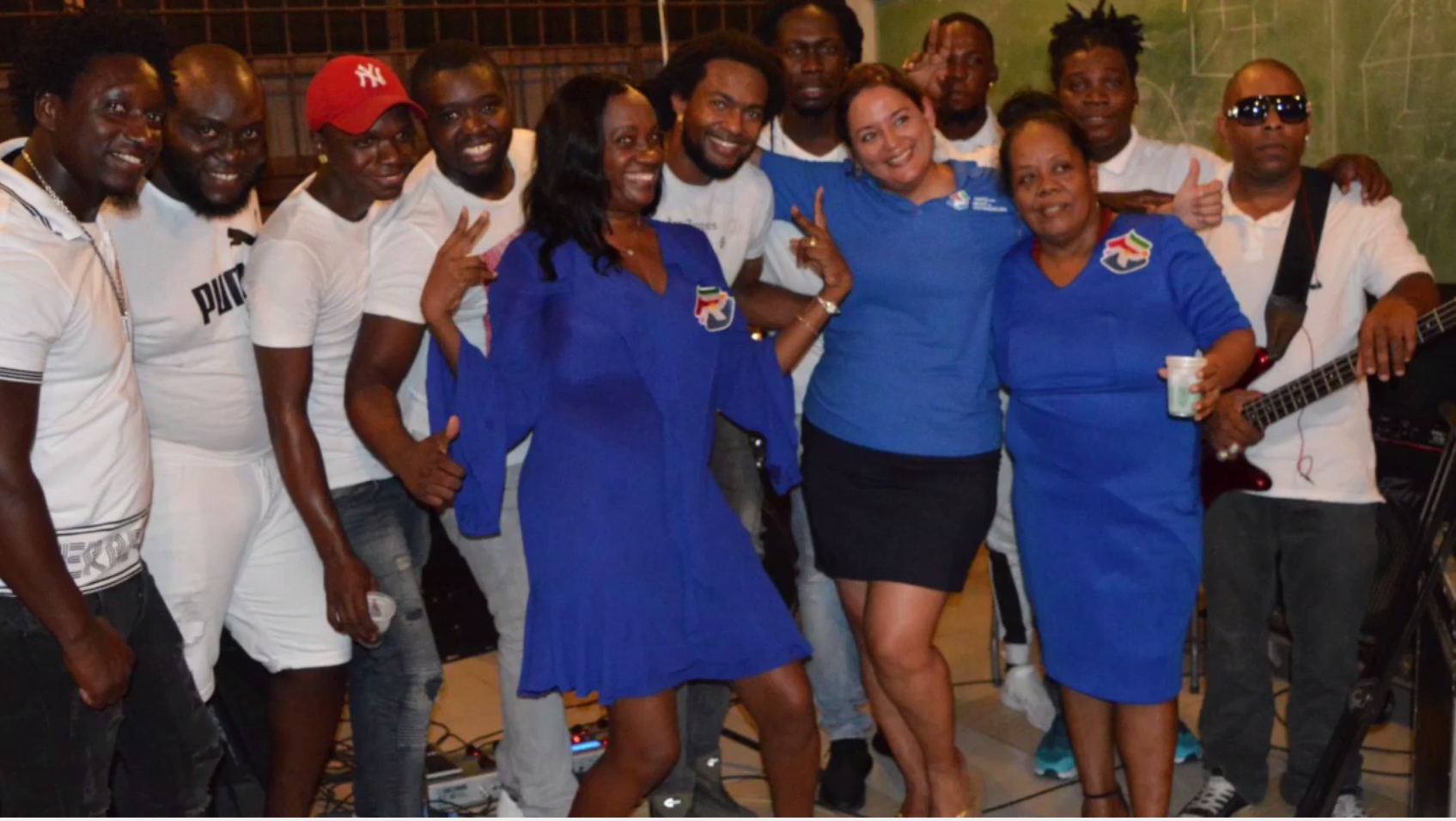
PRO members in Lob Makandra 2019

Christiaan left the role of chairperson at ESAV to focus on a political career in March 2019. She continued as chairperson of Juku Jume Mar. She was elected a member of the board of the Party for Law and Development (PRO). She joined the PRO because its policies on indigenous rights aligned with her own priorities. In Suriname's 2020 elections she was a candidate in the Paramaribo district. However, the PRO party did not acquire any seats.
