= Rainville, Suriname =

Rainville
- Resort
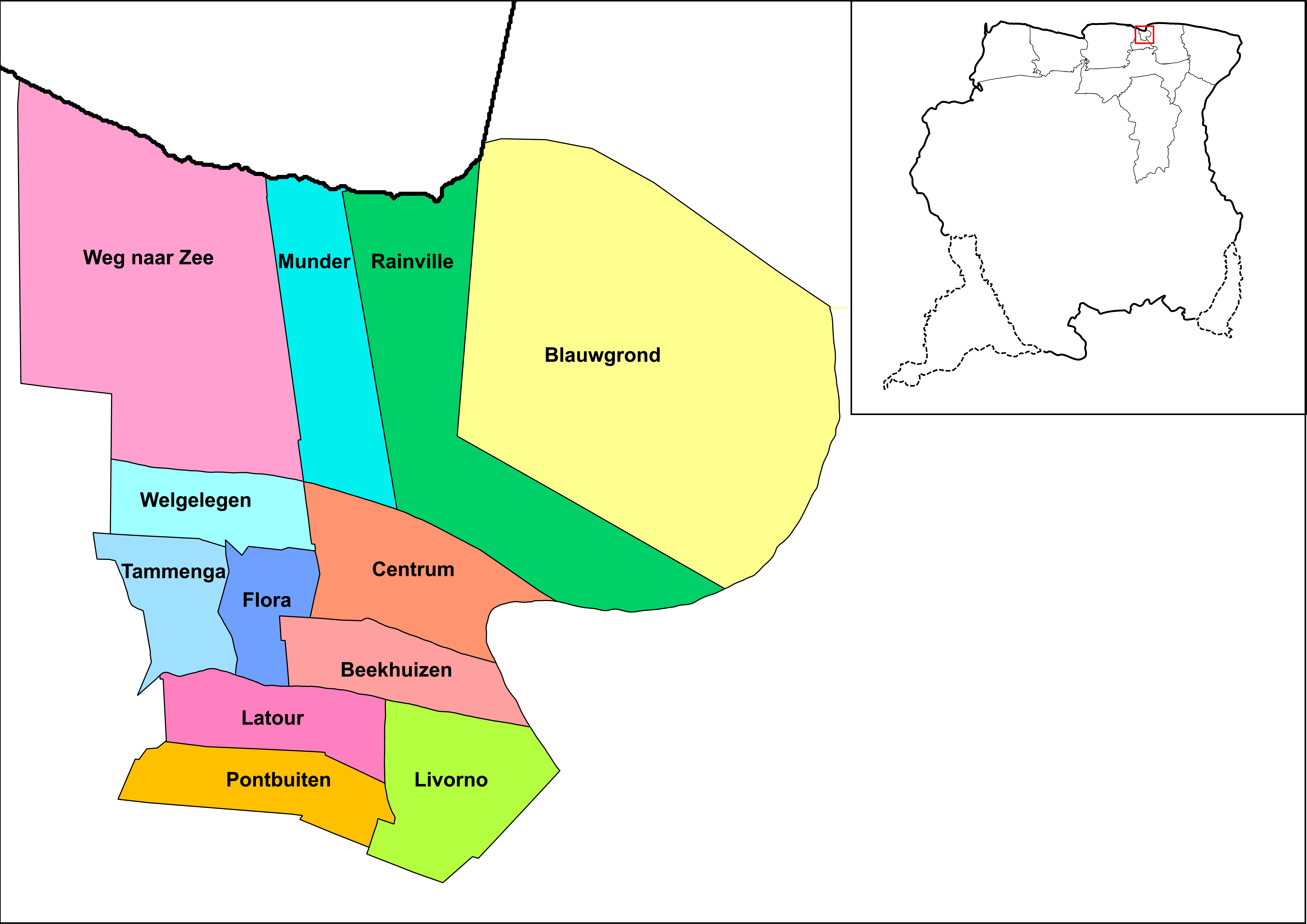
- Map showing the resorts of Paramaribo District. Rainville
- Coordinates: 5.8340377°N 55.1597021°W
- Country: Suriname
- District: Paramaribo District

Area
  - Total: 31 km^{2} (12 sq mi)
- Elevation: 0 m (0 ft)

Population (2012)
  - Total: 22,747
  - Density: 730/km^{2} (1,900/sq mi)
- Time zone: UTC-3 (AST)

Rainville is a resort in Suriname, located in the Paramaribo District. Its population at the 2012 census was 22,747.

The Rainville resort is home to the Paramaribo Zoo. The zoo was opened in 1972. Unlike most zoos, about 75% of the animals are local wild animals who had been either confiscated or were former pets.

== Combé ==
Map of Combé (1905)

Rainville is home to the Combé neighbourhood. It started as a plantation, and was turned into a village in 1791. The neighbourhood has been named after Nicolaas Combé, a French huguenot and one of the early colonists, who was persuaded to move to Suriname from Berbice.

It is the oldest neighbourhood of Paramaribo, and contains small wooden houses with their own character. When the city centre was designated a Unesco World Heritage Site, Combé was listed as a buffer area.
