= Munder =

Munder may refer to:

- Munder, Suriname, a resort (municipality)
- Munder, Udupi, Karnataka, India, a village
- Bad Münder, Lower Saxony, Germany, a town
- Eugen Munder (1899–1952), Nazi official
