= Conservation International Suriname =

Suriname programme of Conservation International

- Abbreviation: CI Suriname
- Formation: 29 December 1992
- Type: Country programme
- Headquarters: Paramaribo, Suriname
- Region served: Suriname
- Fields: Biodiversity conservation; protected areas; conservation finance; coastal resilience; ecosystem restoration
- Parent organization: Conservation International
- Website: suriname.conservation.org

Conservation International Suriname (CI Suriname) is the Suriname country programme of Conservation International. It works on biodiversity conservation and ecosystem management in Suriname.

Its work includes protected-area planning and forest conservation, mangrove restoration and coastal resilience at Weg naar Zee, a community fisheries improvement project, and community-based conservation initiatives in southern Suriname.

Its conservation finance work is linked to the Suriname Conservation Fund, a trust fund established to support protected-area management in Suriname.

== Overview ==
Conservation International-Suriname was established as a foundation under Surinamese law in 1992 and registered in 1993. Its national office is based in Paramaribo.

Its current work spans protected areas and conservation finance linked to the Central Suriname Nature Reserve and the Suriname Conservation Fund, coastal resilience and community fisheries on the Suriname coast including at Weg naar Zee, and Indigenous governance and forest-corridor initiatives in southern Suriname.

== History ==
Conservation International-Suriname was established as a foundation under Surinamese law in 1992 and registered in 1993. It has been active in Suriname since 1992 and is based in Paramaribo.

In the late 1990s, the Central Suriname Nature Reserve was established in 1998, and the Suriname Conservation Fund was established in 1999 to support protected-area management, including in the reserve.

In 2000, the reserve was inscribed as a UNESCO World Heritage Site. In the same year, a grant agreement provided up to US$2 million from Conservation International Foundation to the Suriname Conservation Foundation's trust fund. Later annual reports described the fund as continuing to support protected-area management and related conservation projects in Suriname.

Monitoring work linked to the TEAM network began in Suriname in 2004, and a Raleighvallen-area station was established in 2006. TEAM-supported monitoring in the reserve continued until 2017 and informed research and management in the Central Suriname Nature Reserve.

In 2015, Indigenous leaders proposed the South Suriname Conservation Corridor as a community effort to conserve the ecosystems within their living areas. Later work in the corridor included participatory mapping of community use zones, locally defined rules for resource use in Tiriyó and Wayana communities, and community-based Brazil nut production marketed as Tuhka. In the same period, CI Suriname and partners supported coastal protection work at Weg naar Zee.

== Programmes and operations ==
Selected programme locations in Suriname (1 Paramaribo; 2 Central Suriname Nature Reserve; 3 Weg naar Zee; 4 Alalapadu (southern Suriname))

=== Paramaribo and national programme ===
From its Paramaribo office, CI Suriname's national programme includes coastal resilience work on the Suriname coast, a community fisheries improvement project, and conservation-finance support for protected-area management.

At Weg naar Zee, coastal erosion has affected mangroves, farmland, housing and flood protection along a low-lying stretch of coast west of the Suriname River. A World Bank coastal resilience assessment identified the area as one of the coastal stretches near Paramaribo where mangroves had been heavily reduced and where shoreline retreat and flood risk had become major concerns. A Deltares analysis described the Weg naar Zee coastline as eroding for at least the last 50 years and recorded breaches in the earthen sea defence in early 2024 that inundated the hinterland and salinized drainage channels. CI Suriname and partners use sediment-trapping structures, including permeable dams, to promote sediment accretion and mangrove regrowth and to reduce erosion, and remote-sensing analysis identified renewed sediment accretion at Weg naar Zee in the mid-2010s. In 2025, coastal erosion and flooding at Weg naar Zee continued to affect farmland and housing, while mangrove-restoration work and sea-dike construction were also underway.

CI Suriname's current coastal programme also includes a Community Fisheries Improvement Project focused on improving the sustainability of artisanal driftnet fisheries and supporting food security and livelihoods for small-scale fishers.

Conservation finance work is linked to the Suriname Conservation Fund, a trust fund established in 1999 to support protected-area management, including in the Central Suriname Nature Reserve. A grant agreement signed in 2000 provided up to US$2 million from Conservation International Foundation to the Suriname Conservation Foundation's trust fund.

=== Central Suriname Nature Reserve ===
CI Suriname's work in and around the Central Suriname Nature Reserve has included protected-area planning, management support, biodiversity monitoring, and conservation finance linked to the Suriname Conservation Fund. The 1,600,000-hectare (16,000 km^{2}) reserve was established in 1998 and inscribed as a UNESCO World Heritage Site in 2000, linking the Raleighvallen, Eilerts de Haan and Tafelberg nature reserves into a single protected-area complex that represents about 11% of Suriname's national territory by area.

Management arrangements for the reserve have involved Suriname's forestry authorities and the Nature Conservation Division (Natuurbeheer), with STINASU supporting operational management and visitor services. Multi-year management plans have included zoning and related implementation measures. A research station at the base of Voltzberg supports research and monitoring and was rebuilt in 2017. Biodiversity monitoring in the reserve has been linked to the Tropical Ecology Assessment and Monitoring (TEAM) network, which became active in Suriname in 2004 and established a Raleighvallen-area station in 2006; TEAM monitoring ended in 2017.

=== Southern Suriname ===
CI Suriname's work in southern Suriname has centred on Indigenous governance and conservation planning in the South Suriname Conservation Corridor, a long-term initiative for conservation and sustainable management in the region's forests and river systems that was proposed by Indigenous leaders in 2015 and formalised through an Indigenous Declaration signed that year. Participatory mapping has been used to identify Indigenous community use zones and support conservation planning in the corridor.

The programme has also supported community rules and livelihood activities in the corridor area. A handbook sets out locally defined rules for resource use in Tiriyó and Wayana communities in southern Suriname, and community-based economic activities have included Brazil nut products marketed as Tuhka.

Selected landscapes and coastal contexts of Conservation International Suriname
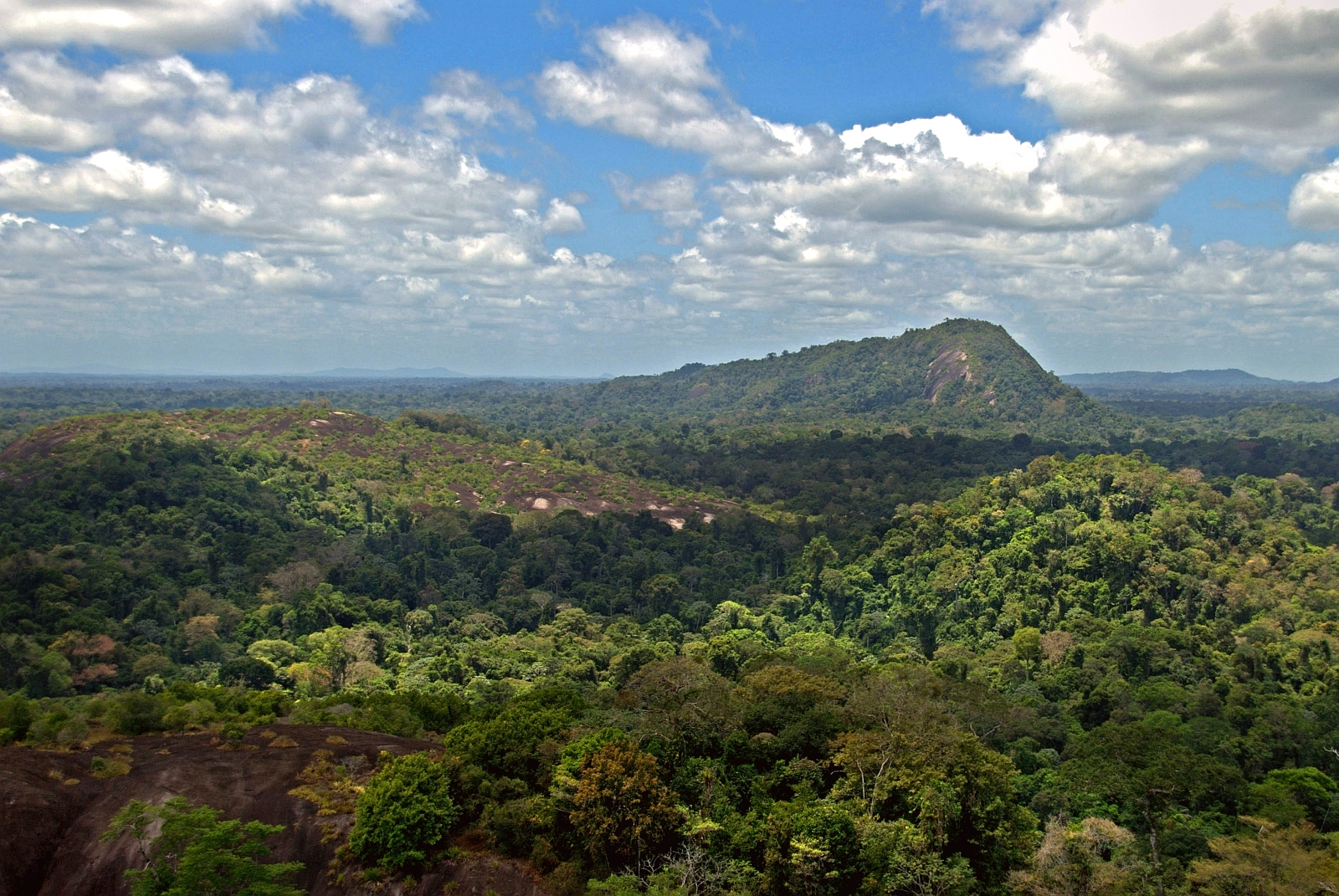
Rainforest viewed from Voltzberg in the Central Suriname Nature Reserve

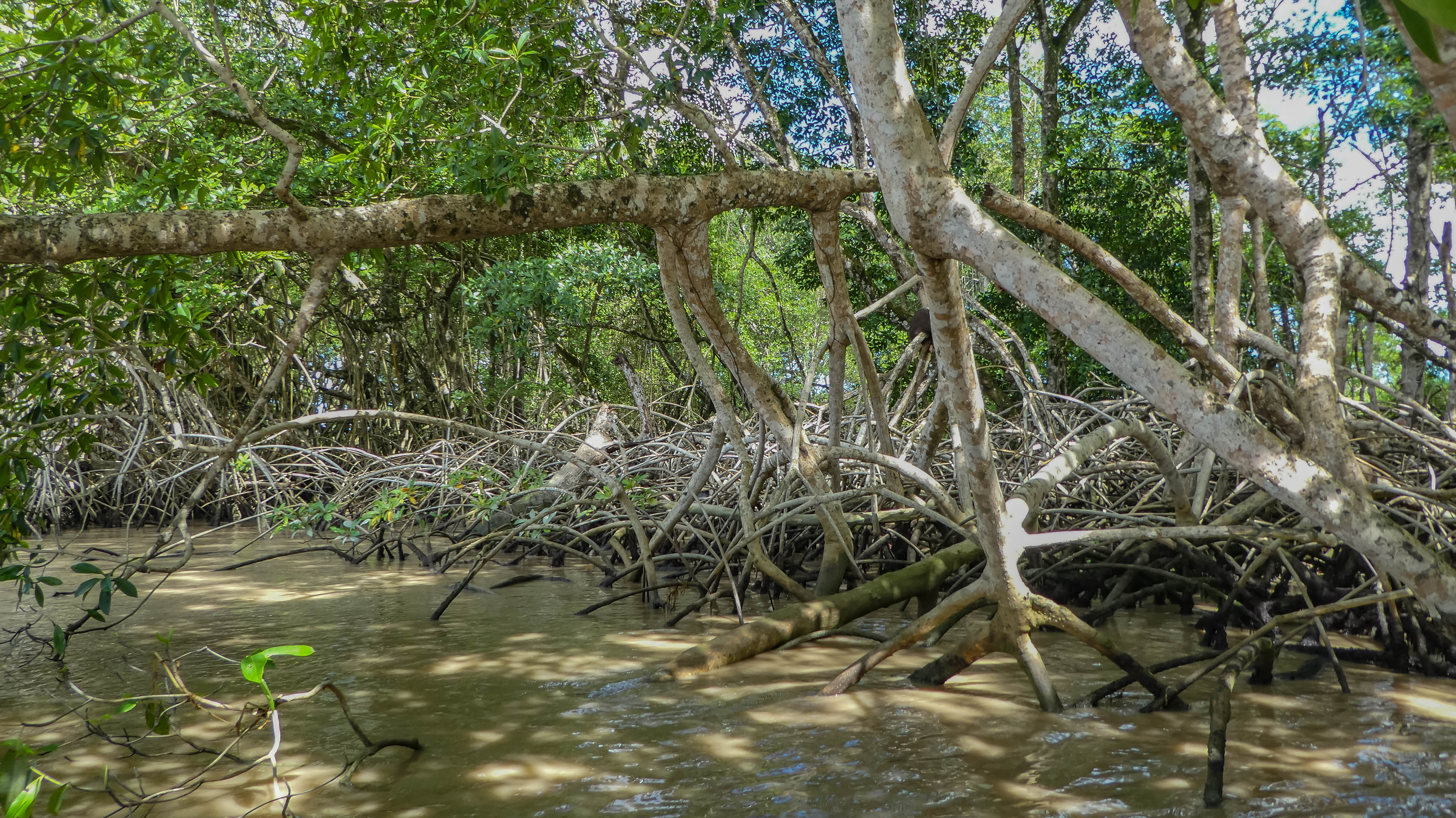
Mangrove forest in Commewijne District, representative of Suriname's coastal mangrove ecosystems

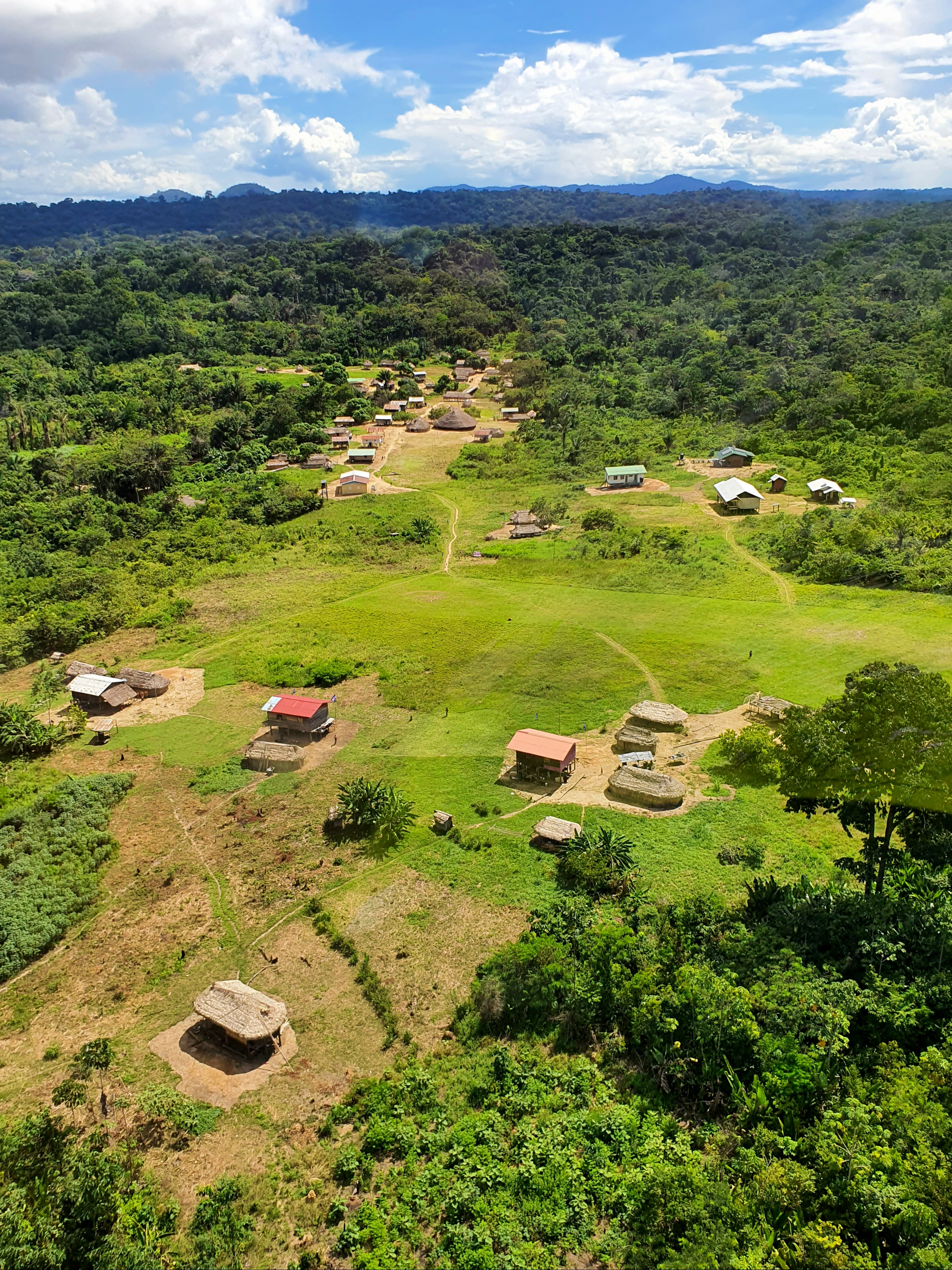
Alalapadu, a village in southern Suriname associated with South Suriname Conservation Corridor activities

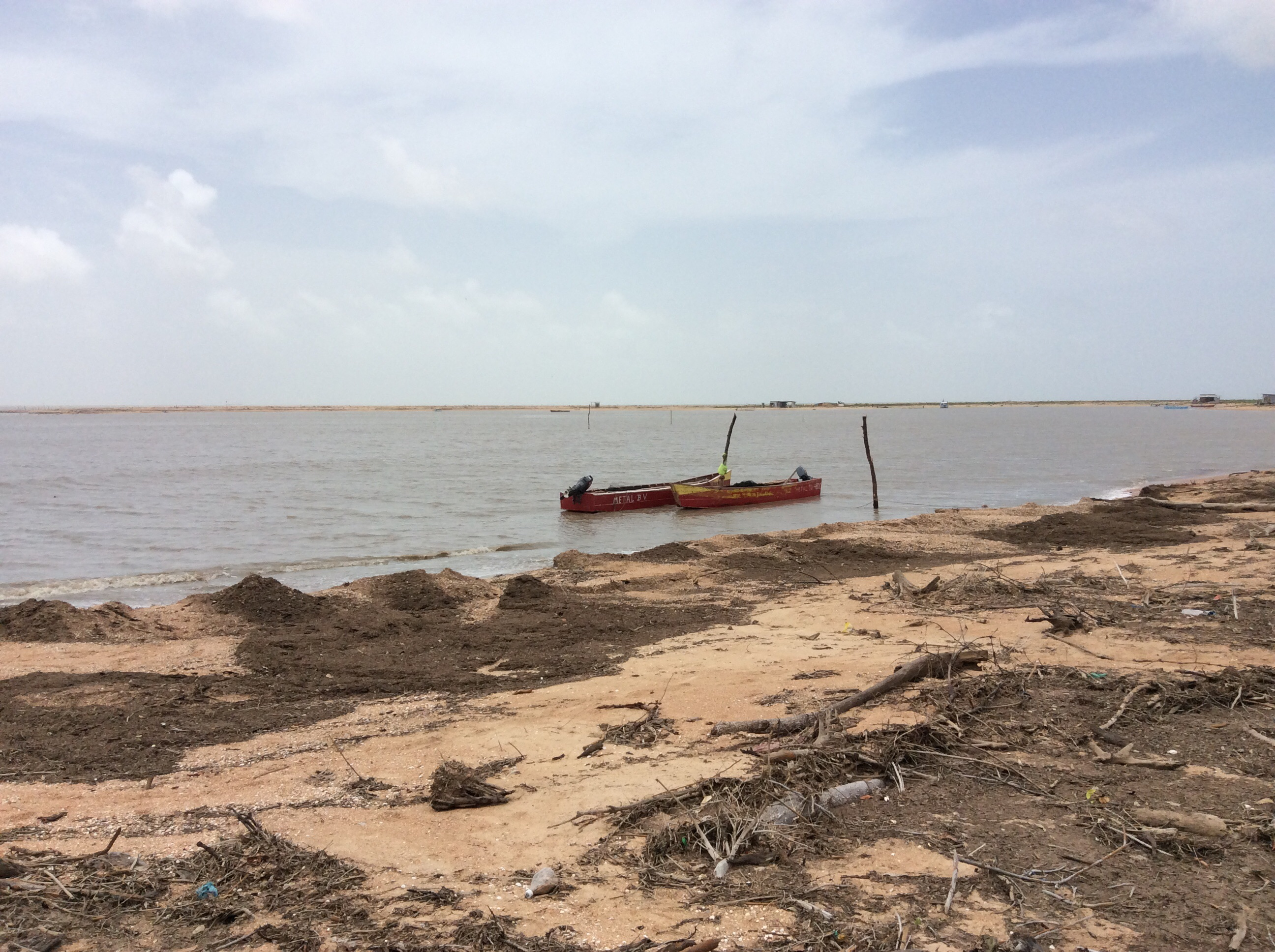
Boat at Braamspunt, a Surinamese fishing village, representing coastal fisheries contexts

== Partnerships ==
Recurring public-sector and institutional partners have included Suriname's forestry authorities and the Nature Conservation Division (Natuurbeheer) in the Central Suriname Nature Reserve, STINASU in operational management and visitor services, and the Suriname Conservation Foundation in conservation finance and protected-area support.

Other recurring collaborations have involved Indigenous leaders and Tiriyó and Wayana communities in the South Suriname Conservation Corridor, Wetlands International in coastal resilience work at Weg naar Zee, and the TEAM network in biodiversity monitoring and research in the Central Suriname Nature Reserve.

== Funding and conservation finance ==
CI Suriname's conservation-finance work has used several connected mechanisms, including the Suriname Conservation Fund trust fund, grant support linked to Conservation International and other international partners, partnership-based business support through the Green Partnership Program, and livelihood initiatives connected to forest products and small-scale fisheries.

The Suriname Conservation Fund combines an endowment model with a project-financing portfolio. In 2021, international investments returned 8.24 percent and the endowment fund closed the year at US$15,633,900, while by 2023 its investments included international stocks, bonds, money funds and cash balances together with local investments such as Staatsolie bonds and term deposits. The project-financing side of the fund also remained active: six project financing proposals and project ideas were received in 2021 and nine in 2023, with applicants screened and coached through internal review procedures before board consideration.

Trust-fund capitalisation and partnership-based financing have come from multiple sources. An agreement signed on 28 November 2000 provided for a Conservation International Foundation grant of up to US$2,000,000. A separate United Nations Development Programme trust-fund grant, financed through the Global Environment Facility and the United Nations Foundation, provided up to US$9,400,000. Another financing strand has operated through the Suriname Conservation Foundation Green Partnership Program, which began in 2010 with cooperation agreements with Telesur and DSB, counted 14 partner companies by 2015, and later continued through partner meetings and a renewed steering committee.

Livelihood-linked conservation activity has operated alongside these fund and partnership mechanisms. In southern Suriname, community-based Brazil nut products have been marketed as Tuhka, while on the coast the Community Fisheries Improvement Project has been framed as a livelihood and food-security initiative linked to more sustainable artisanal driftnet fisheries rather than as a trust-fund mechanism.

== Impact and evaluation ==
In and around the Central Suriname Nature Reserve, outputs included a statutory management plan or zoning plan, local management through STINASU staff, an available 2003 draft management plan, and research infrastructure such as the Voltzberg station. World Heritage status was assessed as having very positive impacts on conservation and on research and monitoring, together with positive impacts on management effectiveness and funding. In 2020, the reserve's overall conservation outlook was assessed as good with some concerns, with its World Heritage values described as remaining in good condition and relatively stable.

Outputs from the Suriname Coastal Protected Area Management Project included economic valuation documents, monitoring and evaluation plans for coastal protected areas, an inventory of invasive alien plant species, a mangrove educational centre, and management plans for three Multiple Use Management Areas (MUMAs). TEAM-supported monitoring in the Central Suriname Nature Reserve also generated standardized camera-trap datasets that were used in comparative studies of tropical forest mammals and biodiversity trends in protected areas; in a seven-site analysis using a common camera-trapping methodology, mammal species richness was highest at the Central Suriname Nature Reserve site, with 28 species.

The measured results were mixed. On the coast, the project was assessed as highly relevant and it produced management tools, stakeholder engagement and a basis for later coastal-resilience work, while remote-sensing analysis at Weg naar Zee identified renewed sediment accretion in the mid-2010s. At the same time, effects remained uneven: some project outputs had limited appropriation or concrete impact, coastal funding was not shown to have increased or diversified, and the lack of systematic monitoring and a mid-term evaluation reduced opportunities for adaptive management. In the Central Suriname Nature Reserve, World Heritage values were assessed as remaining in good condition and relatively stable, but monitoring was not in place at the property or buffer zone despite an identified need and low budget remained a concern. Public technical assessments also continued to identify Weg naar Zee as highly exposed to erosion and flood risk, and Deltares reported in 2024 that breaches in the earthen sea defence had inundated the hinterland and salinized drainage channels.
