= Weg naar Zee =

- Resort
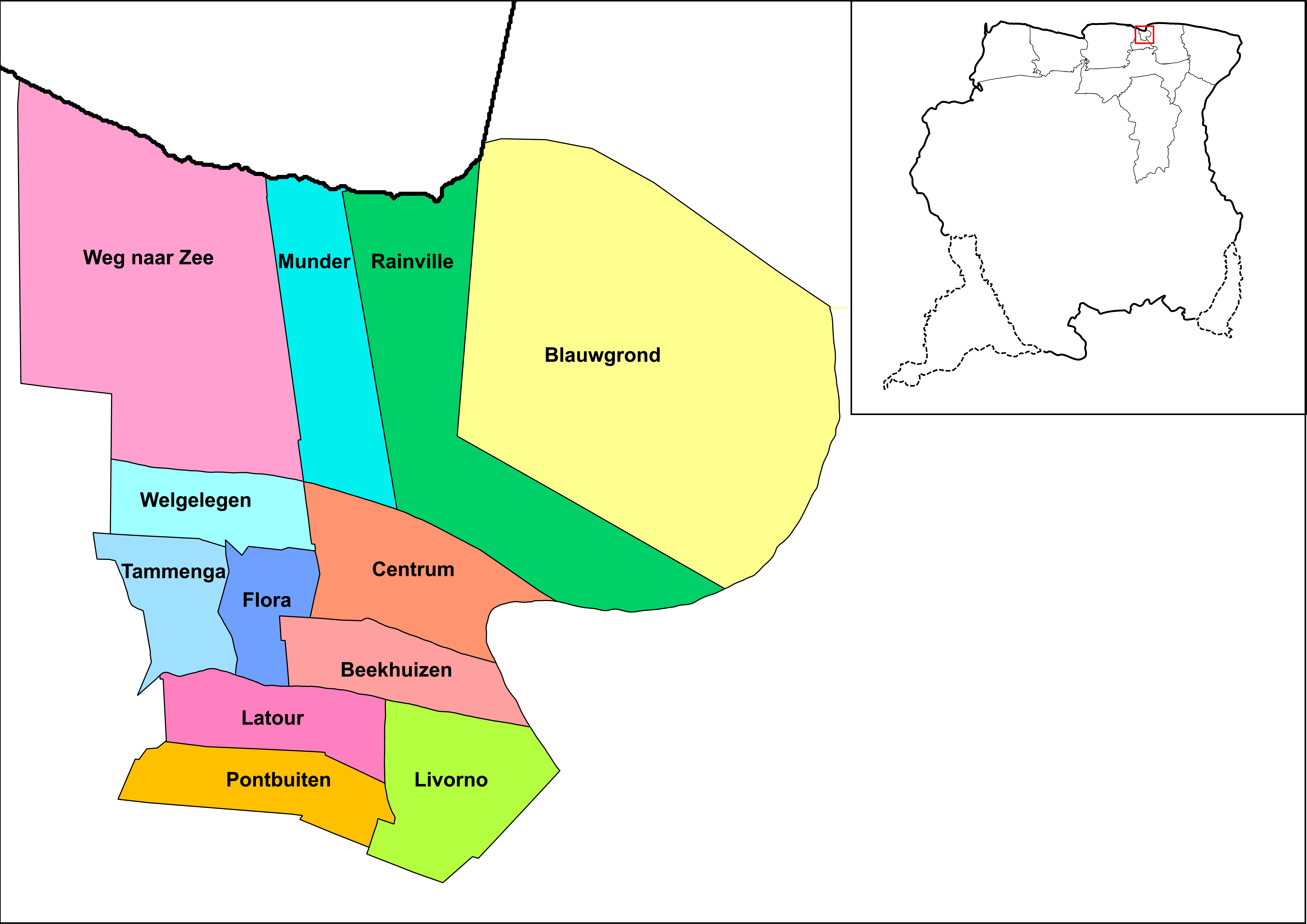
- Map showing the resorts of Paramaribo District. Weg naar Zee
- Coordinates: 5.8763°N 55.2042°W
- Country: Suriname
- District: Paramaribo District

Area
  - Total: 41 km^{2} (16 sq mi)

Population (2012)
  - Total: 16,037
  - Density: 390/km^{2} (1,000/sq mi)
- Time zone: UTC-3 (AST)

Weg naar Zee is a resort in Suriname, located in the Paramaribo District. Its population at the 2012 census was 16,037, and has a large East Indian population. The name can be translated as "road to sea", and it is indeed the road to the sea. Weg naar Zee is home to the Open Air Crematorium which opened in 1968, and there is a pilgrimage site for Hindus nearby. In 1968, oil had been discovered in Weg naar Zee, and is being exploited by Staatsolie.

== Environment ==
In 2015, a mangrove conservation effort was launched. The rising sea tide due to climate change, and the decline for the forests, increase the risk of flooding. The project aims to increase the number of mangrove forests near the coast. A part of the resort is still an agricultural area. Conservation International Suriname (CI-Suriname) and partners use sediment-trapping structures (including permeable dams) and mangrove rehabilitation to reduce coastal erosion and support mangrove regrowth. Studies have discussed lessons from permeable dams on mangrove-mud coasts and mapped mangrove dynamics along the Suriname coast using satellite data.
