= Welgelegen, Paramaribo District =

Coordinates: 5°50′24″N 55°13′13″W

Welgelegen
- Resort
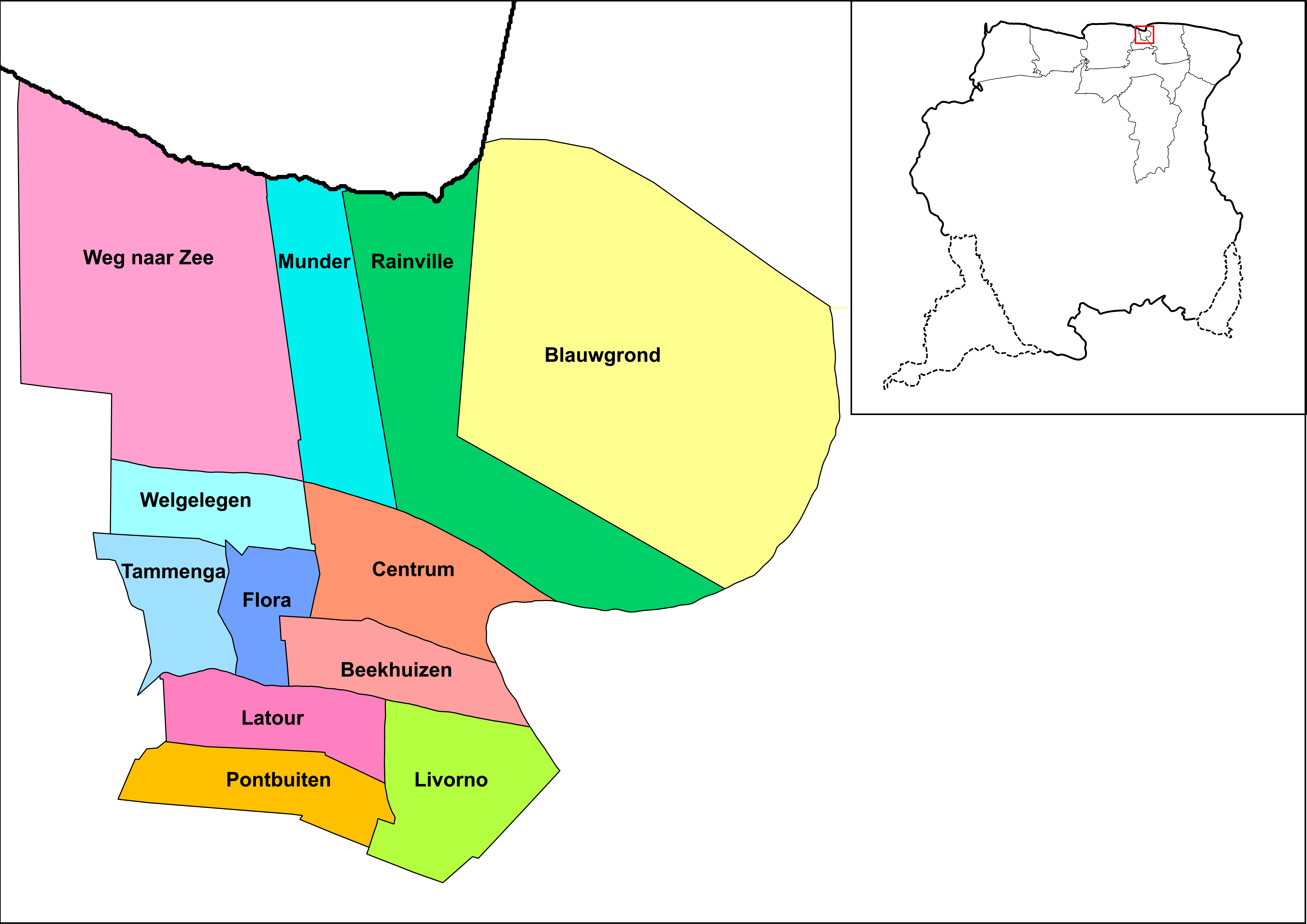
- Map showing the resorts of Paramaribo District. Welgelegen
- Country: Suriname
- District: Paramaribo District

Area
  - Total: 7 km^{2} (2.7 sq mi)

Population (2012)
  - Total: 19,304
  - Density: 2,800/km^{2} (7,100/sq mi)
- Time zone: UTC-3 (AST)

Welgelegen is a resort in Suriname, located in the Paramaribo District. Its population at the 2012 census was 19,304.
