= Flora, Suriname =

Coordinates: 5°48′N 55°12′W

Flora
- Resort
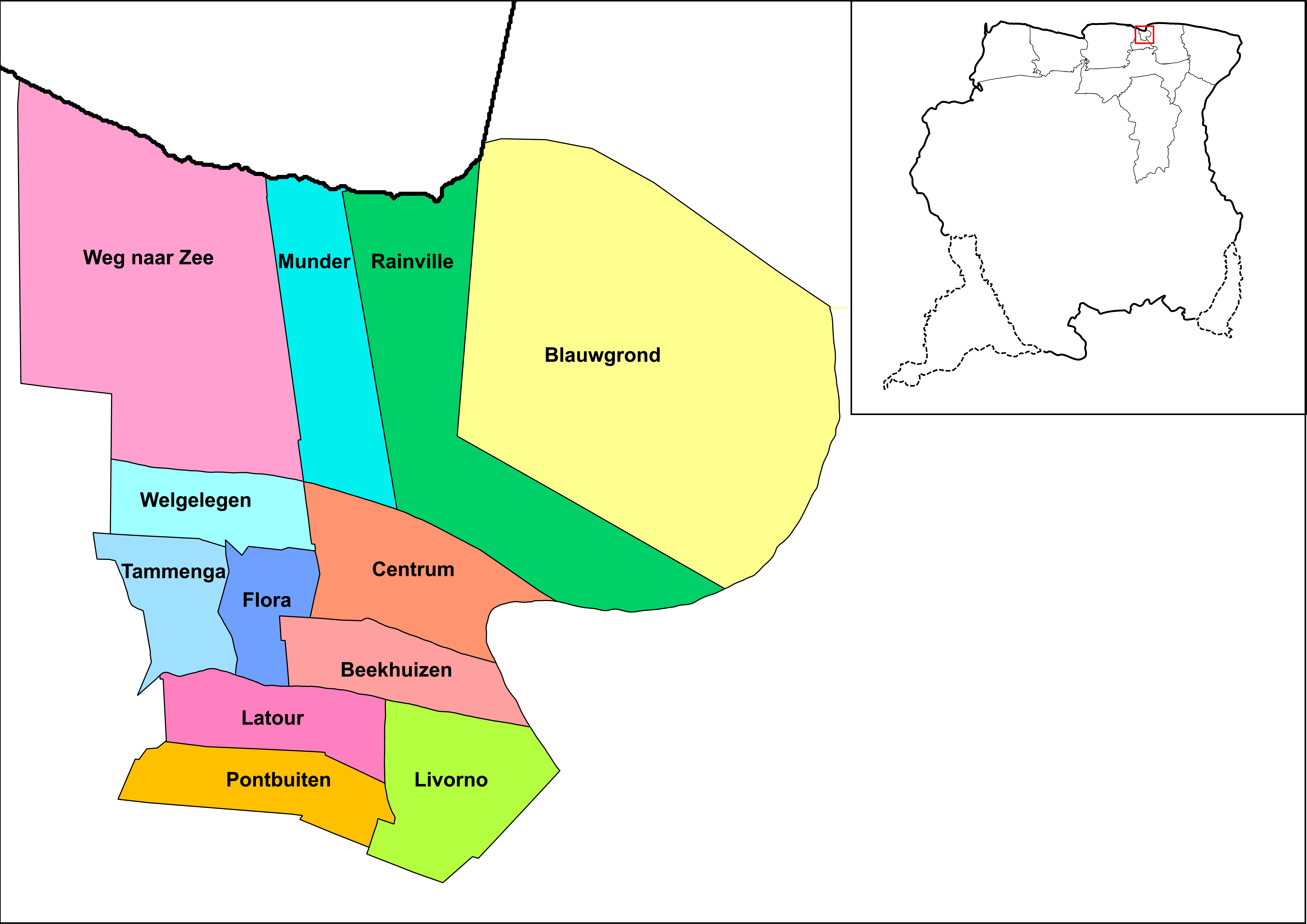
- Map showing the resorts of Paramaribo District. Flora
- Country: Suriname
- District: Paramaribo District

Area
  - Total: 4 km^{2} (1.5 sq mi)
- Elevation: 4 m (13 ft)

Population (2012)
  - Total: 19,538
  - Density: 4,900/km^{2} (13,000/sq mi)
- Time zone: UTC-3 (AST)

Flora is a resort in Suriname, located in the Paramaribo District. Its population at the 2012 census was 19,538. Flora is both the name of the resort and the neighbourhood within the resort. Flora was founded as a wood plantation in 1809.

The neighbourhood Uitvlugt is located in the resort. Uitvlugt used to be a stronghold of the Boeroes, the white farmers, and is still a wealthy neighbourhood.

== Notable people ==
- Ietje Paalman-de Miranda (1936–2020), mathematician and professor.
