= Paramaribo District =

District of Suriname

Paramaribo
- District
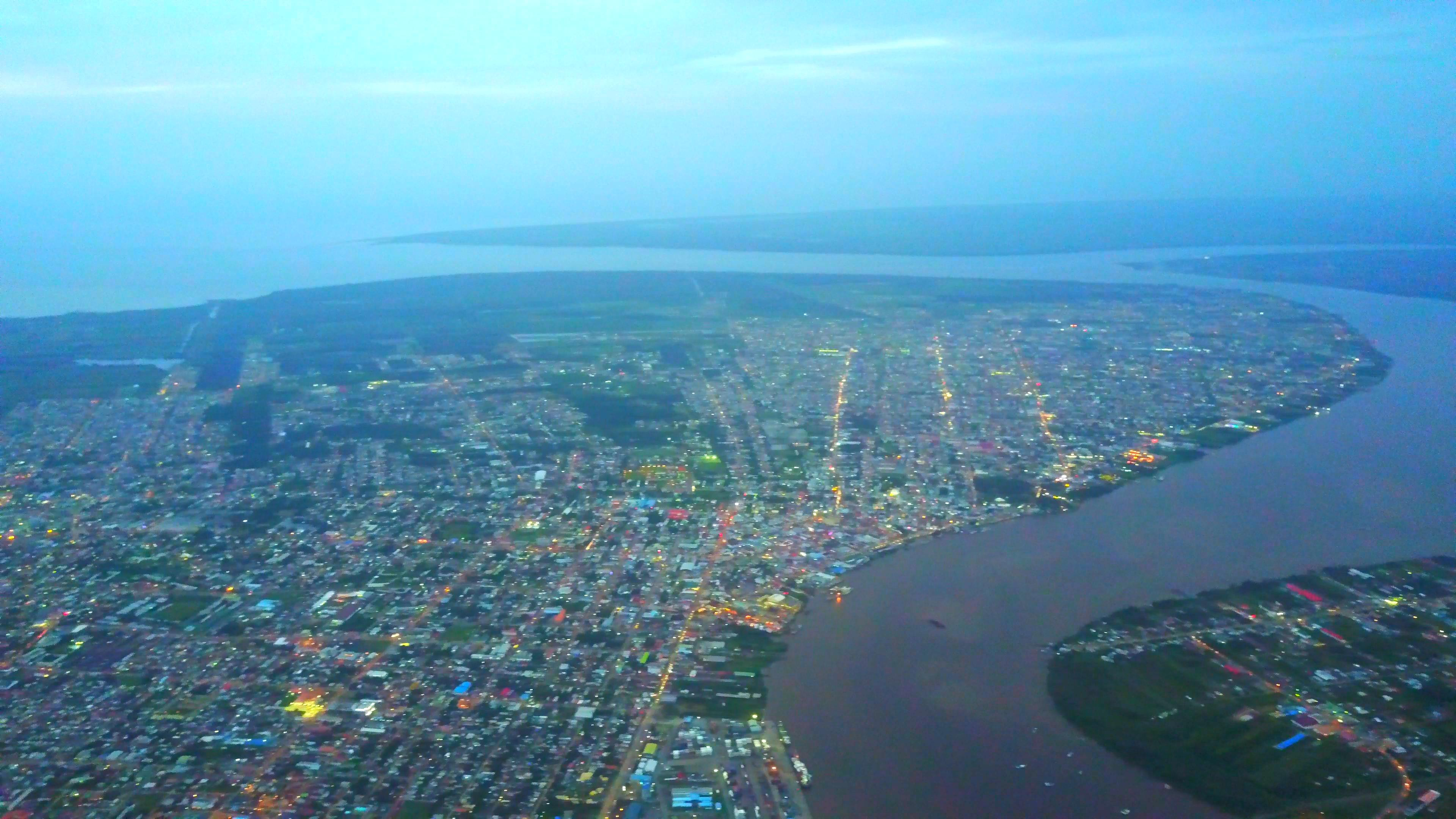

- Map of Suriname showing Paramaribo district
- Coordinates: 5°50′0″N 55°10′0″W
- Country: Suriname
- Capital: Paramaribo

Area
  - Total: 182 km^{2} (70 sq mi)

Population (2012 census)
  - Total: 240,924
  - Density: 1,320/km^{2} (3,430/sq mi)
- Time zone: UTC-3
- HDI (2017): 0.752 high

Paramaribo is a district of Suriname, coextensive with the capital city of Paramaribo.

Paramaribo district has a population of 240,924, almost half the population of the entire country, and an area of 182 km^{2}.

The area was first colonised by the British in the 17th century with the construction of Fort Willoughby. This fort was later taken by the Netherlands and renamed Fort Zeelandia. The area, and the city of Paramaribo, switched between Dutch and British control until the Treaty of Breda at the end of the Second Anglo-Dutch War ceded all of Suriname to the Dutch.

== Resorts ==
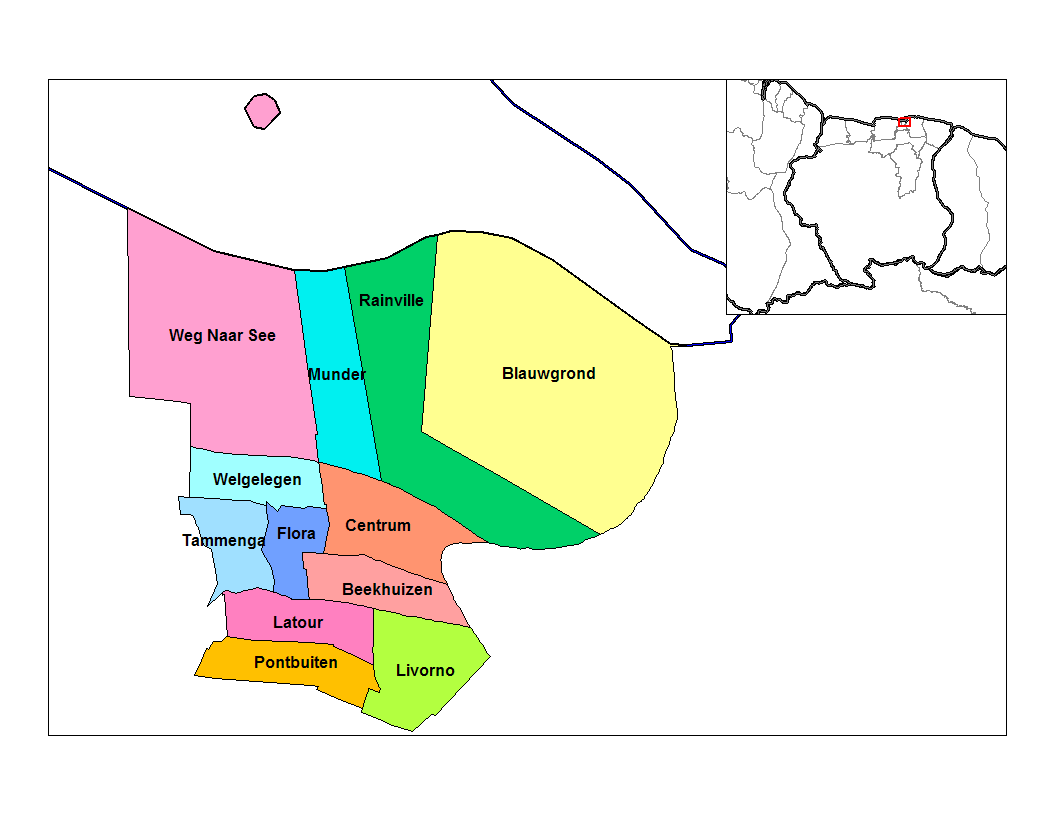
Resorts of Paramaribo

Paramaribo is divided into 12 resorts (ressorten):

- Beekhuizen
- Blauwgrond
- Centrum
- Flora
- Latour
- Livorno
- Munder
- Pontbuiten
- Rainville
- Tammenga
- Weg Naar Zee
- Welgelegen

Paramaribo's resorts are akin to boroughs or neighbourhoods; in the rest of Suriname, resorts are equivalent to municipalities.

== Gallery ==
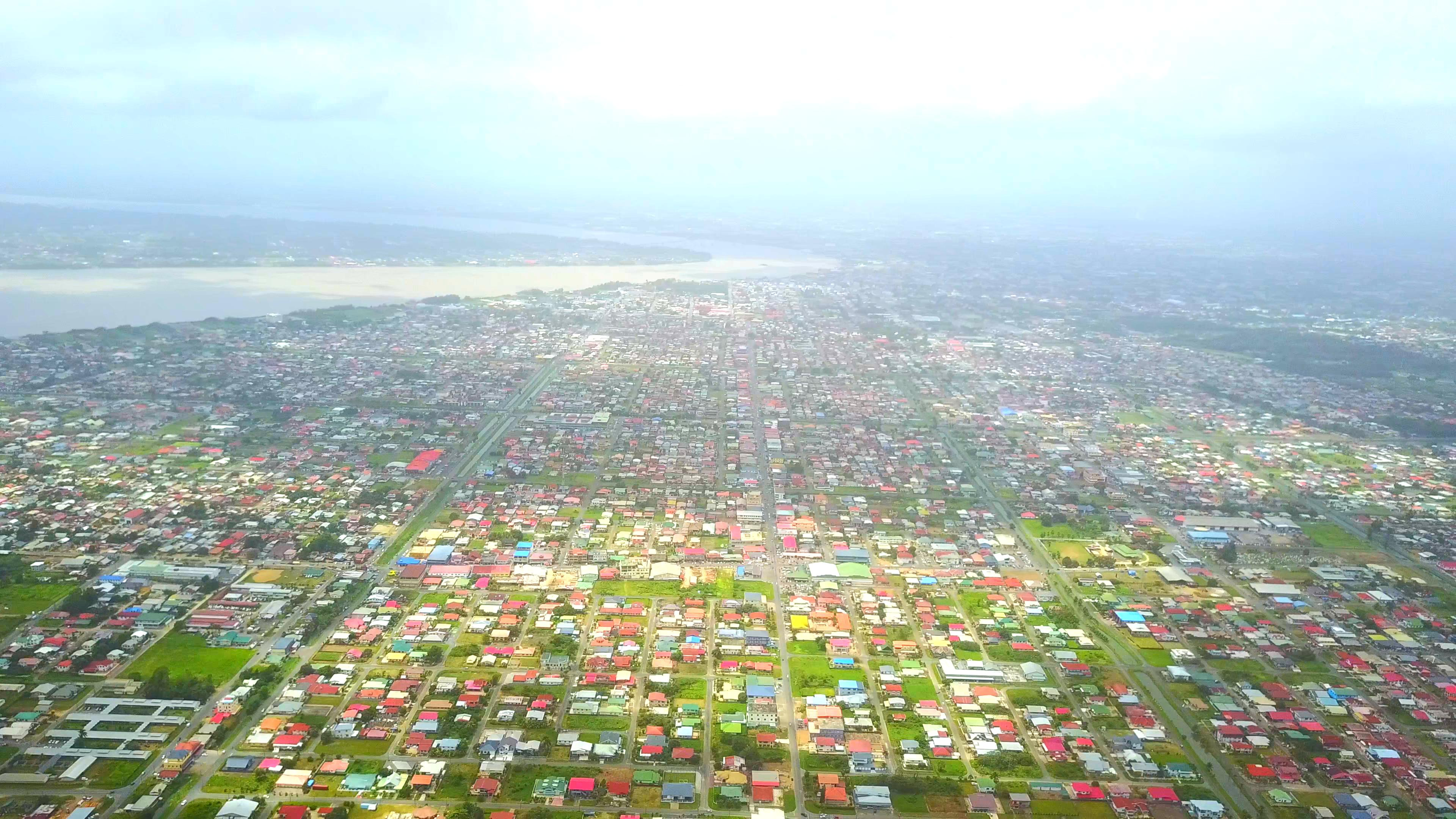

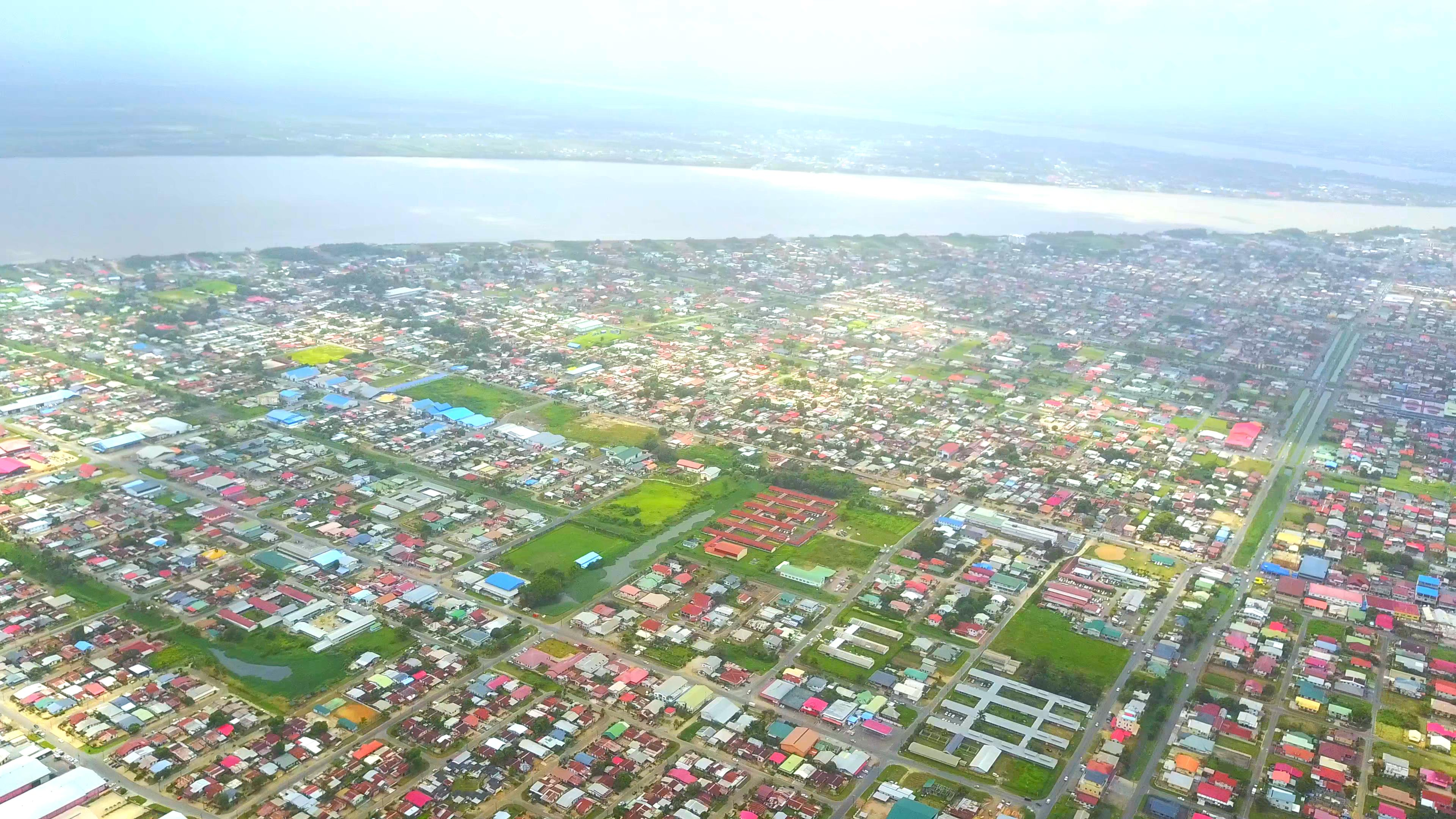

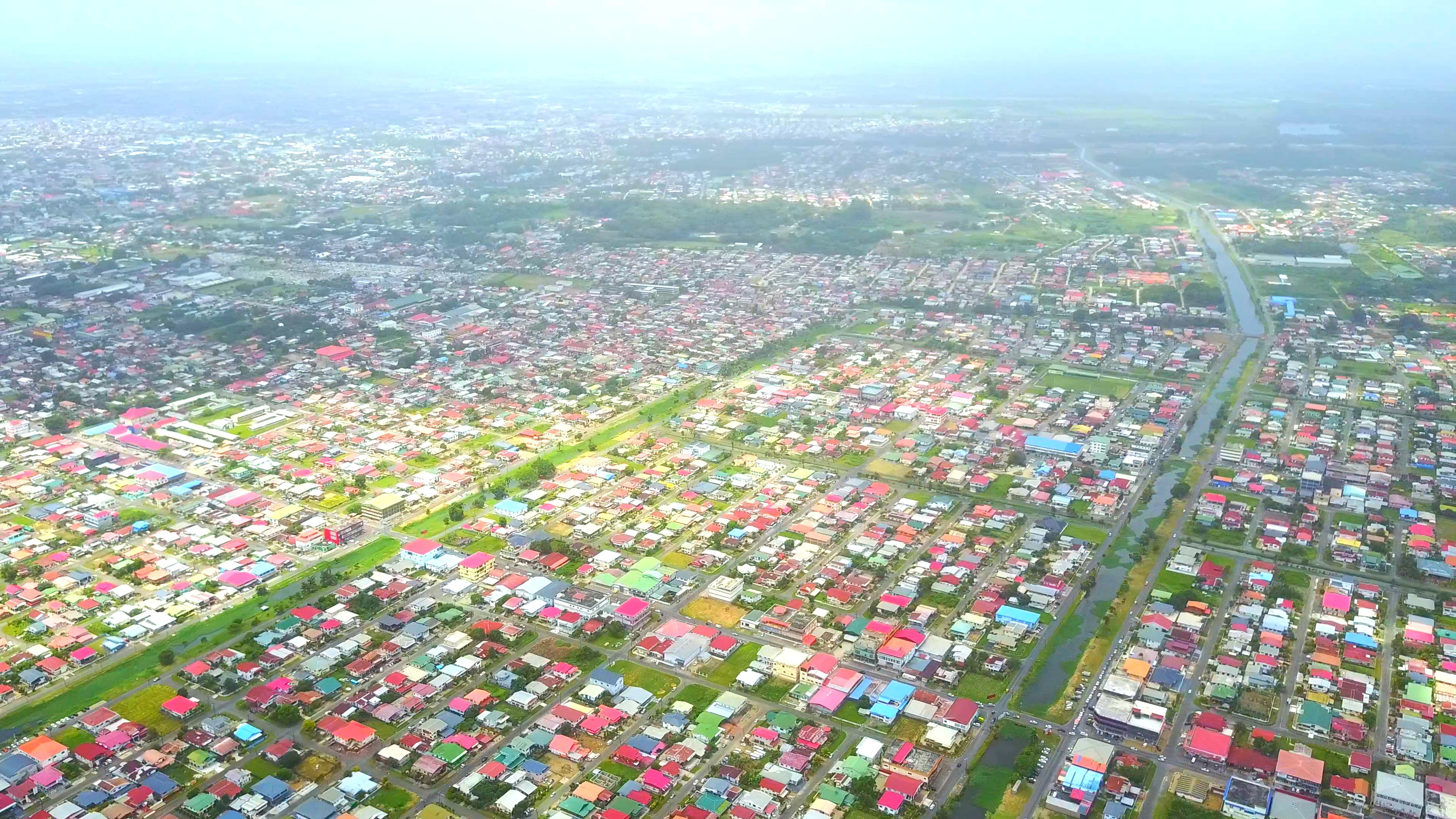

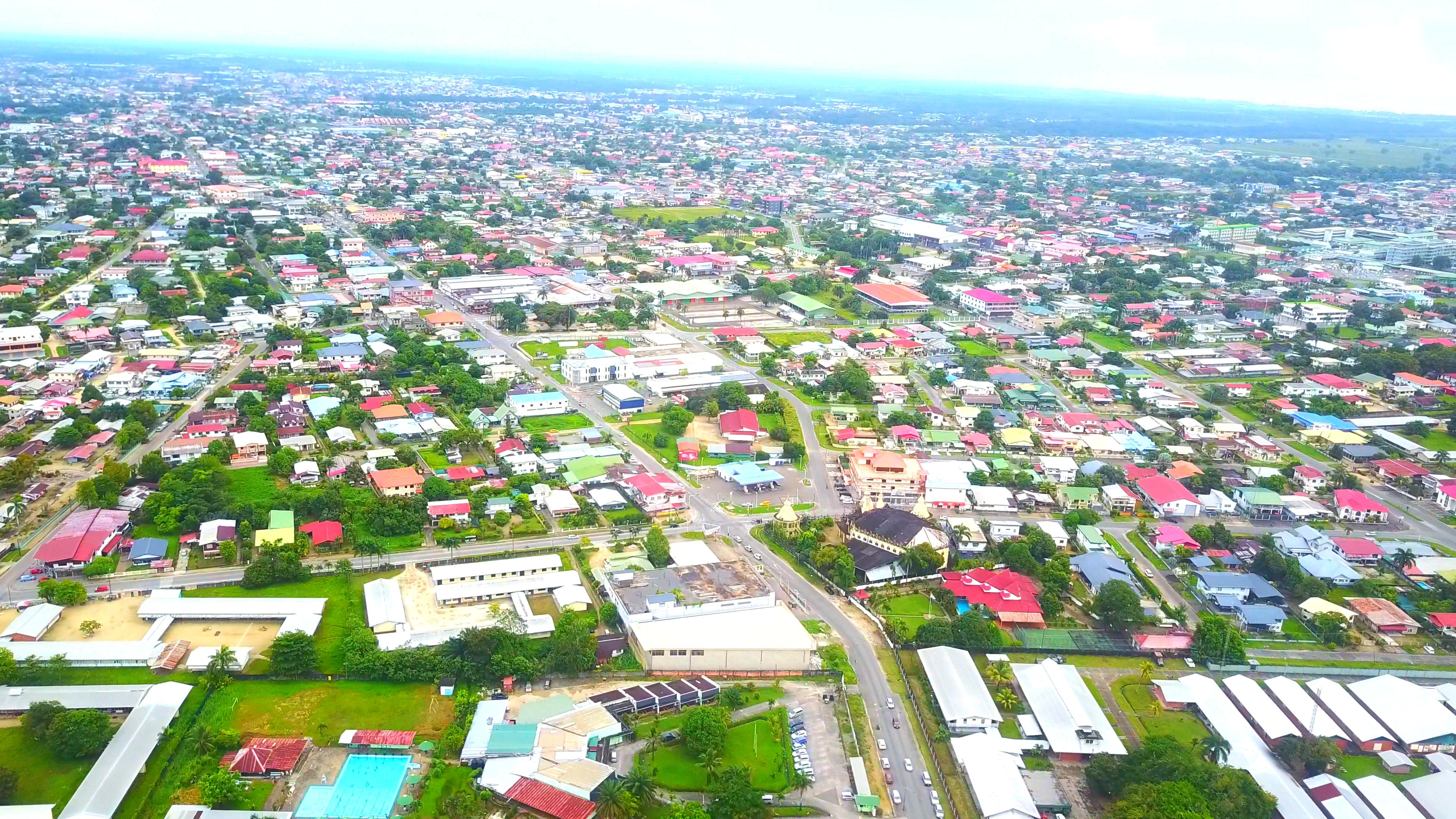

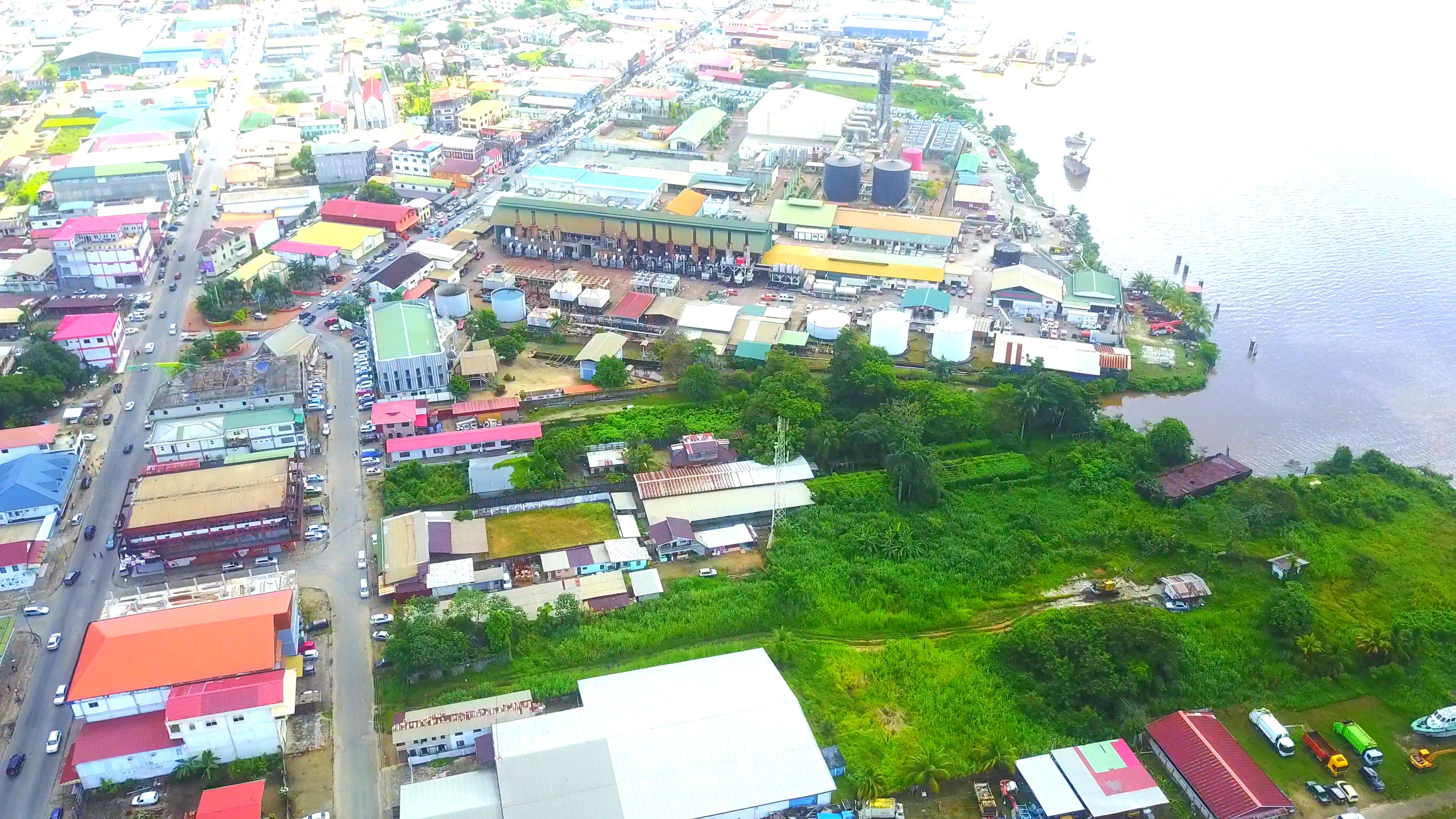

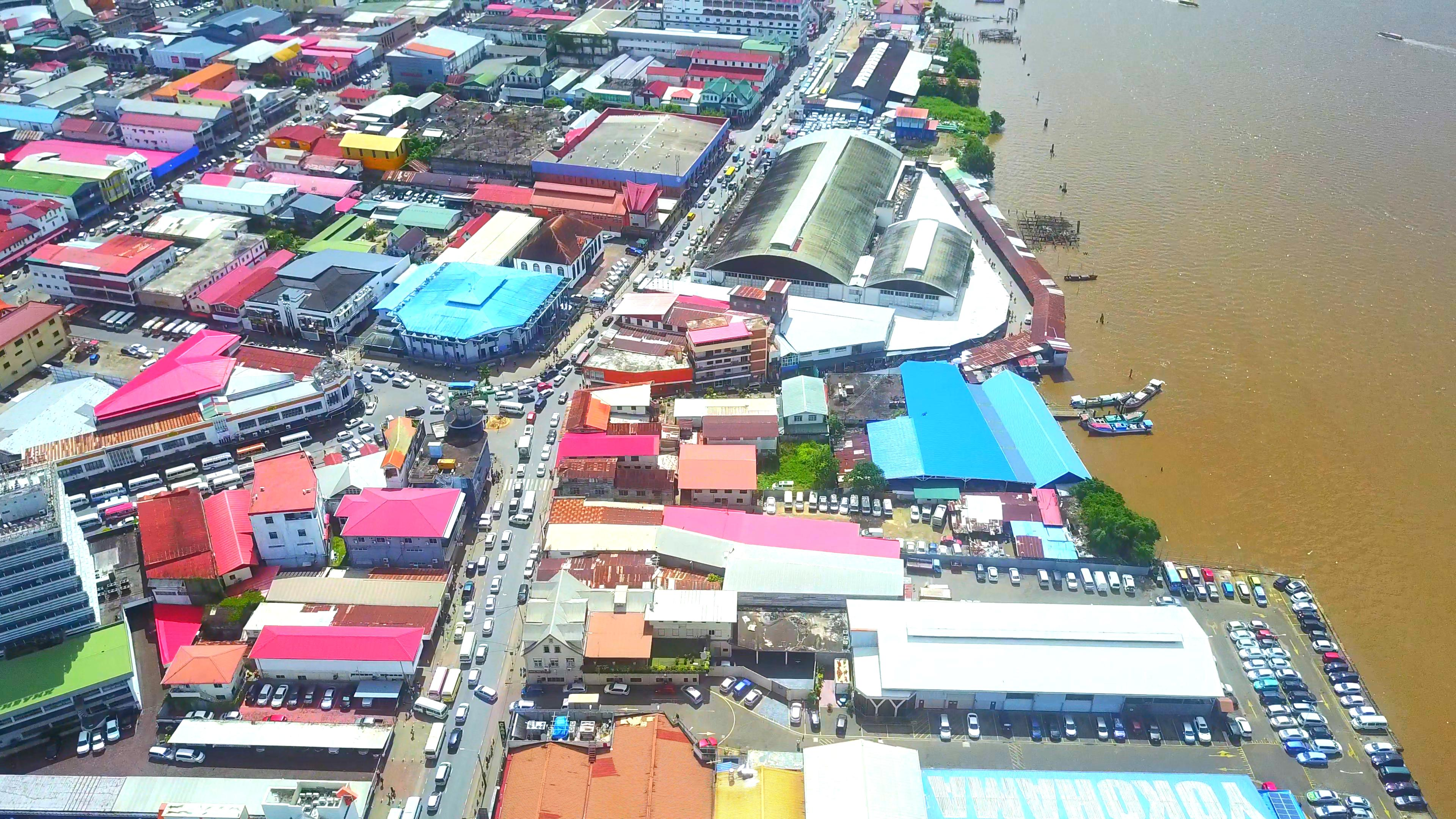

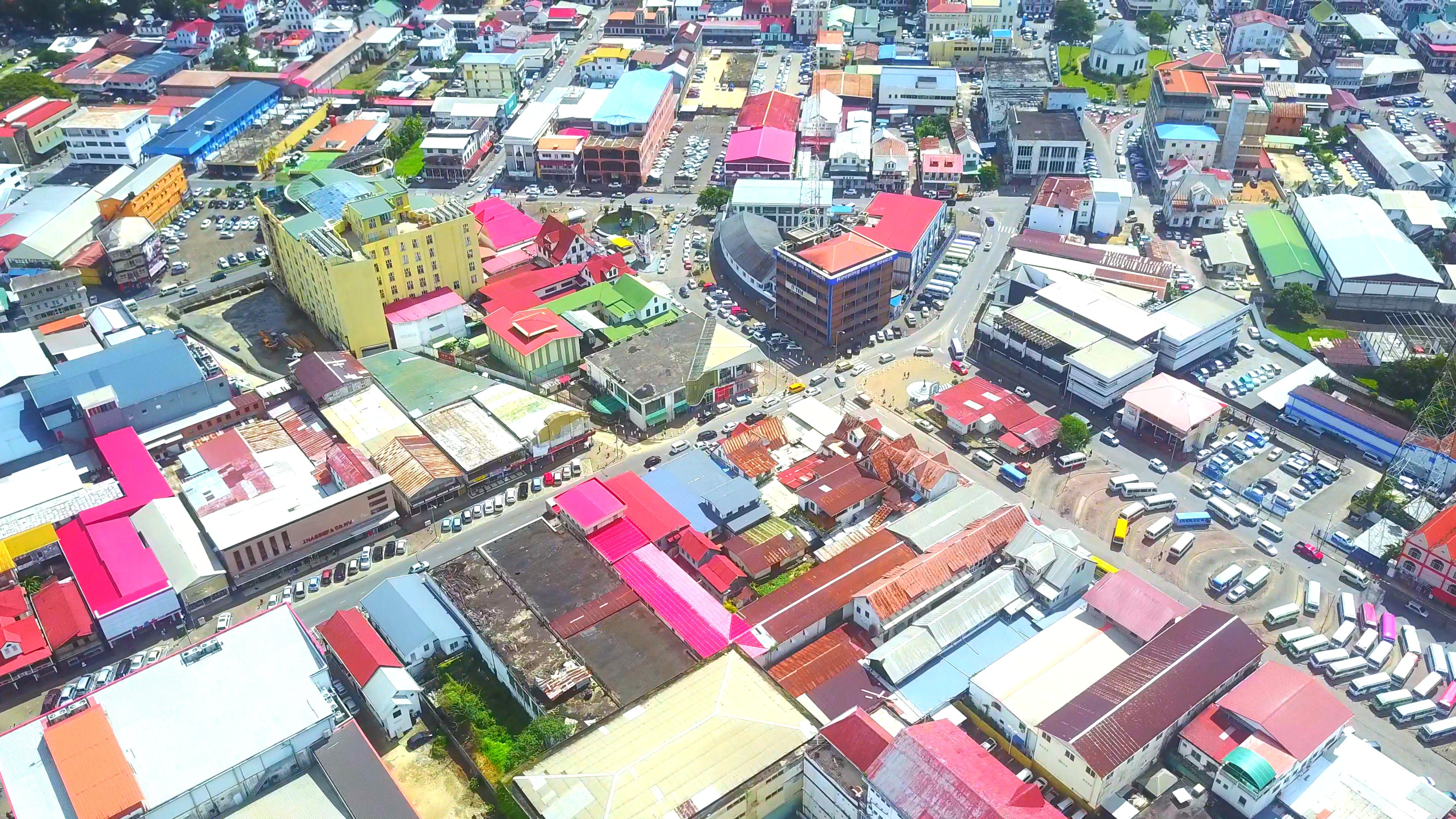

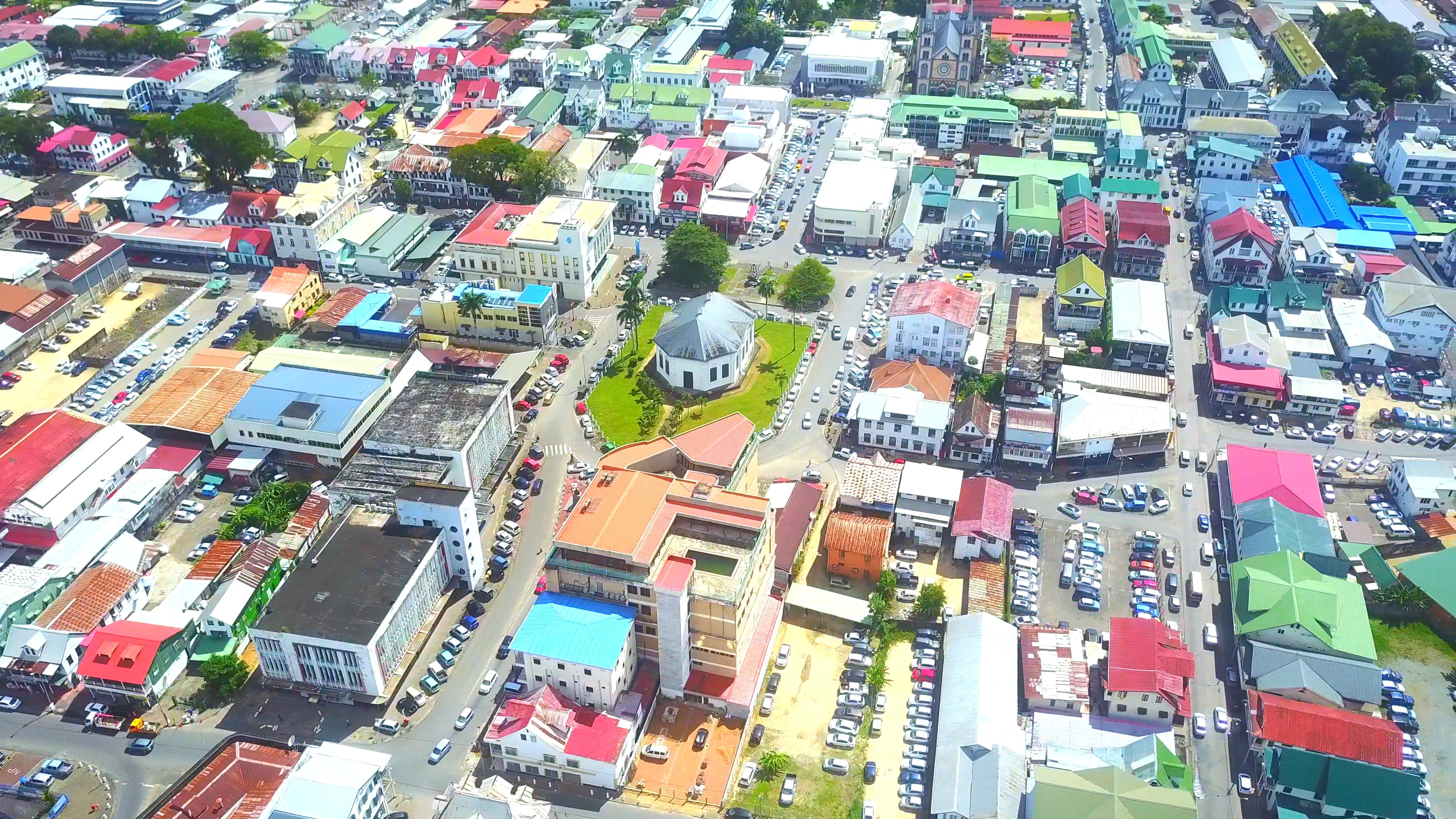

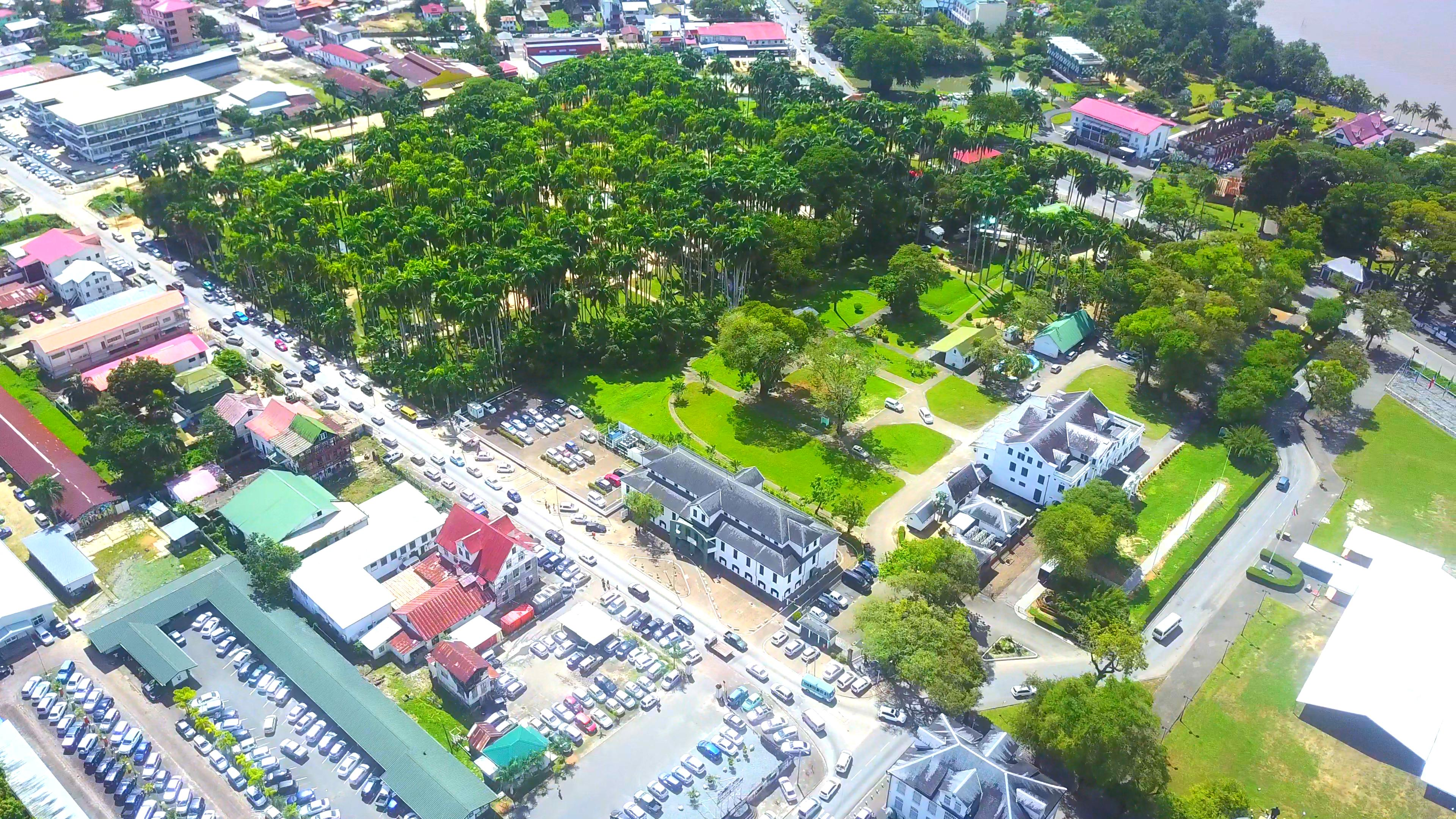

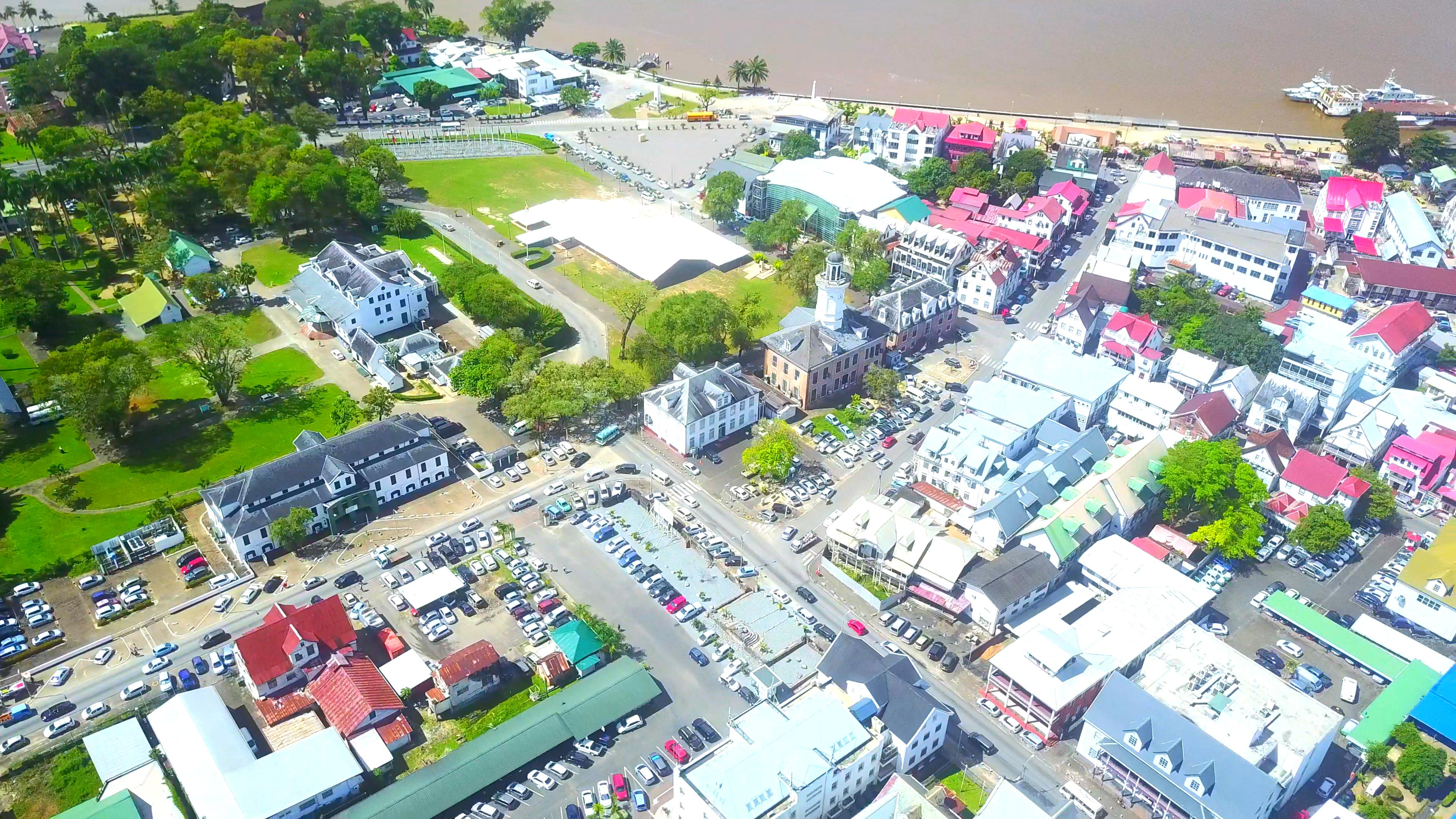

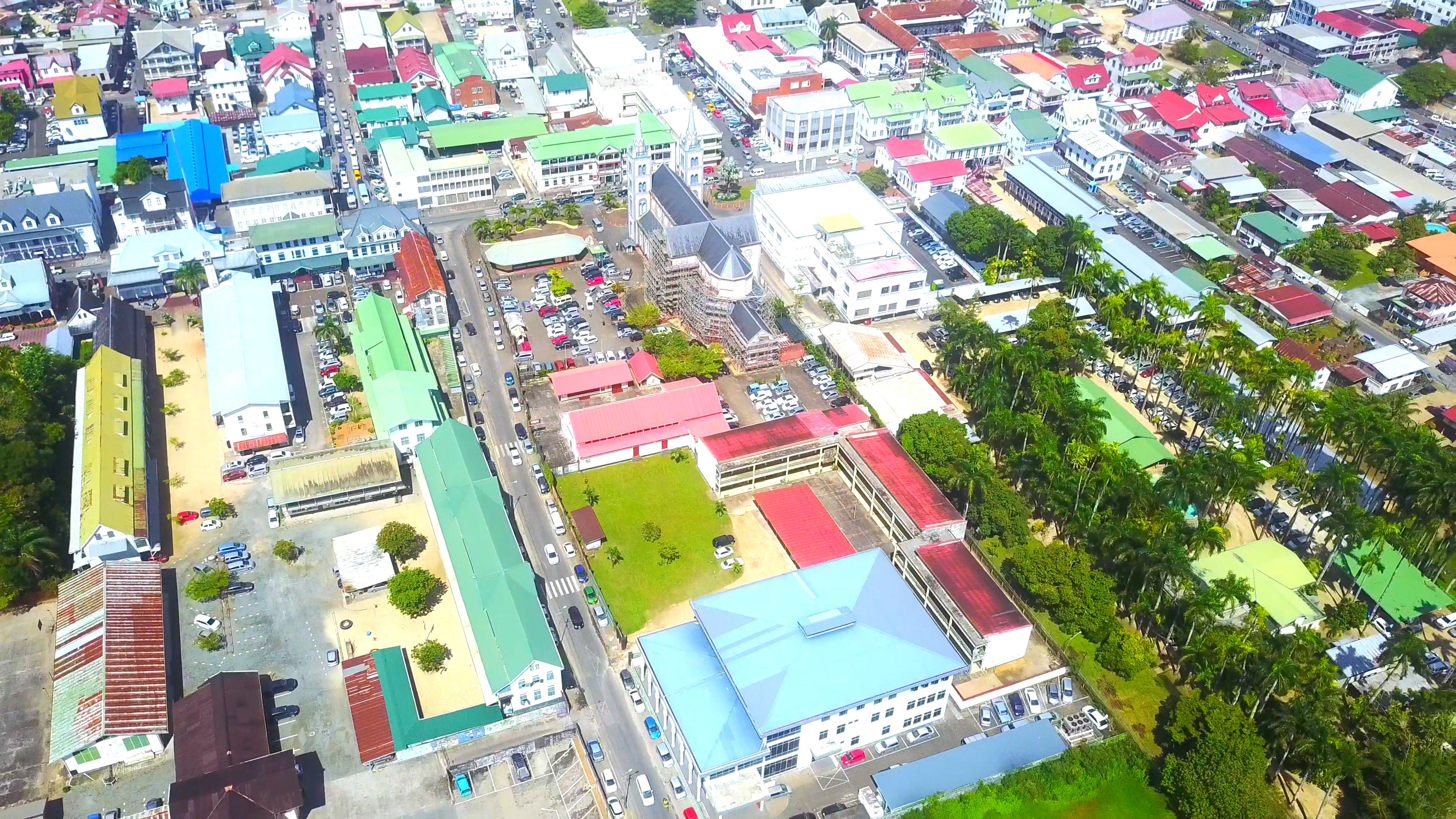

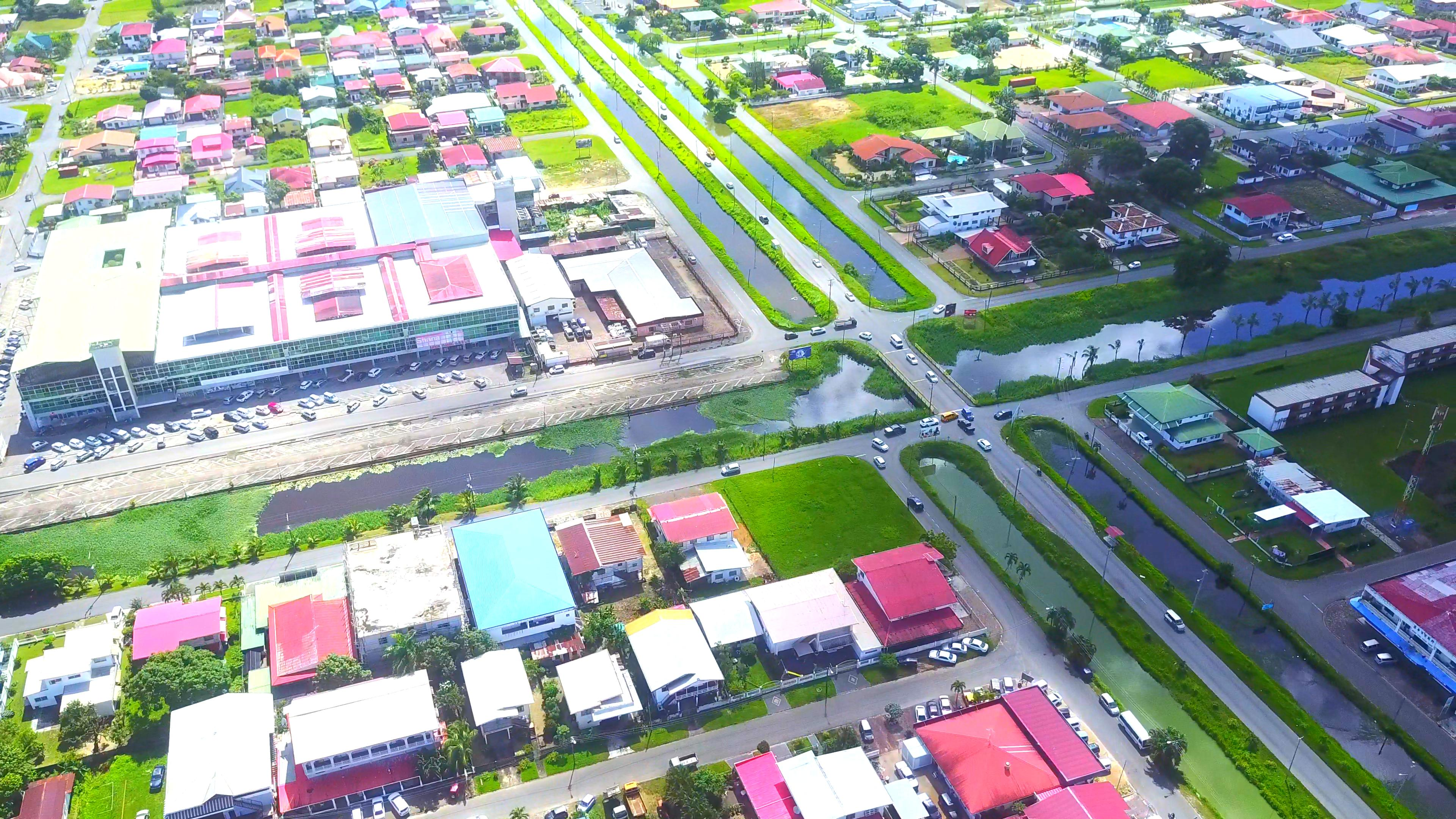

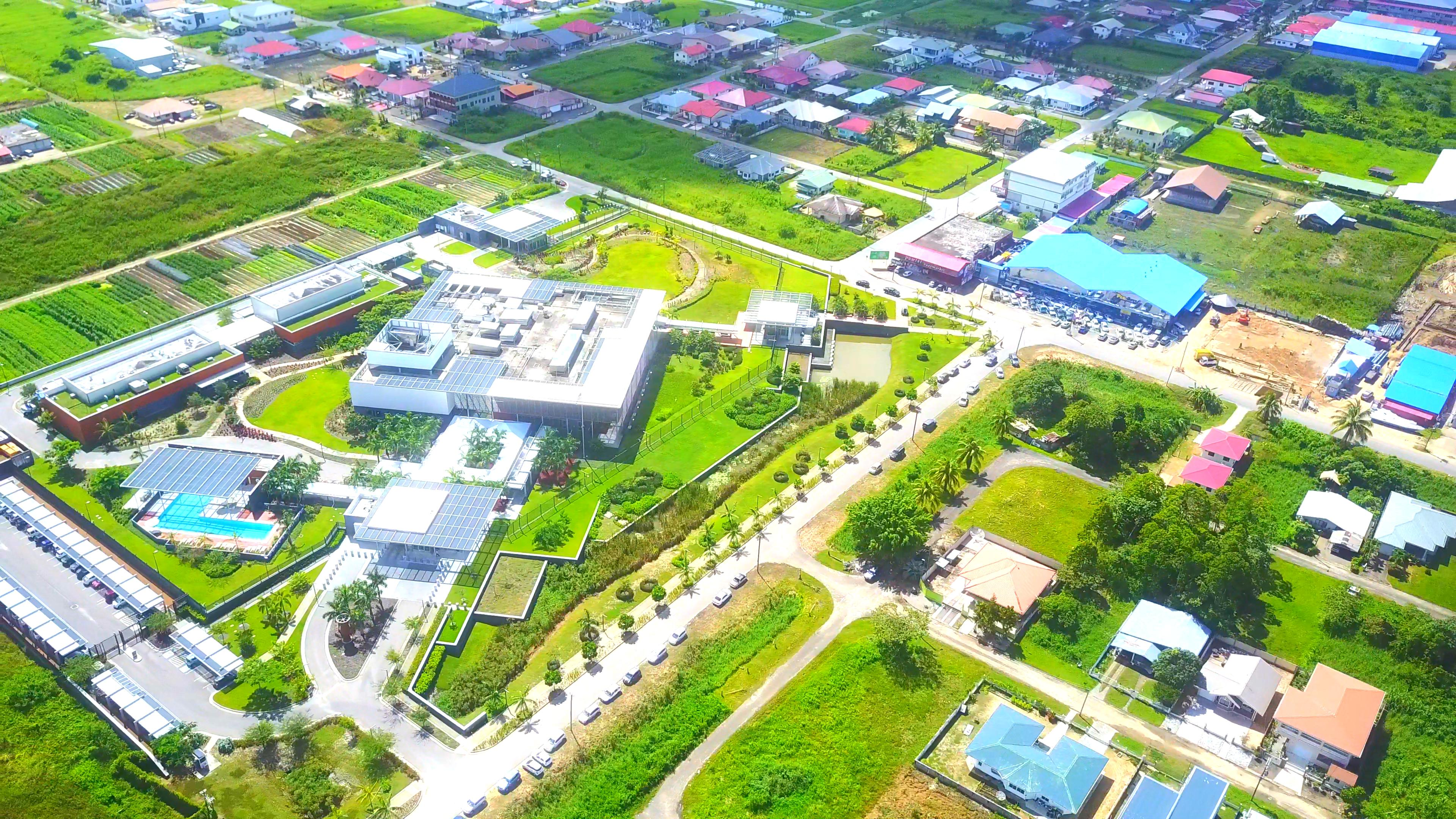

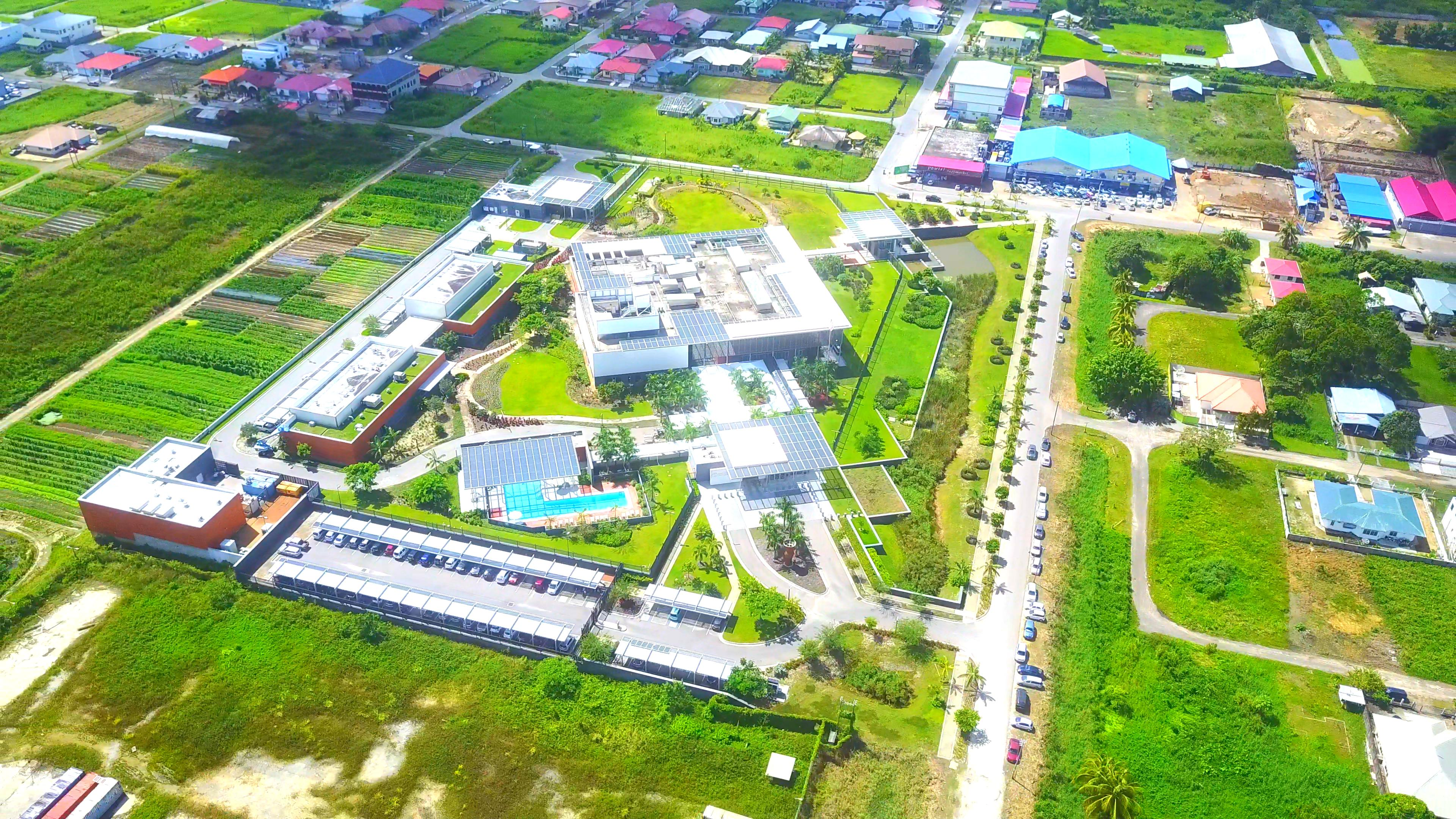

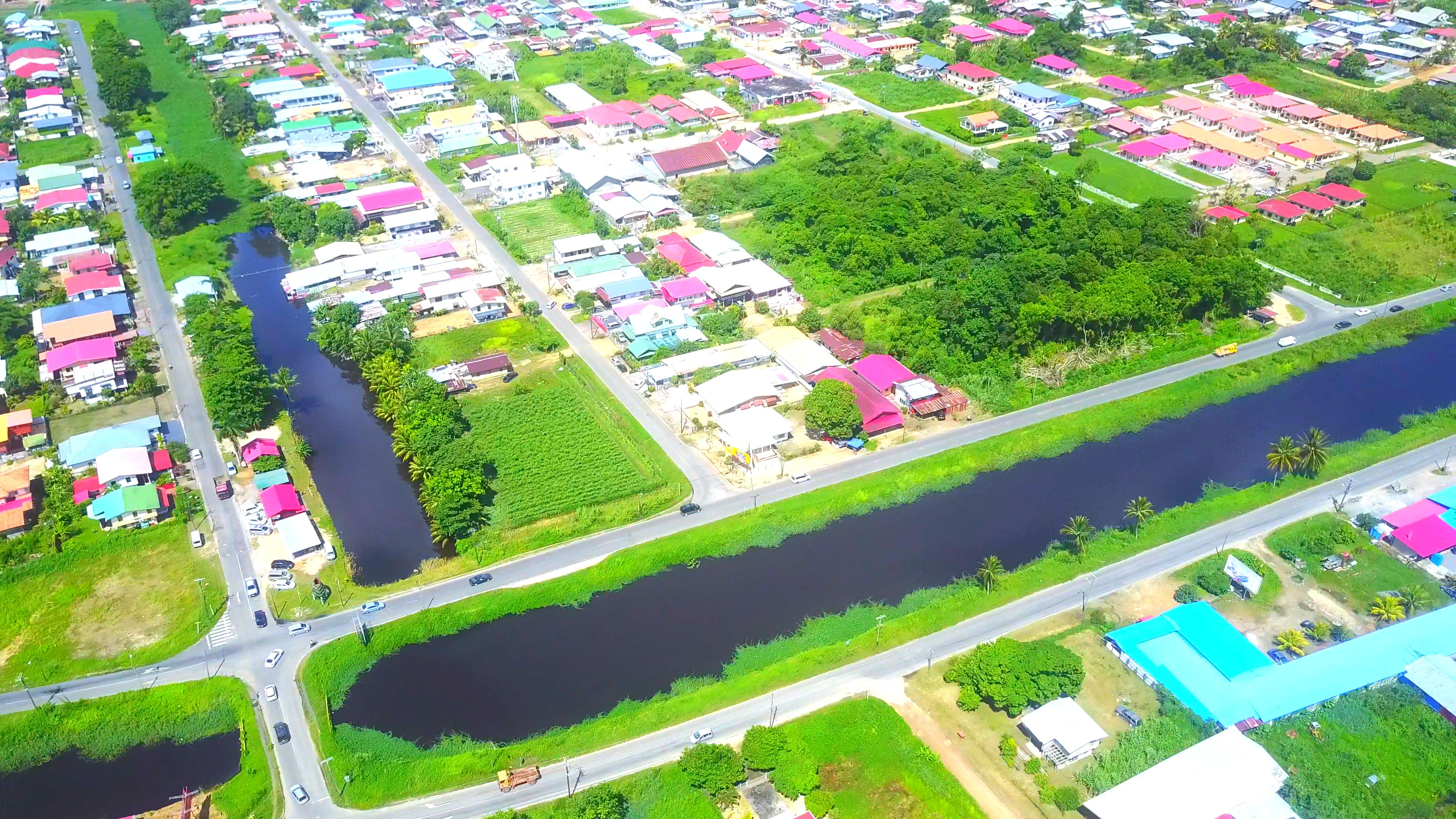

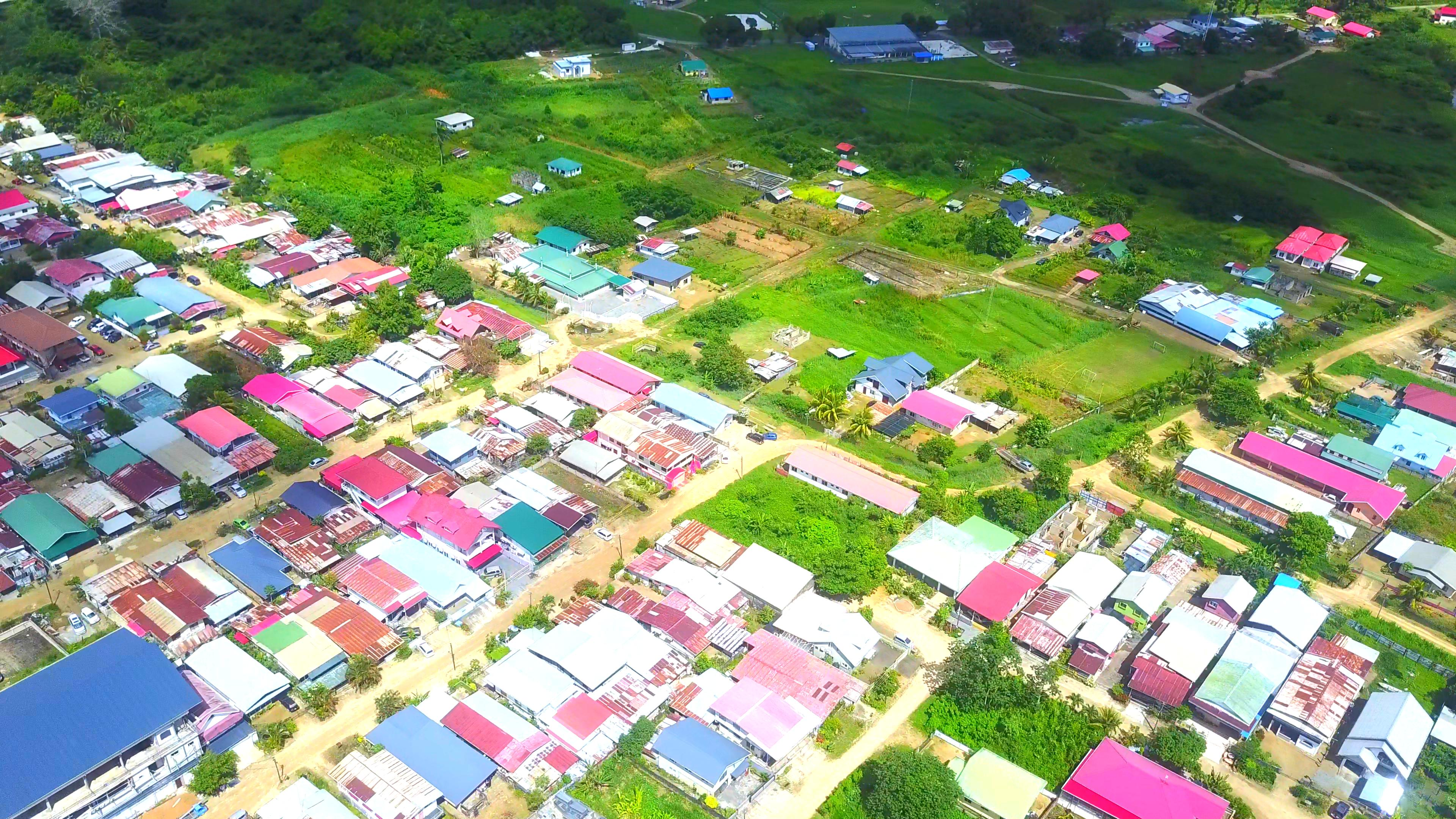

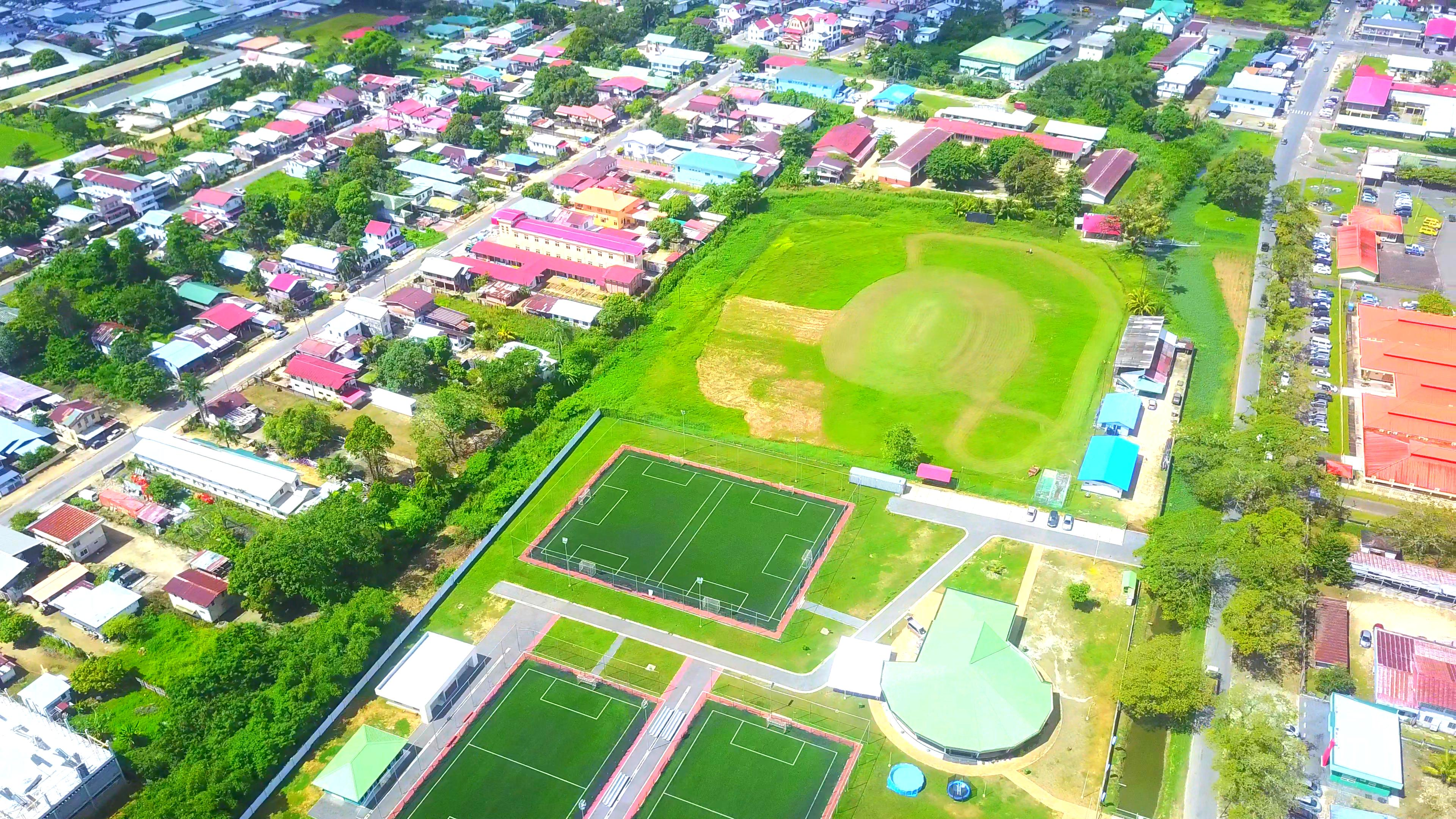

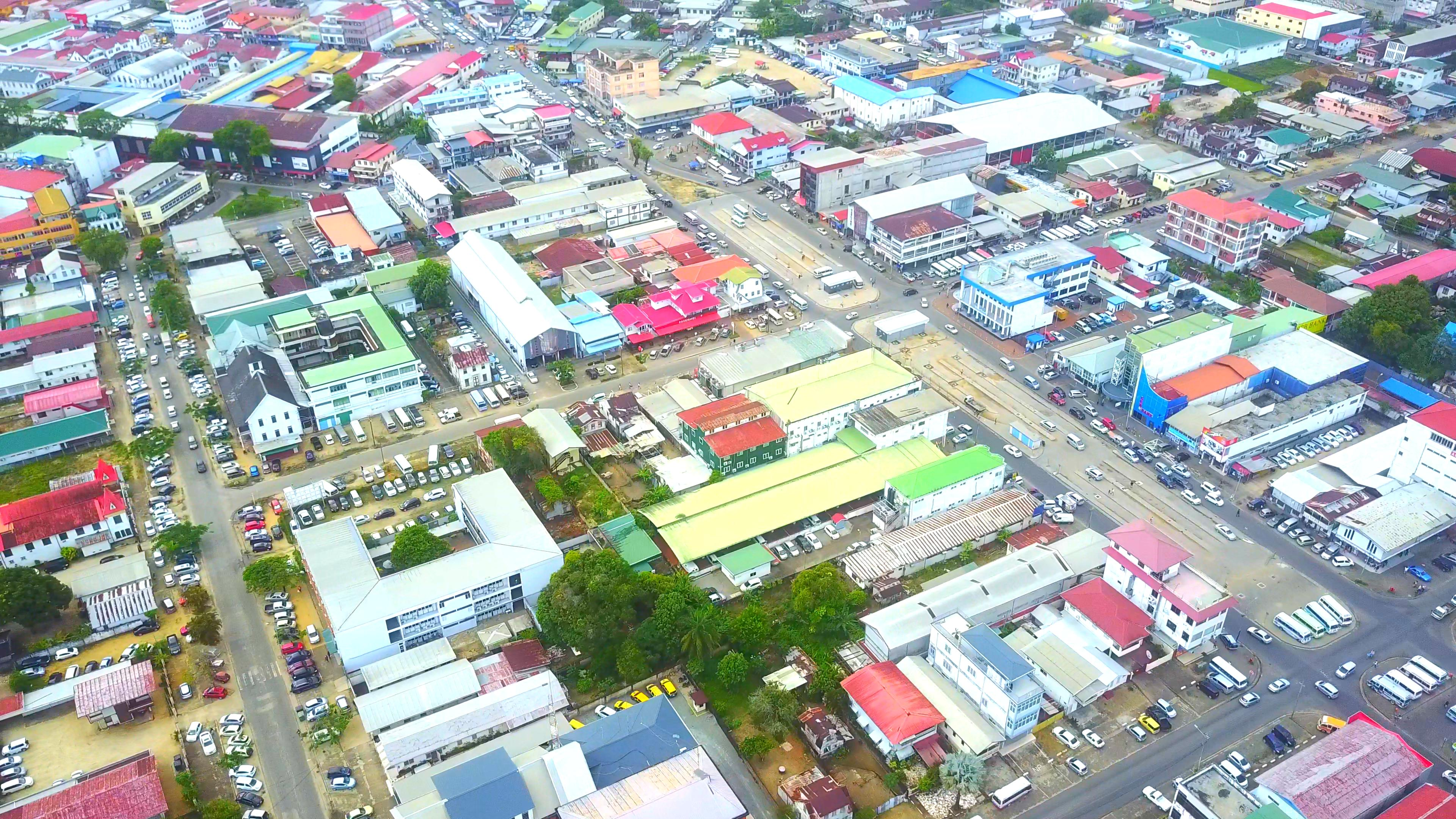

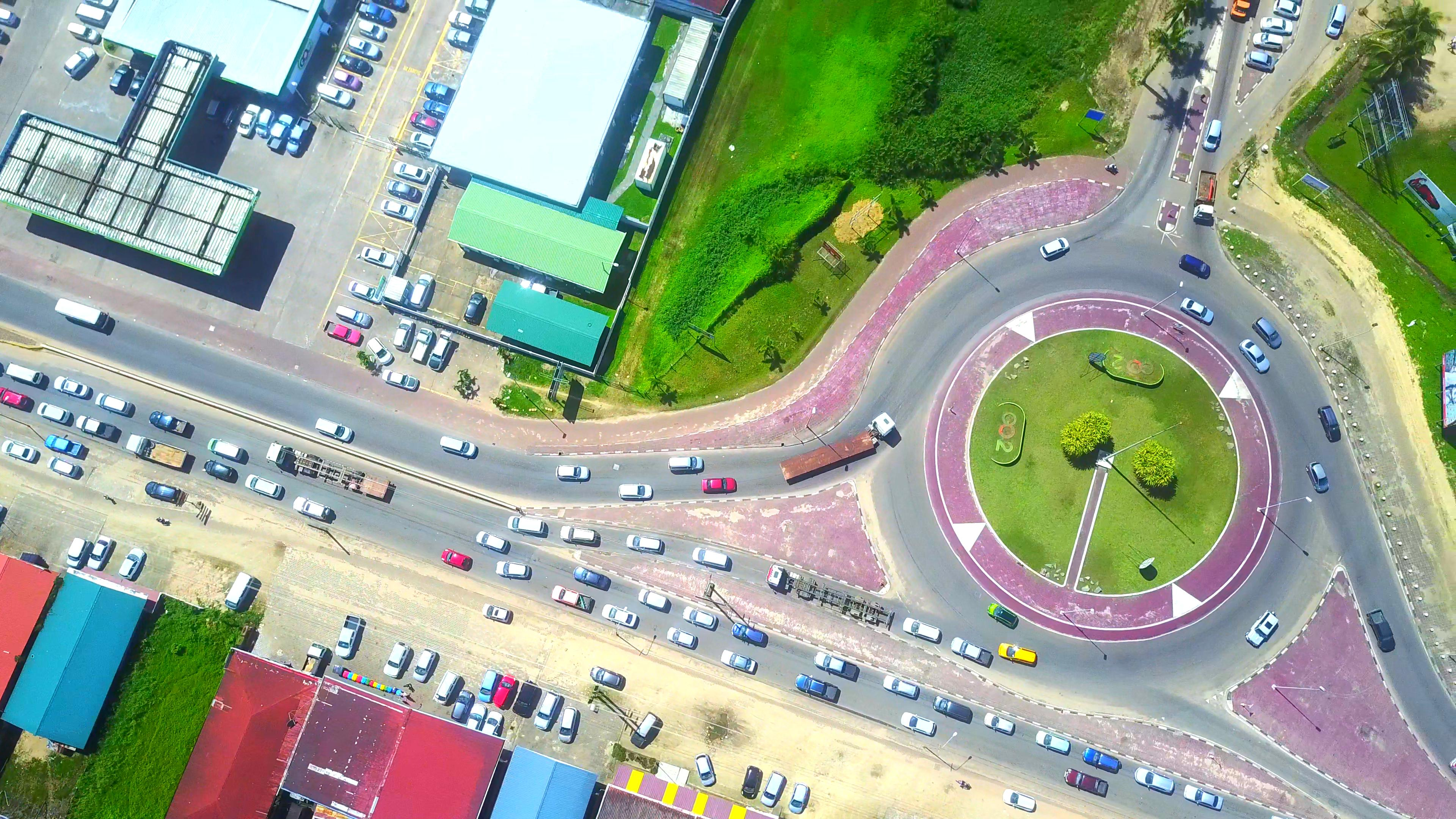

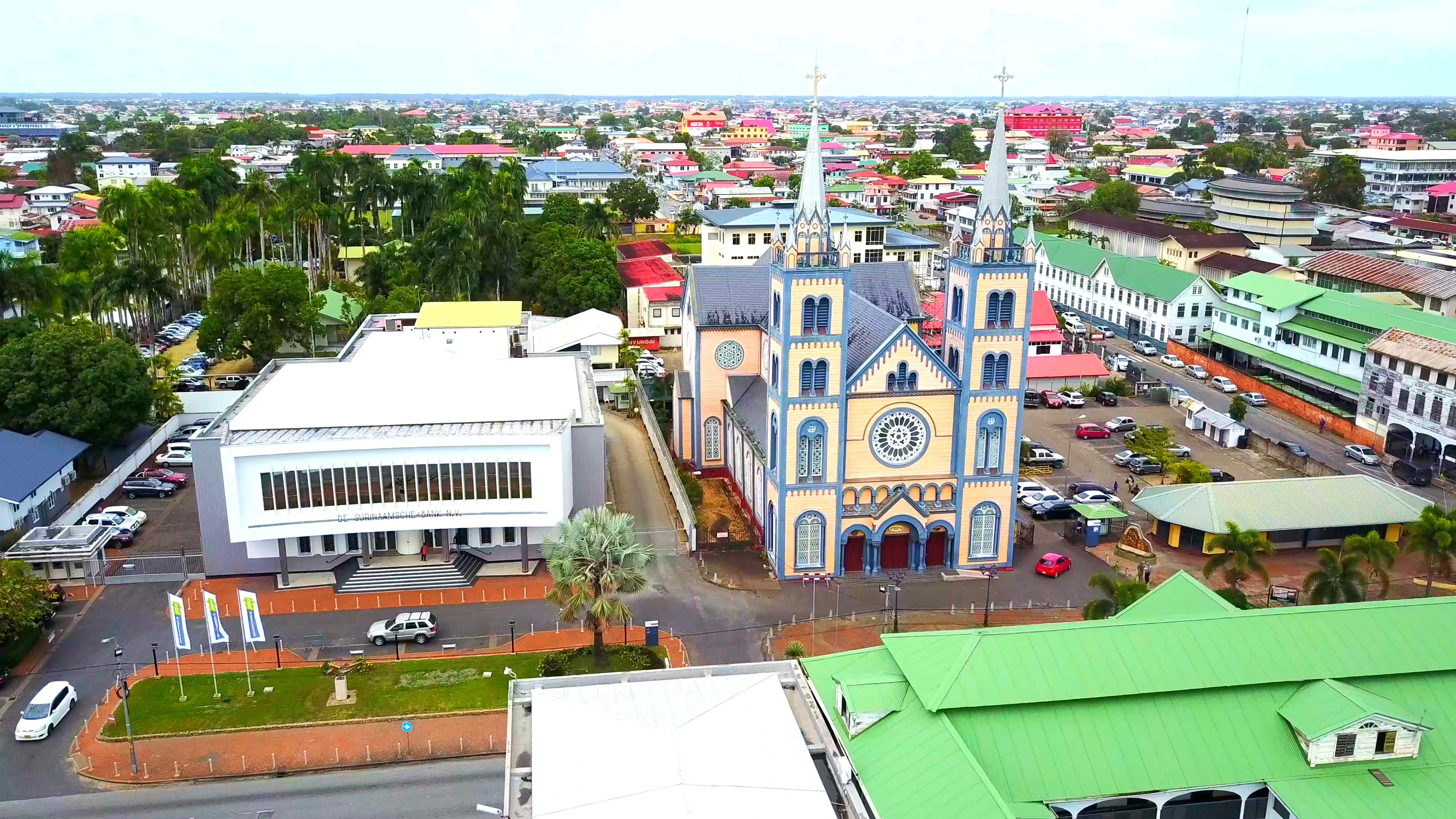
