= Latour, Suriname =

Coordinates: 5°47′48″N 55°12′23″W

Latour
- Resort
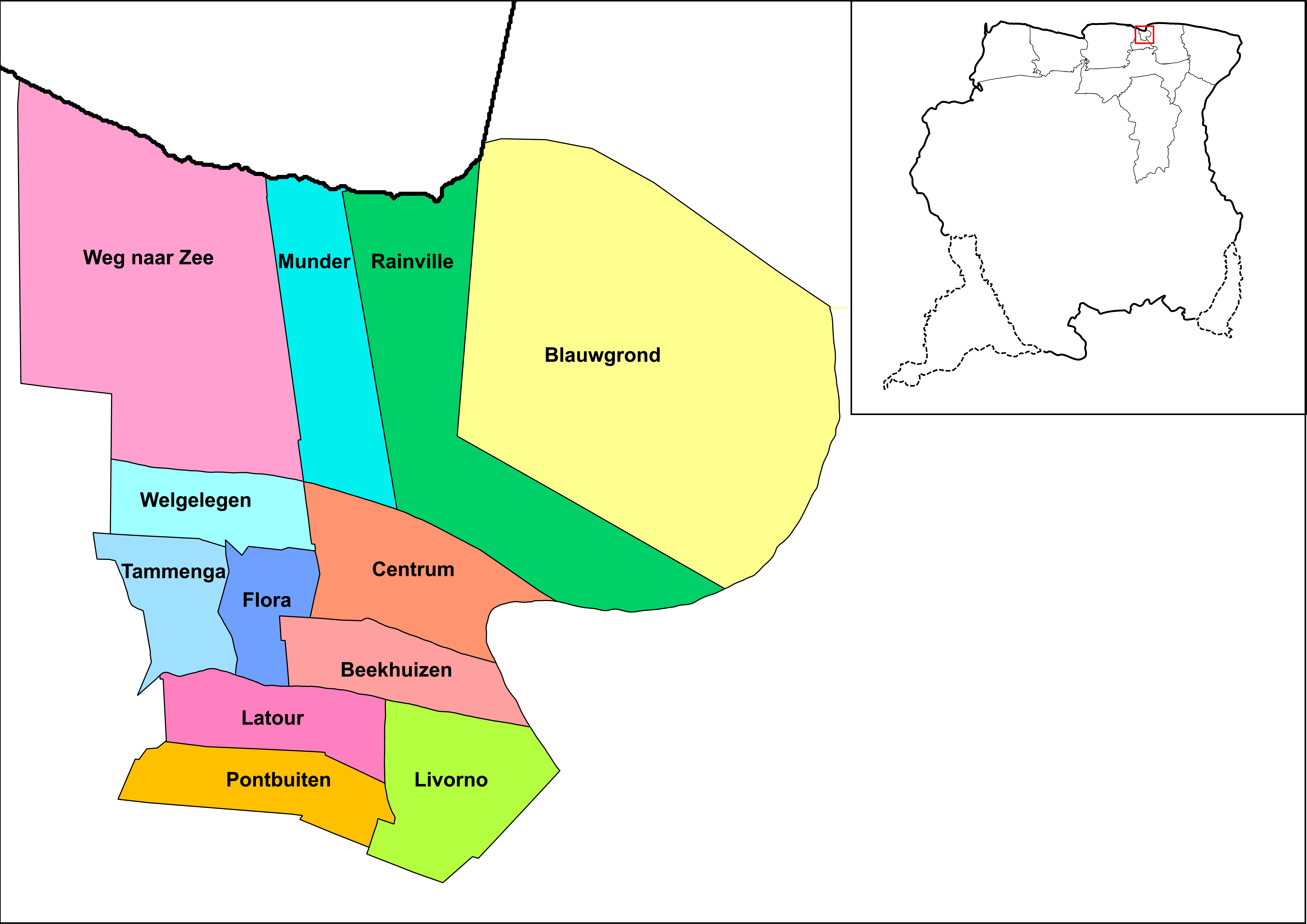
- Map showing the resorts of Paramaribo District. Latour
- Country: Suriname
- District: Paramaribo District

Area
  - Total: 6 km^{2} (2.3 sq mi)

Population (2012)
  - Total: 29,526
  - Density: 4,900/km^{2} (13,000/sq mi)
- Time zone: UTC-3 (AST)

Latour is a resort in Suriname, located in the Paramaribo District. Its population at the 2012 census was 29,526. Latour is a low income neighbourhood with large unemployment. Latour is the most populous resort of Paramaribo.

One of the most active NGOs in Latour is Stibula, which works to provide development to the area's youth.
