= Van Stockumberg =

Mountain in Suriname

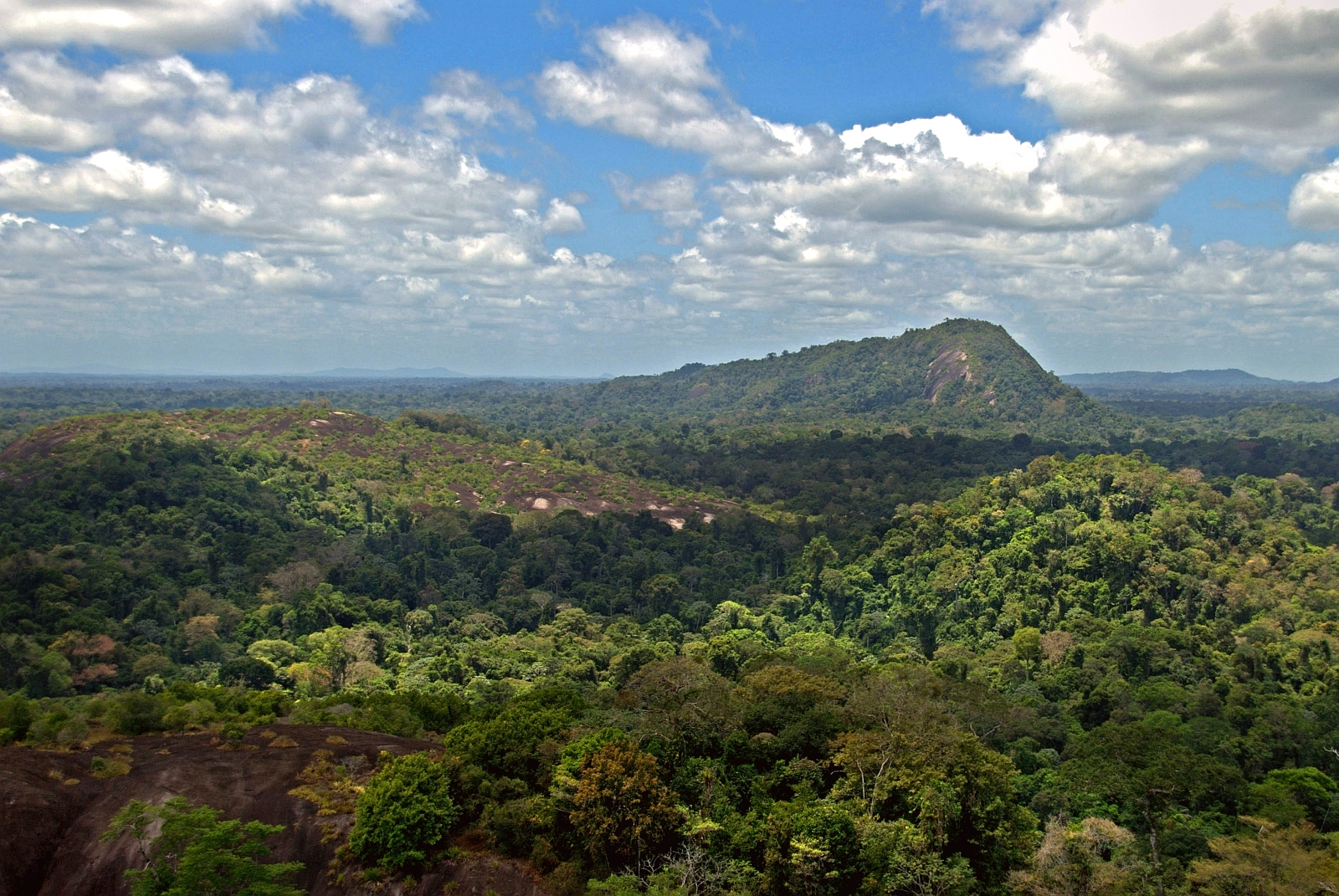
- The Van Stockumberg seen from the Voltzberg

Highest point
- Elevation: 355 m (1,165 ft)
- Coordinates: 4°40′38″N 56°8′3″W

Geography
- Location within Suriname
- Location: Sipaliwini District, Suriname
- Parent range: Emma Range

Van Stockumberg is a mountain in Suriname at 355 metres (1,165 ft). It is part of the Emma Range and is located in the Sipaliwini District. It is named after the Dutch explorer A. J. van Stockum. It is next to the Voltzberg, however the Van Stockumberg is much more difficult to climb.
