= Ietje Paalman-de Miranda =

Dutch mathematician and professor (1936–2020)

- Born: Aïda Beatrijs de Miranda; 20 February 1936; Uitvlugt, Paramaribo, Suriname
- Died: 11 May 2020 (aged 84); Amsterdam, Netherlands
- Occupations: Mathematician; professor
- Known for: first female full professor of mathematics in Amsterdam

Aïda Beatrijs “Ietje” Paalman-de Miranda (20 February 1936 – 11 May 2020) was a Surinamese-born Dutch mathematician and full professor.

She was born in Uitvlugt, Paramaribo. When she was 17 years old she moved from Suriname to the Netherlands to study mathematics at the University of Amsterdam. In that era, it was very unusual to study mathematics and she was the only woman at the faculty. She graduated cum laude on 23 November 1960. She started a PhD with Johannes de Groot as her supervisor. She defended her PhD thesis "Topological Semigroups" and obtained her degree in 1960, also cum laude. In 1980 she became a full professor in pure mathematics, becoming the first female full professor of mathematics in Amsterdam.

== Research ==
Paalman's research was foremost in topology and set theory. She was the PhD advisor of three students, co-advised by Jan van Mill. She published a book (Topological semigroups - Mathematical Centre Tracts, 1964, Mathematisch Centrum, Amsterdam) and 11 research papers about W-groups, topological representations of semi-groups and about compact groups. Paalman was also the author of numerous lecture notes for the courses she taught at the Korteweg-de Vries Institute for Mathematics at the University of Amsterdam.

== Personal ==
She married Dolf Paalman (chief pharmacist). They had two children and three grand children.
