= Munder, Suriname =

Coordinates: 5°52′20″N 55°10′34″W

Munder
- Resort
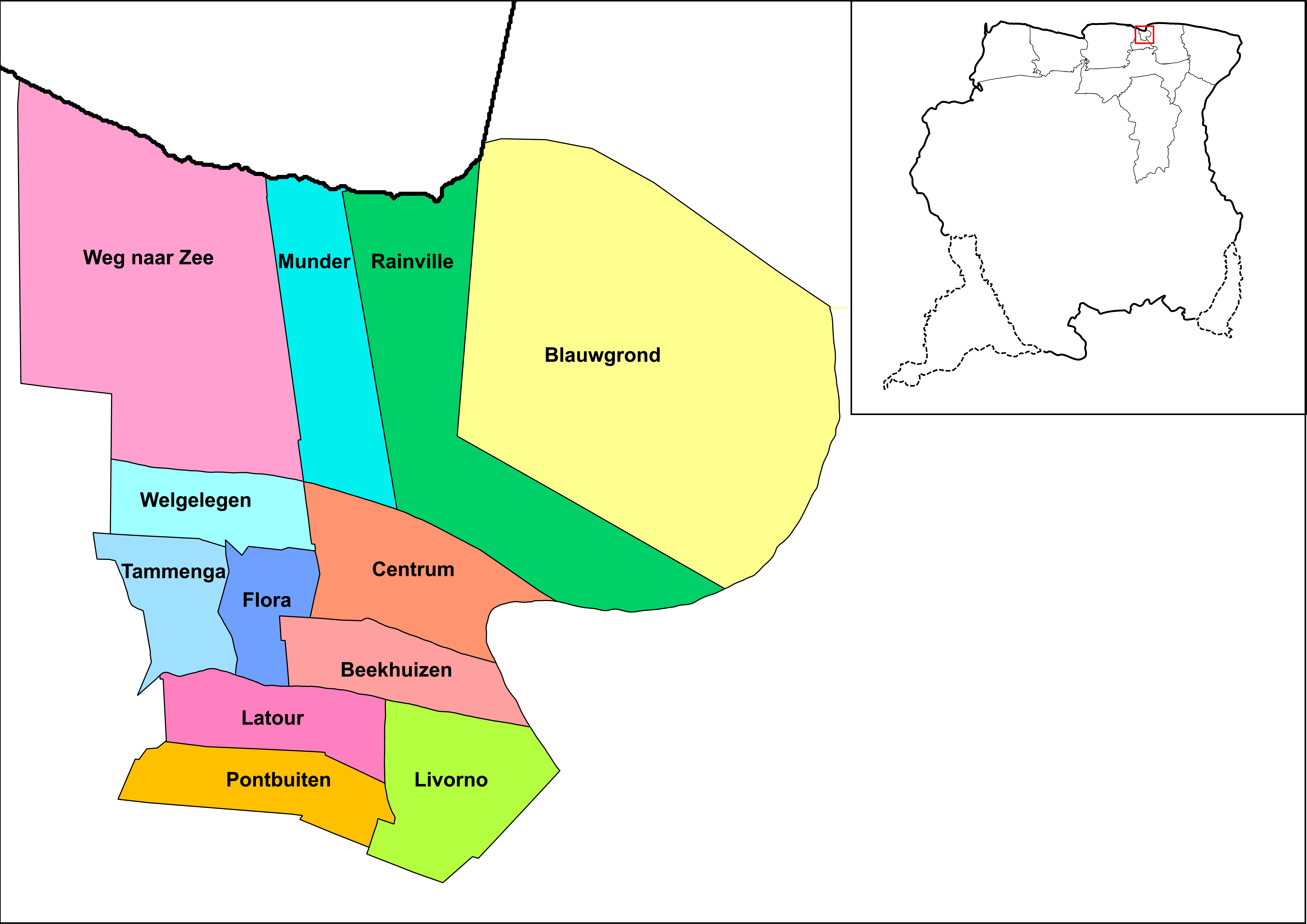
- Map showing the resorts of Paramaribo District. Munder
- Country: Suriname
- District: Paramaribo District

Area
  - Total: 14 km^{2} (5.4 sq mi)

Population (2012)
  - Total: 17,234
  - Density: 1,200/km^{2} (3,200/sq mi)
- Time zone: UTC-3 (AST)

Munder (also Munderbuiten) is a resort in Suriname, in the Paramaribo District. Its population at the 2012 census was 17,234.
