= Munder, Udupi =

Munder Mundkur
- Village
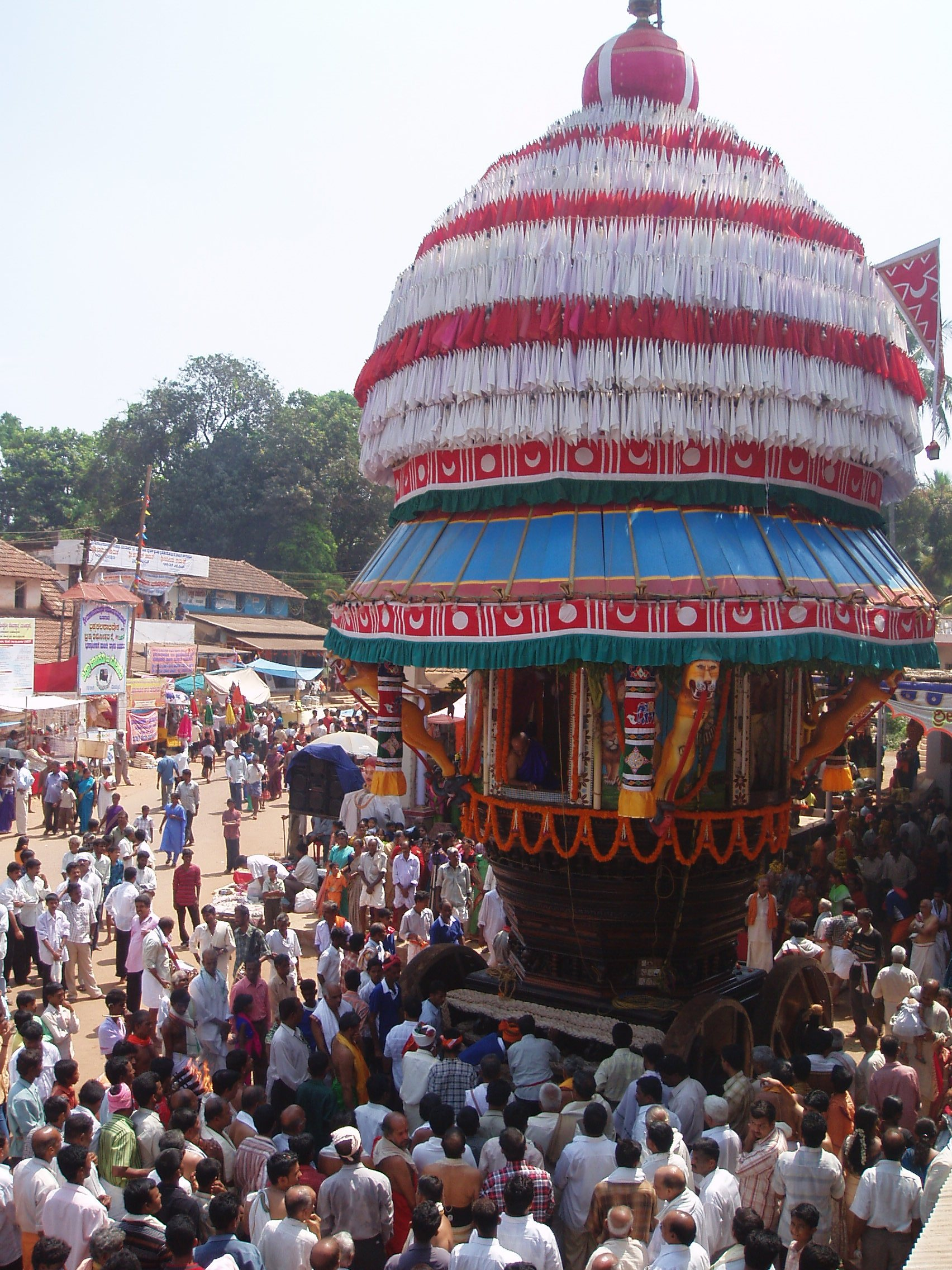
- Annual car festival in Munder
- Interactive map of Munder
- Coordinates: 13.128722°N 74.866111°E
- Country: India
- State: Karnataka
- Region: Tulunad
- District: Udupi
- Talukas: Karla (Karkal)

Government
  - Body: Gram panchayat

Area
  - Total: 14.06 km^{2} (5.43 sq mi)
- Elevation: 20 m (66 ft)

Population (2011)
  - Total: 5,747
  - Density: 408.7/km^{2} (1,059/sq mi)

Languages
  - Official: Tulu
- Time zone: UTC+5:30 (IST)
- PIN: 576121
- Telephone Code: 91-(0)8258
- ISO 3166 code: IN-KA
- Vehicle registration: KA-20
- Sex ratio: 1.23 ♂/♀
- Website: karnataka.gov.in

Munder is a village in the southern state of Karnataka, India, in the Karkala taluk of Udupi district.

According to the 2011 census Munder had a population of 5,747 with 2,581 males and 3,166 females.
