= Voltzberg =

Mountain in Suriname

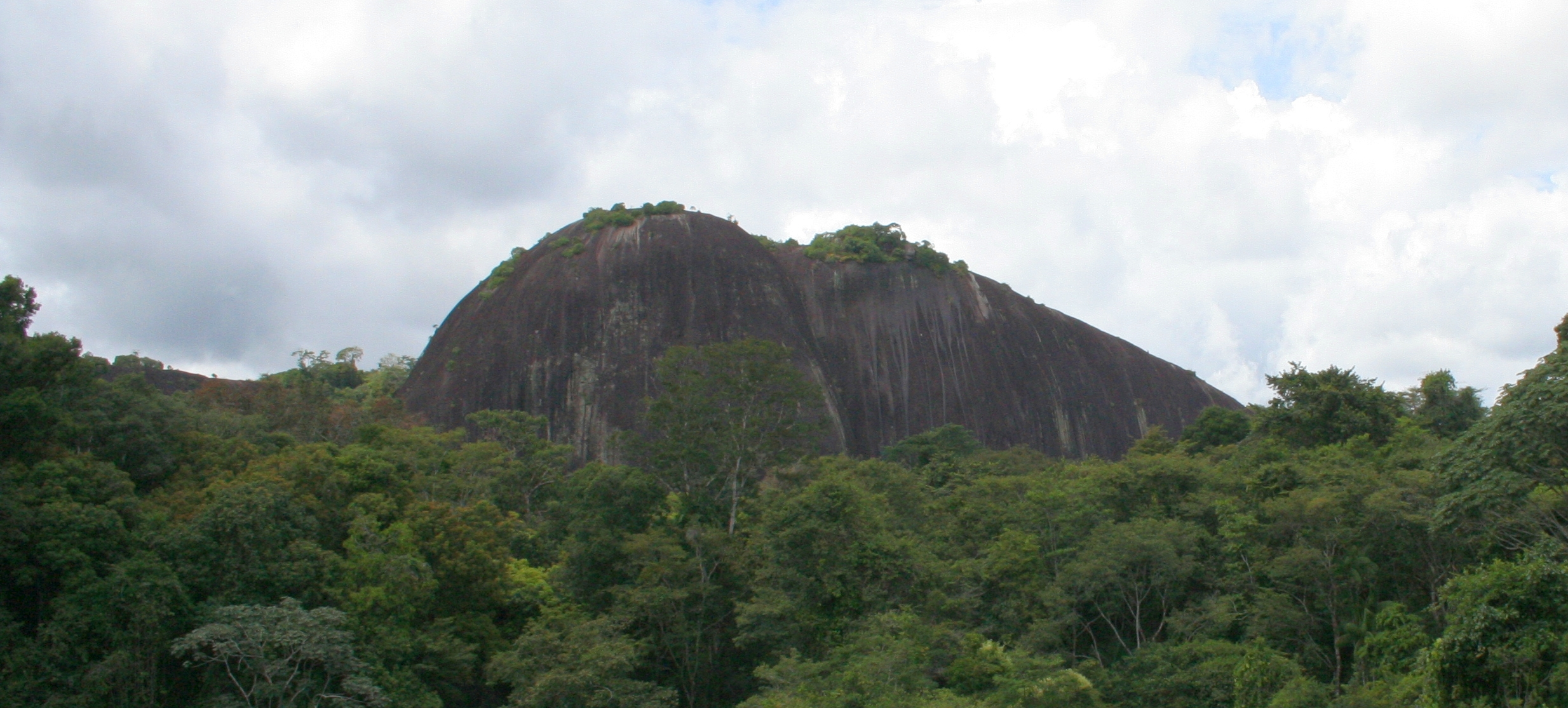

Highest point
- Elevation: 240 m (790 ft)
- Coordinates: 4°40′39″N 56°11′3″W

Geography
- Location within Suriname
- Location: Sipaliwini District, Suriname
- Parent range: Emma Range

Voltzberg is a mountain in Suriname at 240 metres (787 ft). It is part of the Emma Range and is located in the Sipaliwini District. It is named after the German geologist Friedrich Voltz. Voltzberg used to form a nature reserve together with the close by Raleigh Falls. In 1998, it became part of the Central Suriname Nature Reserve.

The mountain, an inselberg, rises from three sides and therefore looks very imposing, however, from its fourth side it is much easier to climb than the neighbouring Van Stockumberg. The mountain is home to many monkeys. The mountain is popular with bird watchers with more than 400 different birds including the Guianan cock-of-the-rock.

The Voltzberg features on the 20 Surinamese dollar banknote.
