= Yang Bin (disambiguation) =

Yang Bin may refer to:

- Yang Bin (楊邠), Later Han chancellor
- Yang Bin (businessman) (楊斌), modern Dutch-Chinese businessman
- Yang Bin (wrestler), modern wrestler
- Yang Bin (footballer), born 1991
