= 2022 San Antonio migrant deaths =

Deaths of 53 people in Texas tractor-trailer

- Inside the trailer where the migrants were found
- Date: June 27, 2022
- Location: San Antonio, Texas, US; 29°19′37″N 98°36′12″W
- Deaths: 53
- Injuries: 12
- Accused: Rigoberto Ramon Miranda-Orozco
- Convicted: Homero Zamorano Jr., Christian "Gordo" Martinez, Juan Francisco D'Luna-Bilbao, Juan Claudio D'Luna-Mendez, Riley Covarrubias-Ponce, Luis Alberto Rivera-Leal, Felipe Orduna-Torres, Armando Gonzales-Ortega
- Charges: Miranda-Orozco: Conspiracy to bring an alien to the United States resulting in death; Aiding and abetting bringing an alien to the United States resulting in death (3 counts); Conspiracy to bring an alien to the United States causing serious bodily injury and placing lives in jeopardy; Aiding and abetting bringing an alien to the United States causing serious bodily injury and placing lives in jeopardy.
- Verdict: Zamorano Jr., Martinez, Covarrubias-Ponce, Rivera-Leal, D'Luna-Bilbao, D'Luna-Mendez; Pleaded guilty Orduna-Torres, Gonzales-Ortega; Guilty
- Convictions: Zamorano Jr., Martinez, Covarrubias-Ponce, Orduna-Torres, Gonzales-Ortega: Conspiracy to transport illegal aliens resulting in death; Conspiracy to transport aliens resulting in serious bodily injury and placing lives in jeopardy; Transportation of illegal aliens resulting in death; Transportation of illegal aliens resulting in serious bodily injury and placing lives in jeopardy.; Rivera-Leal: Conspiracy to transport aliens resulting in serious bodily injury and placing lives in jeopardy; D'Luna-Bilbao, D'Luna-Mendez: Possession of a firearm by an illegal alien
- Sentence: Orduna-Torres Life imprisonment without the possibility of parole and $250,000 fine Gonzales-Ortega; 83 years in prison and $250,000 fine D'Luna-Mendez 28 months in prison and three years of supervised release

On June 27, 2022, 53 migrants were found dead in and around a tractor-trailer near Lackland Air Force Base in San Antonio, Texas, United States. The deaths, caused by heat exposure and asphyxiation, reportedly occurred during an apparent illegal migrant smuggling attempt across the U.S.–Mexico border. It is the deadliest smuggling incident of its kind in United States history.

== Background ==
During 2022, there had been a record number of migrants crossing the U.S.–Mexico border, with authorities being on pace to record more than 2 million arrests. U.S. Customs and Border Protection figures showed that illegal immigration arrests at the border in May rose to the highest levels ever recorded. They made 239,416 arrests along the border in May, a two percent increase from April.

San Antonio is known as a major transit point for migrants moving from Texas to the rest of the United States. Located 150 miles (240 km) from the U.S.–Mexico border, smugglers would transport migrants to the city by means of large vehicles. Earlier in June, the Department of Homeland Security released details on the Biden administration's efforts to combat human smuggling and unauthorized migration in conjunction with the Summit of the Americas held in Los Angeles. The series of operations launched across the Western Hemisphere is part of the largest human smuggling crackdown ever seen in the region, with more than 1,300 deployed personnel and nearly 2,000 smugglers arrested in just two months.

A similar incident occurred in San Antonio on July 23, 2017, when 39 migrants were found in a tractor-trailer in a Walmart parking lot. Ten of them died and 29 were injured. Eight of them died at the scene and two in the hospital. The deaths were found to have been caused by a combination of heat exposure and asphyxiation. The Walmart where the 2017 incident occurred is roughly 4 miles (6.4 km) from the 9600 block of Quintana Road, where the 2022 incident was discovered.

== Incident ==
On June 27, the tractor-trailer was discovered on Quintana Road by workers from a nearby business. The road runs parallel to Interstate 35, one of the major north–south routes in the central United States for traffic and commerce from the Southern border, which is often exploited by smugglers. A survivor of the truck claimed that the migrants had been waiting in a warehouse on the Texas side of the border before their cellphones were confiscated and they were loaded into the truck, which she believed to have chicken bouillon covering the floor. The truck made multiple stops to pick up additional migrants, and conditions in the truck deteriorated with people yelling about the heat and being unable to breathe, with the survivor stating there was minimal water brought by other migrants who crowded near the doors by the end as it was cooler.

San Antonio Police Chief William McManus reported that officers had received a call shortly before 6:00 p.m. after a person working nearby heard a cry for help. When the worker approached he saw several bodies stacked inside the tractor-trailer with the doors partially ajar. San Antonio Fire Department arrived and found many deceased individuals and others too weak to free themselves even with the doors ajar, due to heat stroke and exhaustion from lack of air-conditioning and water in 100 °F (38 °C) conditions. The truck driver, Homero Zamorano Jr was apparently unaware that the truck's air conditioning had failed, according to Christian Martinez who had been texting Zamorano details including a manifest for the truck and a location in Laredo, TX, on June 27.

A responding San Antonio Police officer stated that when they and other first responders arrived they moved many of the victims out of the trailer as they were prioritizing finding those that were still alive. First responders used K-9s to search the area for additional victims that may have attempted to find assistance, although no additional victims were found. Zamorano was seen attempting to flee the area, and followed by a police helicopter before he was later discovered by authorities hiding in a bush near the abandoned truck.

== Victims ==
Fifty-three people died in the incident with forty-six bodies discovered in the trailer. Three survivors died in the Baptist Health System hospital later that day and another the following day. The deceased were forty men and thirteen women with twenty-seven from Mexico, fourteen from Honduras, seven from Guatemala, and two from El Salvador.

Sixteen injured but conscious survivors, twelve adults and four children, were taken to medical facilities. The victims ranged in age 13 to 55.

== Legal proceedings ==
On June 28, 2022, Christian "Gordo" Martinez was taken into custody in Palestine, Texas. He and Zamorano Jr. have been charged with transportation of illegal immigrants resulting in death, which could result in life in prison. Martinez fell and broke his ankle while in lockup. He weighs around 670 pounds, and requested to be placed in home confinement due to health issues, but a judge denied his request.

Two more men were arrested; Juan Francisco D'Luna-Bilbao and Juan Claudio D'Luna-Mendez have been charged with possession of a weapon by an illegal alien, which could result in up to ten years in prison. Both men are Mexican citizens that illegally overstayed their tourist visas. On July 20, 2022, both were indicted on that charge.

On June 26, 2023, four new suspects, Felipe Orduna-Torres, Luis Alberto Rivera-Leal, Armando Gonzales-Ortega and Riley Covarrubias-Ponce were arrested in connection with the incident.

On August 21, 2024, Guatemalan police arrested 7 more suspects in connection to the incident. Six of these man are to face prosecution in Guatemala, while Rigoberto Ramon Miranda-Orozco has been charged with six counts related to migrant smuggling resulting in death or serious bodily injury, and faces maximum of life in prison. In March 2025, he was extradited to United States.

The tractor-trailer that was transporting the migrants was originally believed to be from a South Texas trucking company, Betancourt Trucking and Harvesting, but later found by investigators to be a clone of that company's trucks. It had the same color and identifying numbers from the federal Department of Transportation and Texas DOT as the Betancourt trucks, but did not carry the company's logo as the business do. A diagnostics test of the trucks computer also found it does not belong to Betancourt, according to the Texas Trucking Association.

=== Trials and guilty pleas ===
In June 2023, D'Luna-Bilbao pled guilty to charge of possession of a weapon by an illegal alien. His sentencing is scheduled for December 4, 2025. D'Luna Mendez later pled guilty to that charge as well and was sentenced to 28 months in prison and three years of supervised release.

On September 27, 2023, Martinez pled guilty to оnе соunt оf cоnѕріrасу tо trаnѕроrt illеgаl alіеnѕ rеѕultіng іn deаth, оnе соunt оf cоnѕріrасу tо trаnѕроrt alіеnѕ rеѕultіng іn sеrіоuѕ bоdіlу inјurу аnd plасіng lіvеѕ іn jеораrdу, оnе соunt оf trаnѕроrtаtіоn оf illеgаl aliеnѕ reѕultіng іn deаth, аnd аnоthеr соunt оf tranѕроrtаtіоn оf illеgаl alіеnѕ reѕultіng іn sеrіоuѕ bоdіlу inјurу аnd plасіng lіvеѕ іn jеораrdу. He faces up to life in prison at his sentencing on November 20, 2025.

On January 18, 2024, Covarrubias-Ponce pled guilty to one count of conspiracy to transport illegal aliens resulting in death; one count of conspiracy to transport aliens resulting in serious bodily injury and placing lives in jeopardy; one count of transportation of illegal aliens resulting in death; and one count of transportation of illegal aliens resulting in serious bodily injury and placing lives in jeopardy. He faces up to life in prison at his sentencing on November 6, 2025.

On February 28, 2024, Rivera-Leal pleaded guilty to one count of conspiracy to transport aliens placing lives in jeopardy. He faces a maximum penalty of 20 years in prison at his sentencing on November 13, 2025.

On January 16, 2025, Zamorano Jr. pleaded guilty to one count of conspiracy to transport aliens resulting in death, causing serious bodily injury, and placing lives in jeopardy; one count of transportation of aliens resulting in death; and one count of transportation of aliens resulting in serious bodily injury and placing lives in jeopardy. He faces up to life in prison at his sentencing on December 4, 2025.

After a two-week trial, Orduna-Torres and Gonzales-Ortega were convicted on March 18, 2025. On June 27, 2025, Orduna-Torres was sentenced to life in prison, while Gonzales-Ortega was sentenced to 83 years. Both men were also fined $250,000.

== Aftermath ==
The Consul General of the Mexican Consulate of San Antonio stated they had been inundated with concerned phone calls from family members of migrants who were concerned their relatives might be among the victims. All of the consulates from the home countries of the victims worked together to identify the victims and the repatriation of the victims.

A makeshift memorial was created on the road where the truck was discovered, with flowers, Virgen de Guadalupe candles and gallons of water left at the site. Many of those who visited the memorial wore merchandise of the Honduran national soccer team and prayed and showed the memorial to family and friends outside the United States through video calls. Another memorial was created farther down the road a few days after the first, built around pieces of clothing and shoes that were potentially from the migrants.

At least two Texas funeral homes have offered to help repatriate identified bodies back to their home countries in accordance with Texas laws, as at least one did for a similar tragedy in 2003 where nineteen migrants had died in a similar manner.

== Reactions ==
Mexican President Andrés Manuel López Obrador lamented the deaths and said that the Mexican government was ready to assist with US authorities. López Obrador went on to say that the tragedy was caused by "desperation" and "human trafficking". Guatemalan President Alejandro Giammattei also lamented the deaths and asked that punishments for human trafficking be increased and that it be made an extraditable crime. United States President Joe Biden called the incident horrifying and heartbreaking and blamed smugglers who had no regard for others lives which lead to innocent deaths, and promoted the continued anti-smuggling partnership at the borders.

Texas Governor Greg Abbott and Senator Ted Cruz blamed President Joe Biden, saying that his "open border" policies resulted in this and his "refusal to implement the law ... had deadly consequences". Abbott announced on June 29 that Texas would add truck checkpoints and the Department of Public Safety would create a new strategy where it would target trucks similar to the one used. He also stated Texas was creating two strike teams to detect, deter and apprehend unlawful crossings and be deployed to the border town of Eagle Pass, with additional units created as needed. San Antonio Mayor Ron Nirenberg called the discovery tragic and horrific, and he expressed the hope that those responsible would be prosecuted to the fullest extent of the law. San Antonio Fire Chief Charles Hood spoke of the tragedy and highlighted the impact it had on first responders, stating that, "We're not supposed to open a truck and see stacks of bodies in there ... none of us come to work imagining that."

== See also ==
- 2021 Imperial County car crash
- Burgenland corpses discovery
- Chiapas truck crash
- Dover lorry deaths
- Essex lorry deaths
- Migrant deaths along the Mexico–United States border
- Mozambique people smuggling disaster
- Ranong human-smuggling incident
