= Hong Kong–North Korea relations =

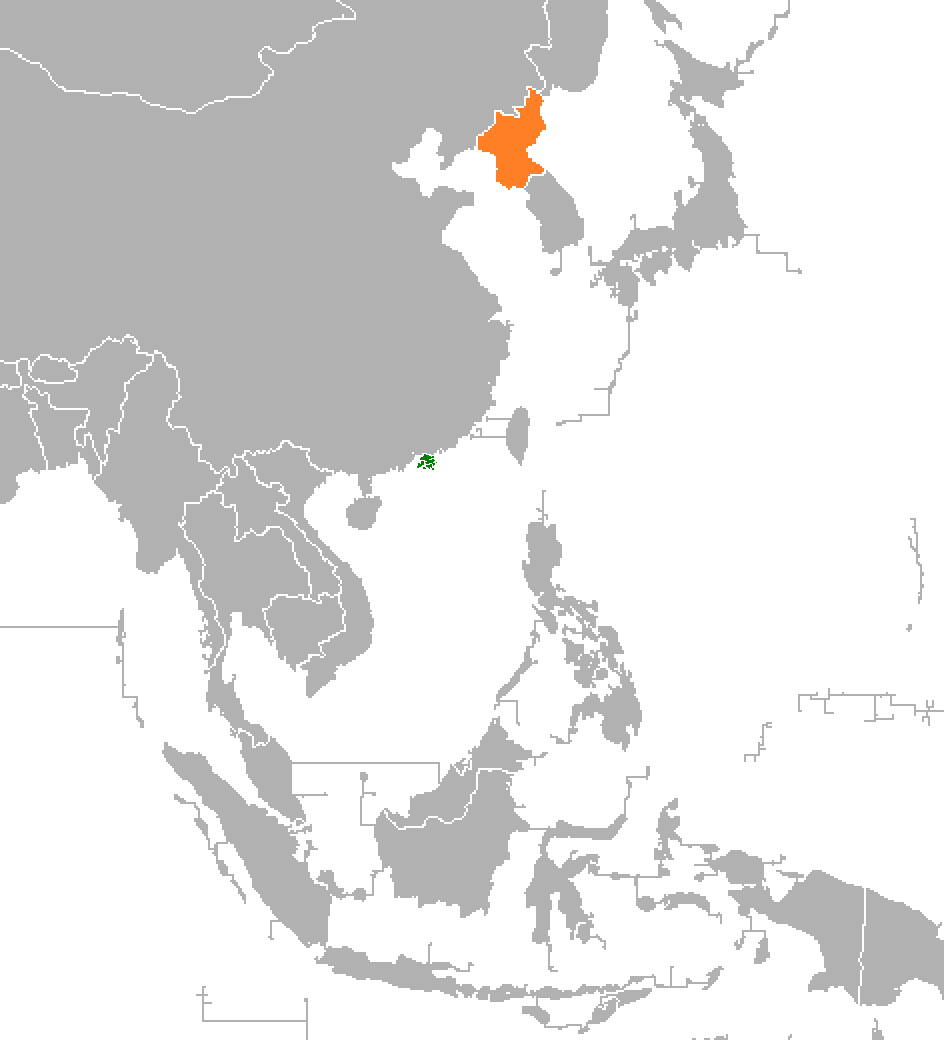

- Hong Kong: North Korea

Hong Kong and North Korea were bilateral relations existed from 2000 until 2023.

== History ==
From the establishment of Democratic People's Republic of Korea in 1945 until after the establishment of the Hong Kong Special Administrative Region in 1997, there were no official relations. During the Korean War and the Cold War, the two sides were on opposing sides. Hong Kong, as first a colony then a dependent territory of the United Kingdom, formed part of the capitalist camp led by the United States, while North Korea was an ally of the Soviet Union and Mainland China. Some Local Enlisted Personnel (LEP) joined with British Forces in combat in the Korean War. Hong Kong joined the embargo imposed on the communist bloc during the second half of the 20th century.

Following the transfer of sovereignty of Hong Kong to China, North Korea was able to open a Consulate-General in February 2000 by virtue of its diplomatic relations with Beijing, having previously not been allowed to establish a trade mission during British rule. The Consulate General is located in Wan Chai on Hong Kong Island. In October 2023, North Korean officials informed the Chinese the Consulate General would be closed as part of broad cutbacks in its diplomatic missions.

== Defectors from North Korea ==
Hong Kong had been involved in two cases of North Korean defectors. In 1996, a family of 16 people escaped from North Korea to Hong Kong via China. Among them five children and one pregnant woman applied for political asylum and were further transferred to South Korea.

In July 2016, Ri Jong-yol went to Hong Kong as part of the North Korean delegation for the International Mathematical Olympiad at Hong Kong University of Science and Technology; he defected immediately after he won a silver medal at the competition and sought refuge at the Consulate General of the Republic of Korea (South Korea) in Hong Kong. The defector eventually left for South Korea around the last week of September 2016 after staying about 80 days in Hong Kong.

== Economic relations ==
Hong Kong is the second largest trading partner of North Korea. Hong Kong and North Korea cooperate in several international organisations, with a focus on social and cultural issues. Despite Hong Kong being the second freest market economy in the world and North Korea being a planned economy, the economic success of Hong Kong had served as a model for the planning of the Sinuiju Special Administrative Region, described by its proponents as being the "Hong Kong of North Korea"; it ultimately never went into fruition due to Yang Bin's arrest by Chinese authorities.

== Cultural and educational ==
In December 2016, the Secretary of Education of Hong Kong, Eddie Ng attended a formal meeting with the newly appointed North Korean Consul-General, Jang Song Chol, in Hong Kong, discussing the current state of Hong Kong's education. Afterward, Ng posted on his Facebook page stating that he "anticipated exchanges in cultural and educational affairs will be strengthened in the future." Ng's statement was received negatively by the public, with netizens noting that North Korean style "brainwashing" should not be a shared common ground between Hong Kong and North Korea.
