= Essex lorry deaths =

Deaths of 39 Vietnamese in a lorry in 2019 in the UK

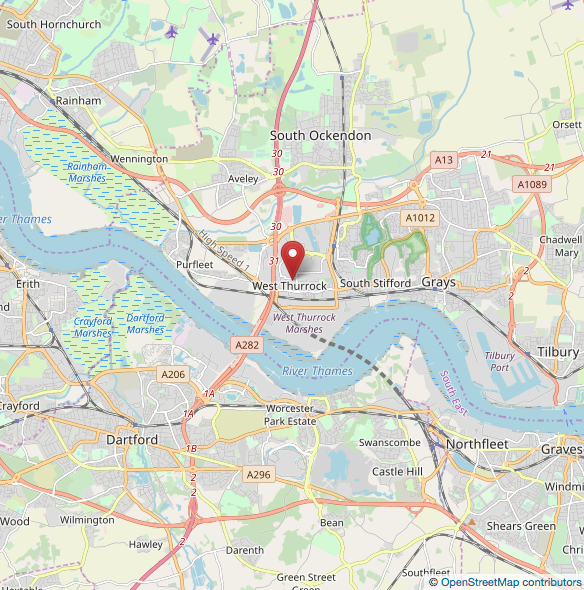
- The location where the bodies were discovered in Grays, Essex
- Date: 23 October 2019
- Location: Grays, Essex, United Kingdom; 51.4789°N 0.2733°E
- Deaths: 39
- Arrests: 15
- Charges: Manslaughter; Money laundering; Conspiracy to traffic people; Conspiracy to assist unlawful immigration

On 23 October 2019, the bodies of 39 people – 31 men and eight women, all Vietnamese nationals – were found in the trailer of an articulated refrigerator lorry in Grays, Essex, United Kingdom. The trailer had been shipped from the port of Zeebrugge, Belgium, to Purfleet, Essex, UK, and the lorry cab and its driver are believed to have originated from Northern Ireland. Investigations involving the national authorities of the UK, Belgium, Ireland and Vietnam have been led by Essex Police.

Eleven people were convicted of crimes related to the incident in the UK and a further 19 were jailed in Belgium.

== Lorry ==
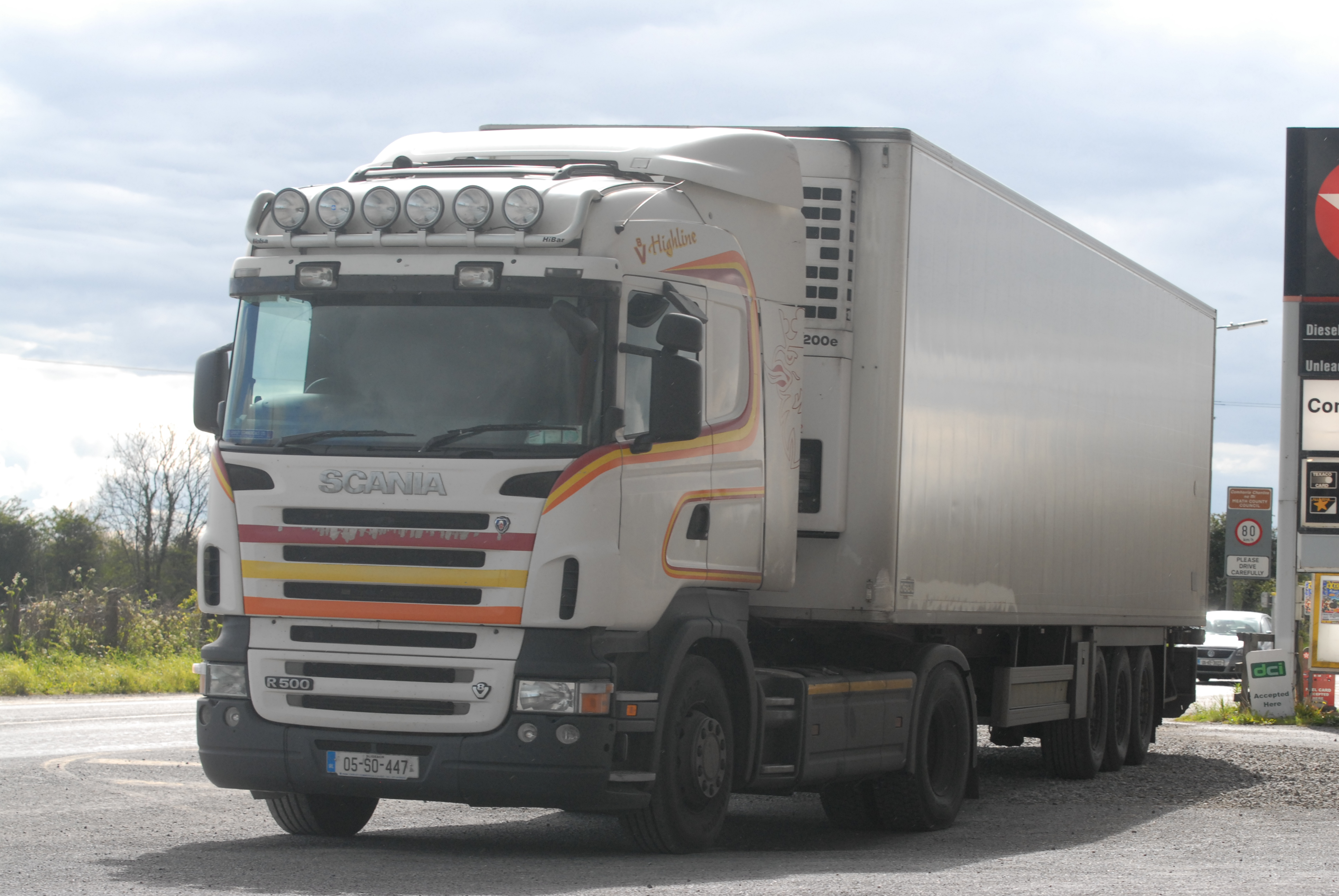
A refrigerated articulated lorry, similar to the type involved in the incident

The lorry cab, a Scania R620, was registered in Bulgaria in 2017 in the name of a company owned by an Irish citizen, but had not returned there since, according to the Bulgarian foreign ministry. The refrigerated trailer was leased on 15 October from a rental company in County Monaghan, Republic of Ireland. Refrigerated trailers can be kept airtight and frozen to preserve perishables, which could lead to an occupant dying of suffocation or hypothermia should they become trapped inside.

The lorry cab and the trailer arrived separately in Purfleet, Essex, from where they travelled together the short distance to Grays. Police believe that the cab was driven from Northern Ireland on 19 October. It then travelled through the Republic of Ireland to Dublin, and from there by sea to Holyhead in Wales, from where it was driven to Purfleet. The trailer was loaded onto the freight ferry Clementine in Zeebrugge in Belgium. GPS data showed it had previously travelled to Dunkirk and Lille in France and Bruges in Belgium. It arrived in Purfleet, a town with a port on the Thames, at around 00:30 on 23 October and was picked up with the cab there about half-an-hour later.

The Zeebrugge port chairman said it was "highly unlikely" the migrants entered the trailer there, and that breaking the seal, loading 39 people and resealing the trailer without being noticed would be "virtually impossible".

== Incident ==
Essex lorry deaths (Essex)

On 23 October 2019, shortly after 01:40 BST, staff of the East of England Ambulance Service responded to a 999 call made by the driver, Maurice Robinson, who found 39 bodies in a refrigerated articulated lorry. The lorry was in Eastern Avenue at the Waterglade Industrial Park in Grays, Essex. The ambulance service informed Essex Police, who arrived shortly afterwards.

Soon after the police arrived, Eastern Avenue was closed and not fully re-opened until 25 October. The lorry driver was a 25-year-old man from Portadown, County Armagh, Northern Ireland. He was arrested at the scene on suspicion of murder.

== Fatalities ==
The ambulance service said that all 39 people were dead before it arrived, and attempts at resuscitation could not be made. The deceased – 31 males and eight females – included 10 teenagers; the two youngest were 15-year-old boys.

They are believed to have been either victims of human trafficking (for example, as forced labourers), migrants who paid smugglers to move them to the United Kingdom, or both. Smugglers often force migrants to work off the cost of the trip in slave-like conditions. There have been a number of incidents in which migrants to Europe died or were injured as a result of dangerous transportation methods. It is often compared to the 2000 Dover incident which 58 Chinese nationals died in similar circumstances.

On 23 November, it was reported that one of the teenagers later found dead had gone missing from an asylum centre in the Netherlands.

On 11 February 2020, Essex Police said that post-mortems gave a combination of hypoxia and hyperthermia as the provisional causes of death.

=== Identification ===
Initially the Deputy Chief Constable of Essex Police released a statement, "All are believed to be Chinese nationals". The Chinese embassy in London sent officials to assist with identification.

On 2 November, police clarified they were all Vietnamese. The family of a 26-year-old Vietnamese woman made public her last text message to her parents which she sent as she was dying; her family said they paid around £30,000 to smuggle their daughter from Vietnam to the UK.

On 3 November, Vietnamese officials provided DNA samples from people in Nghệ An Province and essential documents to help identify the deceased. By 7 November, all of the deceased had been formally identified. Names, ages and hometowns were released on 8 November; 20 were from Nghệ An Province, 10 from Hà Tĩnh, four from Hải Phòng, three from Quảng Bình and two from Thừa Thiên-Huế.

== Investigation ==
A murder investigation was launched on the morning of the day of the discovery. The investigation was the "largest mass fatality victim identification" investigation in the history of Essex Police. The National Crime Agency suggested that organised crime might be involved. The investigation was led by Detective Chief Inspector Daniel Stoten, a Senior Investigating Officer within the Kent and Essex Serious Crime Directorate. The lorry and bodies were moved from the scene to a secure location in Tilbury Docks, another nearby port on the Thames, to continue the investigation. Police later moved the bodies to a mortuary at Broomfield Hospital in Chelmsford for post-mortems to be carried out.

Taoiseach Leo Varadkar spoke in Dáil Éireann and said that Irish authorities would investigate any involvement regarding their country. The police suspected that an Irish people-smuggling ring which had been under investigation for around a year might be involved.

In the evening of 23 October, the Belgian prosecutor's office announced that they would also investigate the lorry's transit through their country. Belgian officials said the people were trapped in the trailer for at least 10 hours.

On 24 October, the Evening Standard speculated that the trailer had travelled from the Netherlands before its departure from Belgium. British police had also searched two properties in Northern Ireland.

== Arrests and charges ==
=== 2019 ===
On 25 October, police arrested a man and a woman from Warrington, Cheshire, on suspicion of manslaughter and conspiracy to traffic people, and another man at Stansted Airport regarding the same offences. On 27 October, it was announced that these three had been released on bail. After extended questioning, on 26 October Essex Police charged the driver they had arrested with 39 counts of manslaughter, conspiracy to traffic people, conspiracy to assist unlawful immigration and money laundering. He appeared at Chelmsford Magistrates' Court on 28 October, when the Crown Prosecution Service alleged that he was part of a "global ring" of people smugglers. He was remanded in custody, to appear at the Central Criminal Court on 25 November.

On 26 October, the Irish police said they had detained a man in his 20s at Dublin Port who was of interest to Essex Police as part of its investigation into the lorry deaths. He was charged with unrelated offences. A Belgian public prosecutor said that this was the lorry driver they had been searching for, who had been seen on CCTV ten times at Zeebrugge while dropping off the refrigerated trailer. Two days later, the prosecutor said that the lorry driver pretended that the trailer was filled with cookies and biscuits.

On 29 October, Essex Police announced that two brothers from Armagh, Northern Ireland, one of whom owned the haulage company operating the lorry cab detained at Grays, were wanted on suspicion of manslaughter and human trafficking offences related to the incident. On 20 April 2020, one of the brothers, a 40-year-old man, was arrested by Gardaí in the Republic of Ireland on a European Arrest Warrant and charged with 39 counts of manslaughter and immigration offences.

On 1 November, a man from Northern Ireland was re-arrested in the holding cells of the Criminal Courts of Justice in Dublin following the execution of a European Arrest Warrant issued in the UK. He was charged with 41 offences, including 39 of manslaughter, and extradition proceedings began in the Irish High Court. In February 2020, the man was given leave to appeal the extradition judgment.

On 4 November, Vietnamese police arrested eight suspects in the central province of Nghệ An in connection with the smuggling ring. In February 2020 five men and two women were charged in Vietnam with "organising or broking others to flee abroad or stay abroad illegally".

=== 2020 ===
On 29 January 2020, a man from Essex, who was the subject of a European Arrest Warrant, was detained in Frankfurt. He was returned to the UK where he was charged with 39 counts of manslaughter and conspiracy to assist unlawful immigration.

On 9 February 2020, a man was arrested in Northern Ireland on suspicion of manslaughter and facilitating unlawful immigration, and was released on bail.

On 4 March 2020, a man from Essex was charged with an immigration offence related to the deaths. The offence allegedly occurred between May 2018 and October 2019. On 16 March 2020, a man from Birmingham was charged with an immigration offence related to the incident. The man is accused of "conspiring to smuggle non-EU nationals into the UK, contrary to immigration law, between 1 May 2018 and 24 October 2019."

On 17 April 2020, a 42-year-old man from Tottenham was charged with an immigration offence related to the deaths. He was accused of "conspiracy to facilitate the commission of a breach of UK immigration law by a non-EU person". On 20 April 2020 a 40-year-old man was arrested in the Republic of Ireland in connection with the deaths. He faced 39 charges of manslaughter as well as immigration offences. On 29 April 2020 he appeared before the High Court via videolink, during which he was described as the "ringleader" of a criminal gang. His solicitor applied for bail and the prosecution opposed it. Bail was refused on 30 April.

On 26 May 2020, French and Belgian police announced the arrest of 26 people suspected of human trafficking in relation to the Essex lorry deaths. Authorities said a series of simultaneous early morning raids had taken place in both countries on 25 May 2020. The police operation was organised with a cross-border team organised by Eurojust that included Belgium, France, the UK and Ireland. Thirteen people were arrested in France.

On 15 December 2020, a Vietnamese man who was believed to have been involved in transporting 10 of the 39 migrants from a safehouse in Anderlecht was arrested in Redditch by National Crime Agency officers on a European Arrest Warrant issued by a Belgian judge.

=== 2021 ===
On 17 March 2021, Caolan Gormley, a 23-year-old haulier from Caledon, County Tyrone was charged with conspiracy to assist illegal immigration in connection with the deaths. On 14 April 2021, Gormley pleaded not guilty, with a trial date set for November 2023. On 30 November 2023 he was convicted and jailed for seven years.

In June 2021, Italian authorities and the National Crime Agency arrested a 27-year-old Romanian man near Milan in connection with the deaths, charging him with conspiracy to assist unlawful immigration and encouraging or assisting the commission of an offence.

On 17 June 2021, a Vietnamese man who is being sought by Belgian authorities for extradition in connection with the deaths was arrested at a supermarket petrol station in Middlesbrough. A National Crime Agency spokesman said that the individual was "suspected by the Belgian authorities of having played a key role in placing at least 10 migrants inside that lorry."

=== 2022 ===
In July 2022, Essex Police released an image of a man who is wanted in connection with the deaths. 48 year old Romanian national Marius Mihai Draghici is believed to be part of the conspiracy to smuggle the migrants into the UK. He was detained in Bucharest in August.

== Court appearances ==
On 25 November 2019, Maurice Robinson pleaded guilty in the Central Criminal Court to conspiring with others to assist illegal immigration and acquiring criminal property. He was remanded in custody until 13 December when he appeared in court, via a video link from Belmarsh Prison in London where he was being held until his trial. On 8 April 2020, he pleaded guilty to the manslaughter of the 39 victims.

A second man, from County Armagh, also appeared at the Central Criminal Court on 13 December and pleaded not guilty to conspiracy to commit human trafficking offences between 1 May 2018 and 24 October 2019, by arranging or facilitating the travel of other people with a view to exploitation. He also denied conspiring to assist unlawful immigration over the same period, but did not enter any plea regarding 39 charges of manslaughter with which he was charged.

=== Extradition hearings ===
On 15 May 2020, Ronan Hughes, the man accused of being a ringleader, attended the High Court in Ireland by video link from Cloverhill Prison in Dublin. Counsel for the defence argued that many of the alleged offences occurred outside the jurisdiction of the United Kingdom and that the extradition warrant was unclear about whether the United Kingdom was asserting that the alleged offences occurred in UK jurisdiction or were extraterritorial. Counsel for the Minister for Justice, Ronan Kennedy SC disagreed, calling the claim of extraterritoriality a red herring and that the court should not engage in a "fanciful debate" as to whether other states had jurisdiction to try these offences. The counsel for the state pointed out that the 39 people died after the trailer had entered the UK and that it was nonsensical to suggest their deaths had occurred anywhere other than the UK. The fact that many locations were mentioned in the warrant did not mean that the offences were extraterritorial and the accused was in the UK and had acted to further an act of conspiracy that underpinned the charges of manslaughter. Judge Burns remanded the accused until 12 June 2020, when Ireland's High Court ordered his extradition to the UK.

On 28 August 2020, Ronan Hughes, from County Armagh, pleaded guilty to the manslaughter of 39 people found in the trailer. Alexandru-Ovidiu Hanga, of Tilbury, and Gazmir Nuzi, of Tottenham, also pleaded guilty to assisting unlawful immigration in June and September 2020 respectively.

In January 2021, an extradition hearing was held at Westminster Magistrates' Court for a Vietnamese man, said to be aged 18, who appeared via videolink from HM Prison Wandsworth accused of transporting 10 of the 39 from a safehouse in Anderlecht. In March 2021, the man appeared in court again accused by Belgian authorities of being a member of a criminal organisation, being involved in human trafficking and using forged documents. He was described as an organiser for the people-trafficking organisation, arranging accommodation and transit for money. On 8 April 2021, his extradition was approved.

=== Old Bailey hearings ===
On 21 December 2020, verdicts were returned on Romanian ringleader Gheorghe Nica of Basildon and lorry driver Eamonn Harrison from County Down. Both were found guilty of manslaughter and conspiracy to transport and assist illegal migrants. In addition, Valentin Calota from Birmingham and Christopher Kennedy, from County Armagh, were found guilty of immigration offences. Sentencing hearings for all eight guilty men are expected in January 2021. Prosecutors are considering charges against a further three people. In February 2023, Marius Mihai Draghici declined to enter pleas when charged with 39 counts of manslaughter and conspiracy to assist unlawful immigration. He is in custody pending his scheduled trial in November.

== Sentencing ==
=== In the UK ===
On 11 January 2021, Gazmir Nuzi was sentenced to 10 months imprisonment after admitting a limited role in the smuggling ring, with the prosecution accepting that he was not part of the organised crime group. He was immediately released having already served his sentence in custody.

On 22 January 2021, the culprits were jailed for the incident. Four people received a custodial sentence of at least 13 years. The two main offenders, Ronan Hughes and Gheorghe Nica, were given 20 years (for 39 counts of manslaughter and conspiring to bring people into the country unlawfully) and 27 years (for manslaughter and people-smuggling), respectively.

Two lorry drivers who were also involved in the incident were also jailed. Eamonn Harrison, who delivered the trailer to Zeebrugge, was sentenced to 18 years. Maurice Robinson, who collected the trailer from Purfleet and discovered the dead bodies, was sentenced to 13 years and 4 months.

Three other men were sentenced for conspiring to facilitate unlawful immigration: lorry driver Christopher Kennedy was sentenced to seven years, pickup driver Valentin Calota was sentenced to four and a half years and Alexandru-Ovidiu Hanga was sentenced to three years.

On 21 March 2022, Dragos-Stefan Damian was jailed for three years and ten months after being found guilty of conspiracy to assist unlawful immigration.

On 11 July 2023, Marius Draghici was jailed for 12 years and 7 months.

On 30 November 2023, Caolan Gormley was jailed for seven years for conspiracy to assist unlawful immigration after he was found to have 'close dealings' with the traffickers.

=== In Belgium ===
In January 2022, 19 people were convicted in Belgium of being part of a people smuggling ring connected to the deaths, including the ringleader Vo Van Hong who was sentenced to 15 years in prison. All of the others convicted were Vietnamese or Belgians of Vietnamese origin and were accused of buying supplies for the migrants, transporting them in taxis or acting as look-outs at safe houses.

== Media bias ==
Seventy-seven reports by The Guardian and The Times were studied by Yang (2021). The text corpus were found to have "manipulated emotions to emphasize that China, whether in 2000 or 2019, was a backward and underdeveloped country where citizens tried all means to escape to Britain. However, when British journalists found that the victims were Vietnamese instead of Chinese, they shifted attention to the pitiful Vietnamese families of the victims and tended to arouse readers’ sympathy".

The Associated Press ran an article that remarked "Weeks prior to the discovery in England of the bodies of 39 people believed to be from China, Beijing was holding lavish National Day celebrations congratulating itself on its rise from an impoverished Asian giant to the world’s second largest economy." CNN reporter Aimee Lewis wrote a similar piece. CNN reporter David Culver asked a similar question to China's Foreign Ministry and got rebuffed by spokesperson Hua Chunying. When the victims were found to be Vietnamese, CNN was criticised by Chinese state media and netizens.

== Reactions ==
=== United Kingdom ===
==== Political ====
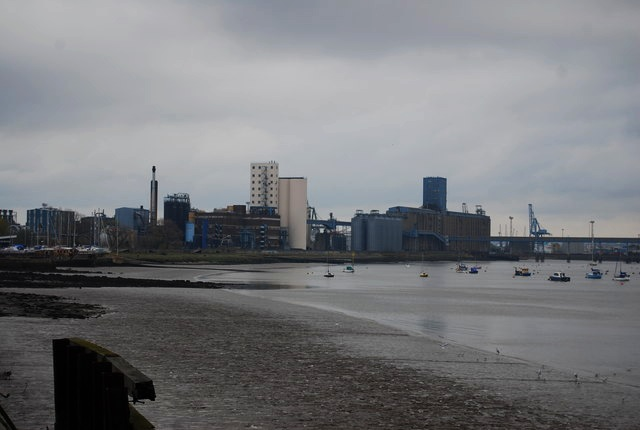
Grays from the Thameside

UK Prime Minister Boris Johnson said in a tweet that he was "appalled" at the incident, giving his thoughts to the victims and their families, adding that the Home Office was working alongside Essex Police on the case. Priti Patel, the Home Secretary, said that she was "shocked and saddened by this utterly tragic incident", and that Immigration Enforcement were working with the Essex Police. António Guterres, the United Nations secretary-general, tweeted that those responsible "must be swiftly brought to justice". Diane Abbott, Shadow Home Secretary, said greater international co-operation was needed to prevent similar events happening again.

Extra UK immigration officers are to be deployed at the Belgian border port of Zeebrugge and more Border Force staff will operate at Purfleet as a result of the incident.

Campaigners against human trafficking organised a vigil to take place outside the Home Office on 24 October in solidarity with the casualties. Following the incident, the Chief Executive of the charity group Joint Council for the Welfare of Immigrants said that the British government needs to open safe routes and make quick decisions regarding asylum seekers to prevent such attempts, sentiments echoed by the Refugee and Migrant Rights Director of Amnesty International UK. Other refugee groups have expressed concern that the border confusion surrounding Brexit will give more opportunities for groups to commit similar crimes.

==== Postponement of television show ====
Channel 4 postponed a television series called Smuggled that was due to air on 28 October, in which British citizens try to smuggle themselves from mainland Europe to the UK. The first part was broadcast on 4 November after re-editing in the light of the 39 deaths, despite the Home Office describing the timing as "both insensitive and irresponsible". Channel 4 defended its decision as meeting its public service obligations, arguing that revelation of the ease with which people could be smuggled into Britain had become a "matter of urgent public interest".

=== Vietnam ===
==== Political ====
After reports that Vietnamese citizens might be among the deceased, Nguyễn Xuân Phúc, Vietnamese Prime Minister, ordered the country's Public Security Ministry and the authorities of its two central provinces of Hà Tĩnh and Nghệ An, where a number of missing citizens come from, to launch a probe into the case. He also urged his country's Foreign Ministry to direct the Vietnamese embassy in UK to closely monitor the situation, co-ordinate with the British authorities to verify the identities of the victims and take protective measures in case it was confirmed Vietnamese were among them. After confirmation that they were all from Vietnam, the Vietnamese government strongly condemned human trafficking and called on all countries to combat such activities to prevent a recurrence of the incident.

==== Families of casualties ====
Families of those who died told reporters that they had been told that neither the British nor Vietnamese governments were willing to cover the cost of repatriating the bodies back to their homes. The deputy chair of the Can Lộc District, had reportedly been told by officials that the Vietnamese government offered to only pay the costs of bringing the bodies "home from the airport" and would pay in advance on behalf of the families only if the families would later pay them back. A father of one of the deceased said he was given two options: having the ashes returned for 41,100,000 Vietnam dong (£1,470) or receiving the body for 66,240,000 Vietnam dong (£2,209).

An international fundraiser through GoFundMe raised money to help cover the potential additional debts that the families might incur bringing home the deceased. Additionally, money was donated by Vingroup, and other Vietnamese associations across Europe. By the end of November, all bodies had been repatriated to Vietnam. Families were worried they could still be left in debt, despite over £84,000 having been raised to help them.

== Popular media ==
In October 2021, the BBC broadcast the hour-long documentary Hunting the Essex Lorry Killers.

Container 39, a Vietnamese web series about this case, directed by Tran Ka My, was released in 2022.

== See also ==
- 2022 San Antonio migrant deaths
- Min Ping Yu No. 5540 incident in Taiwan, 1990
- Burgenland corpses discovery
- Dover lorry deaths
- Mozambique people smuggling disaster
- Ranong human-smuggling incident
- List of migrant vehicle incidents in Europe
