= Chinese people in the Netherlands =

Ethnic group

Chinese people in the Netherlands Chinezen in Nederland 荷蘭華人/荷兰华人
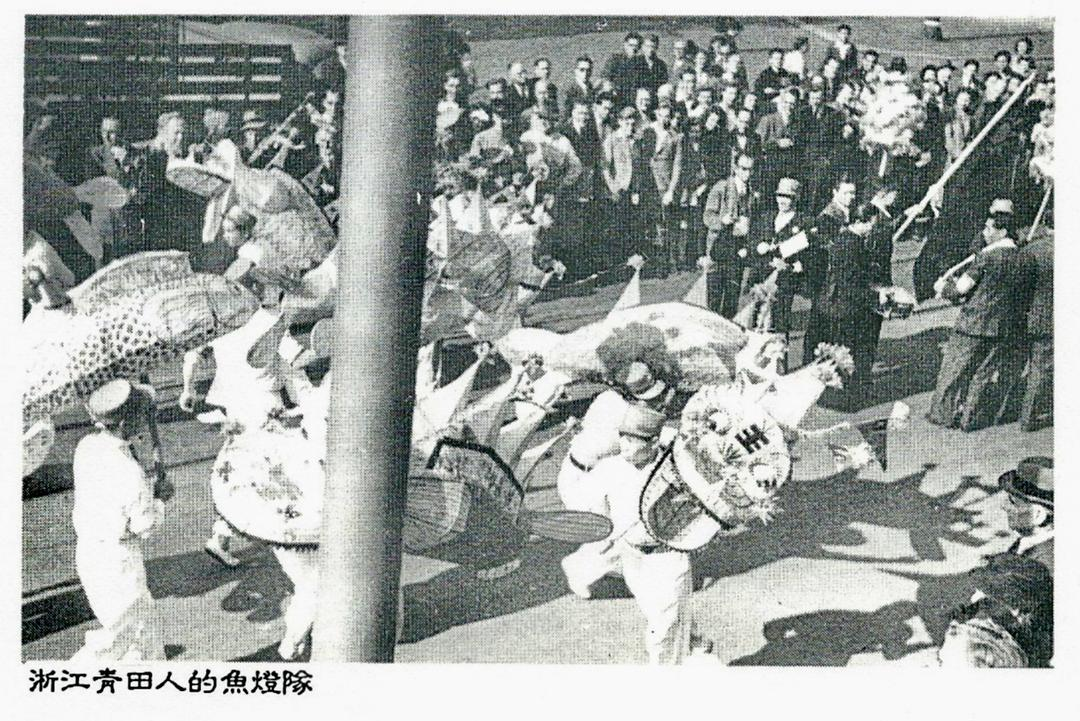
- A cohort of Chinese from Qingtian celebrating the victory of World War II in Holland with fish lantern procession (鱼灯舞), 1945

Total population
- 84,453 (2022); 0.48% of the population Statistics for people born in the People's Republic of China or the Republic of China and their children only

Regions with significant populations
- Rotterdam (6,500); Amsterdam (5,000); Eindhoven (3,200)

Languages
- Dutch; Indonesian (incl Javanese and Malay); Sranan Tongo; Chinese dialects (largely Cantonese and Hakka among older migrants and their descendants; circa 2002 recent expatriates typically speak Mandarin, Wenzhounese, Qingtian dialect, Eastern Min, and Southern Min)

Religion
- Buddhism (~18.7%); Chinese folk religion Taoism; Christianity

Related ethnic groups
- Overseas Chinese

Chinese people in the Netherlands (Dutch: Chinezen in Nederland; Chinese: 荷蘭華人/荷兰华人) form one of the largest overseas Chinese populations in continental Europe. In 2022 official statistics showed 84,453 people originating from the People's Republic of China (PRC) (including Hong Kong) and Republic of China (ROC), or people with at least one such parent. However, these statistics do not capture the whole size of the Chinese community, which since its earliest days has included not just migrants from China, but people of Chinese ethnicity drawn from among overseas Chinese communities as well.

== Migration history ==
Early Chinese labour migration to the Netherlands was drawn primarily from two sources: peddlers from Qingtian, Zhejiang who began arriving in the country after World War I, and seamen of Guangdong origin drawn from among the British Chinese community; the latter had initially been brought in as strikebreakers in 1911. During the Great Depression, many of the seamen were laid off and also took to street peddling, especially of pindakoekjes (peanut cakes); the Dutch referred to them as "pindaman" ("peanut man"). Their numbers dropped as a result of voluntary outmigration and deportations; by World War II, fewer than 1,000 remained.

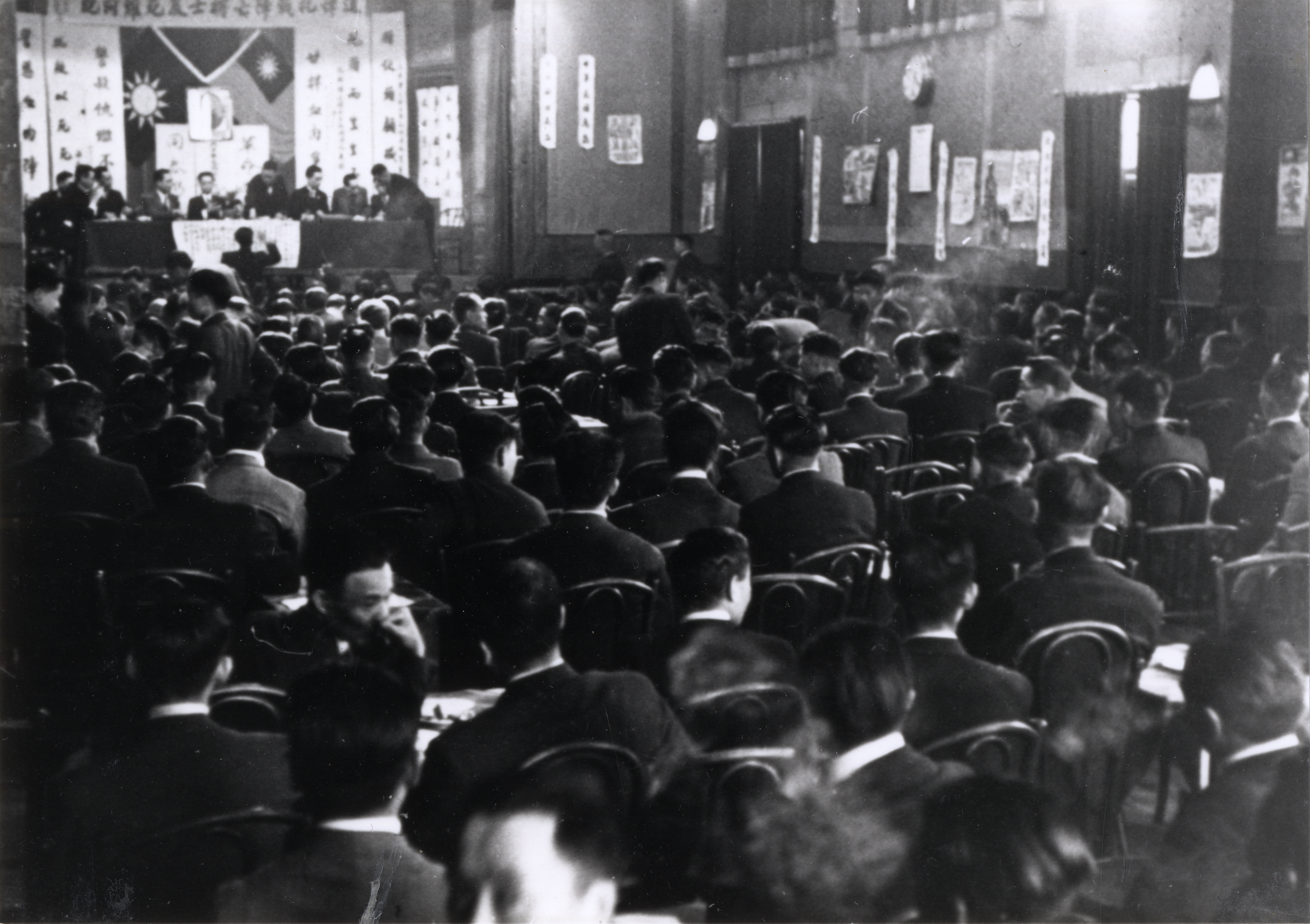
Commemoration ceremony of the Chinese organization Chung Hwa Hui in Amicitia in The Hague

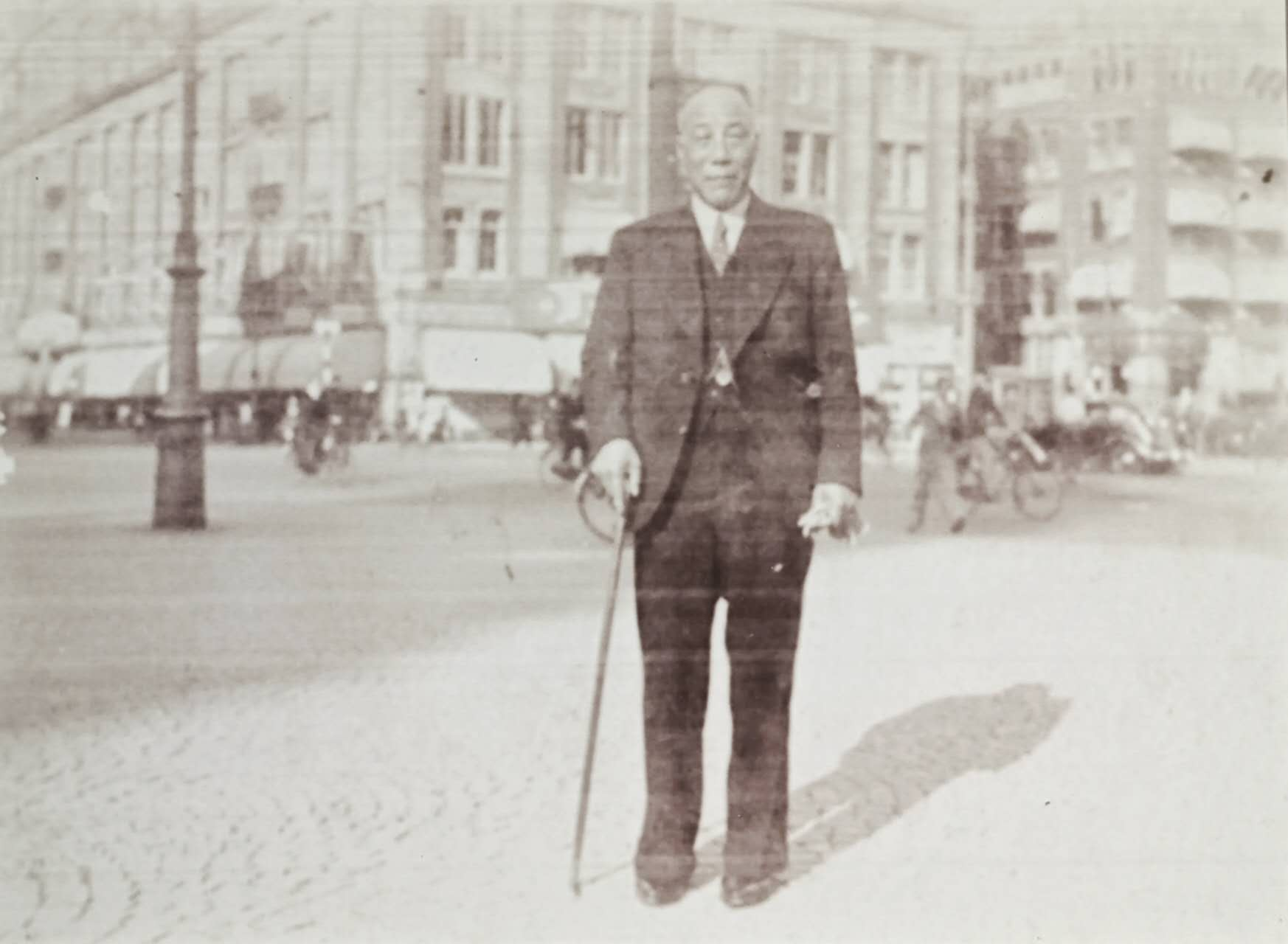
Picture of Wang Zhinan (王志南), a Chinese of Qingtianese descent in the Netherlands, 1930s.

Another group of early ethnic Chinese in the Netherlands were students; they were largely not from China, however, but were instead drawn from among Chinese communities in the Dutch East Indies. From a group of 20 in 1911, their numbers continued to increase, interrupted only by World War II; in 1957, out of the roughly 1,400 ethnic Chinese from Indonesia in the Netherlands, 1,000 were students. In 1911, these students established the Chung Hwa Hui, which was in contact with various Chinese organizations and political parties in Europe. Largely of Peranakan origin, the students tended to speak Indonesian local languages as their mother tongues, and had already done their early education at Dutch-medium schools. However, with increasing tensions in Indonesia–Netherlands relations in the late 1950s and early 1960s, the number of students dropped off sharply.

Though the number of Chinese students from Indonesia dropped off, tens of thousands of ethnic Chinese were forced to leave the country due to the violent political situation in Indonesia in 1965. Most went to China, the United States, or Australia, but those who had been educated in Dutch preferentially chose the Netherlands as their destination; there are no exact statistics, but the migrants themselves estimate that about 5,000 arrived during this period. As with the students, these migrants tended to speak no Chinese, with Indonesian languages as their mother tongues and Dutch as their academic language. In the late 1970s and early 1980s, Hong Kong also became a significant source of Chinese migrants to the Netherlands, with about 600 to 800 per year, falling off to around 300 to 400 per year by the late 1980s.

Also in the 1980s, the Netherlands began to become a popular choice for students from mainland China. Factors which influenced this popularity included the tuition fees, which were relatively lower than those in the United Kingdom, and the ease of obtaining a student visa as compared to the United States. In the beginning, these were PRC government-financed students, consisting of top students selected by examination, and gained admission at prestigious Dutch universities such as Leiden University. However, in the 1990s, more privately financed students, students on Dutch scholarships, and short-term exchange students began to arrive. By 2002, embassy figures showed roughly 4,000 PRC students in the Netherlands.

== Demographic characteristics ==
As of 2012, figures from the Netherlands' Centraal Bureau voor de Statistiek showed:

- Persons born outside of the Netherlands:
  - 41,533 mainland China-born persons (19,466 men, 22,067 women)
  - 9,757 Hong Kong-born persons (4,808 men, 4,949 women)
  - 83 Macau-born persons (31 men, 52 women)
  - 2,254 Taiwan-born persons (830 men, 1,424 women)
- Persons born in the Netherlands:
  - 17,564 persons with at least one parent born in China (9,002 men, 8,562 women)
  - 8,440 persons with at least one parent born in Hong Kong (4,300 men, 4,140 women)
  - 36 persons with at least one parent born in Macau (18 men, 18 women)
  - 531 persons with at least one parent born in Taiwan (273 men, 258 women)

Totalling 80,198 persons. This represents growth of 92.8% compared to the population in 1996, the earliest year for which statistics are available. However, the various groups within the population show sharply differing growth trends. The number of persons of mainland Chinese background grew by 152% over that same period, with both overseas-born and Dutch-born segments showing a similar level of growth. In contrast, the number of persons of Hong Kong background has shown only mild growth, entirely due to natural increase rather than additional migration; in fact the stock of Hong Kong migrants fell by 5.6% during the same period.

There is also migration of Surinamese Hakkas to the Netherlands who constitute about 10% of the Chinese population.

The Chinese in the Netherlands are not particularly geographically concentrated; more than half work in the restaurant trade, and because they prefer to open Chinese restaurants where they have less competition, they tend to spread out to towns all over the country. Amsterdam has a Chinatown, but it is purely a commercial district, rather than a mixed-use residential/commercial district as in Chinatowns in other countries. Rotterdam and The Hague also have similar districts.

== Integration and community ==
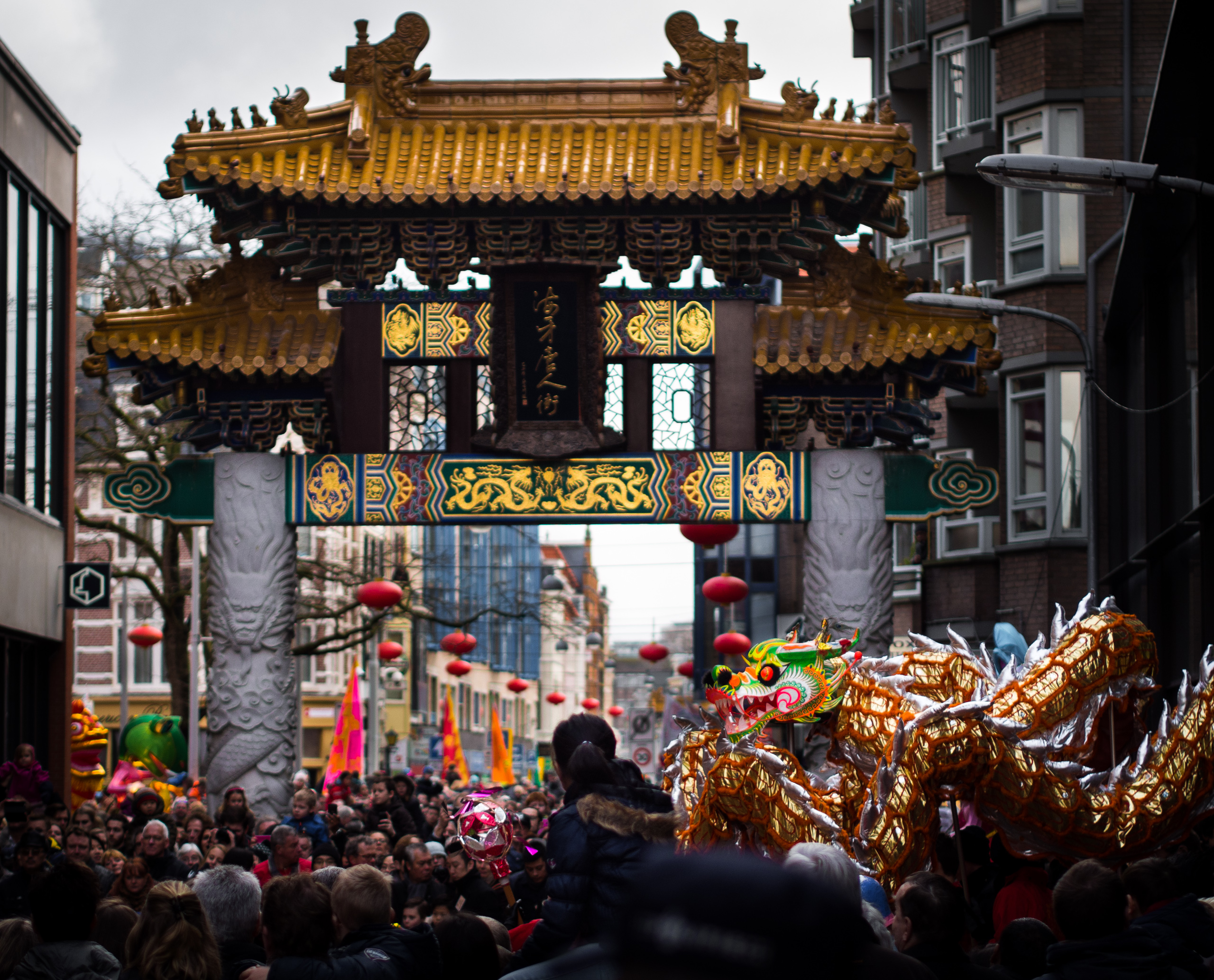
Chinese New Year celebrations in the Chinatown of The Hague, at the start of the Year of the Goat

Chinese students themselves, comparing the Netherlands to the United States, state that the Netherlands offers a peaceful and not-particularly-challenging life, but fewer opportunities; one popular saying among them is that excellent students find the Netherlands too small to fulfill their ambitions, and leave of their own volition, while average and below-average students are forced out of the country entirely.

Chinese in the Netherlands are often perceived to be "snakeheads", participating in smuggling Chinese migrants from Eastern Europe to the United Kingdom. In the 1980s, the Dutch government, considering the poor Dutch language abilities and lack of integration by many members of the Chinese community, began to consider officially recognising them as a disadvantaged minority, similar to Moroccan or Turkish migrants. This proved to be extremely controversial among the Chinese community; the widespread discussions in Dutch media of the problems in the community led to public perception of the Chinese as illegal migrants working for low pay and incapable of solving their own community problems, strongly embarrassing members of older generations who had stressed "invisibility and self-reliance". In the end, the government did not grant the Chinese official minority status as the Chinese did not want government subsidies and minority status. However, stereotypical mainstream views only strengthened, especially as a result of several heavily publicised tragedies such as the 2000 Dover incident, in which 58 Chinese migrants suffocated in a refrigerated container on their way from the Netherlands to Dover, England.

There are also some intra-community tensions between recent expatriates, especially students, and the older overseas Chinese. The latter are largely Cantonese-speaking, while the former use Mandarin as their lingua franca. The divide shows up most clearly in the education of children; few international students send their children to the schools established by the old overseas Chinese, deriding them as low-quality schools "for the children of the restaurant families" and employing low-quality teachers. In contrast, the old overseas Chinese describe the students as arrogant, and view themselves as the "real representatives of the Chinese community in the Netherlands".

The descendants of Indonesian-speaking Chinese tend to stay out of such conflict; having largely entered the liberal professions they also look down on the "restaurant Chinese", but in return other Chinese often view them as not "really Chinese". They rarely join any of the associations set up by other Chinese migrants or their descendants, instead preferring their own associations.

== Notable individuals ==
- Oen Giok Khouw (1874–1927), landowner and philanthropist
- Loa Sek Hie (1898–1965), politician and landowner
- Zhong Song (1900–1995), former officer of the National Revolutionary Army
- Thung Sin Nio (1902–1996), women's rights activist, physician, economist, and politician
- Teddy Yip (1907–2003), businessman and Formula One team owner
- Chung Mon (1918–1975), businessman and criminal
- Dolf Wong Lun Hing (1921–2017), sculptor and illustrator
- Ding Hou (1921-2008), botanist and mycologist
- Thé Tjong-Khing (born 1933), illustrator
- Guillaume Lo-A-Njoe (born 1937), visual artist
- Fong Leng (born 1937), fashion designer
- William Man A Hing (born 1937), jurist and visual artist
- Carry-Ann Tjong Ayong (born 1941), writer
- Anton Foek (born 1941), radio and television producer and journalist
- John Lie A Fo (born 1945), visual artist
- Roy Ho Ten Soeng (born 1945), politician
- Lilian Gonçalves-Ho Kang You (born 1946), human rights activist
- Ing Yoe Tan (1948–2020), politician
- Sandra Reemer (1950–2017), singer and television presenter
- Chiu Yen-Ming (born 1951), writer and painter
- Ang Kiem Soei (1952–2015), drug criminal
- Varina Tjon-A-Ten (born 1952), politician
- Khee Liang Phoa (born 1955), politician
- Tschen La Ling (born 1956), football player
- Lulu Wang (born 1960), writer
- Chow Yiu-Fai (born 1961), professor and lyricist
- Yang Bin (born 1963), businessman and criminal
- Ricardo Moniz (born 1964), football player and manager
- Humberto Tan (born 1965), radio and television presenter, journalist, and writer
- Fiona Tan (born 1966), visual artist
- Robert Oey (born 1966), film director
- Monika Sie Dhian Ho (born 1967), political scientist
- Aron Winter (born 1967), football player and manager
- Peng Zhaoqin (born 1968), chess player
- Lee-Roy Echteld (born 1968), football player and manager
- Won Yip (born 1969), businessman and media personality
- Roland Duong (born 1970), television program creator
- Mei Li Vos (born 1970), politician and trade unionist
- Li Jiao (born 1973), table tennis player
- Etienne Shew-Atjon (born 1974), football player
- Katja Schuurman (born 1975), singer, actress, and television presenter
- Jennifer de Jong (born 1976), model and actress
- Yao Jie (born 1977), badminton player
- Birgit Schuurman (born 1977), singer and actress
- Wei Ji Ma (born 1978), theoretical physicist and neuroscientist
- Huidji See (born 1981), pool and billiards player
- Eric Pang (born 1982), badminton player
- Ho-Pin Tung (born 1982), racing driver
- Cerezo Fung a Wing (born 1983), football player
- Li Jie (born 1984), table tennis player
- Calvin Jong-a-Pin (born 1986), football player
- Evita Tjon A Ten (born 1986), visual artist and singer
- Sjinkie Knegt (born 1989), short-track speed skater
- Diana Wang (born 1990), singer and actress
- Virgil van Dijk (born 1991), football player
- Eva Lim (born 1992), figure skater
- Yasmin Verheijen (born 1994), model and interior designer
- Martin Oei (born 1996), pianist
- Arianne Hartono (born 1996), tennis player
- Tahith Chong (born 1999), football player
- Wang Jingyu (born 2001), dissident and commentator
- Nathan Tjoe-A-On (born 2001), football player
- Daniel Au Yeong (born 2003), football player
- Kian Fitz-Jim (born 2003), football player
- Ryan Leijten (born 2003), football player

== See also ==
- Chinese Indonesians
  - Pao An Tui – Self-defense force of the Chinese-Indonesian community during the Indonesian Revolution
- Chinese Surinamese
- China–Netherlands relations
- Netherlands–Taiwan relations
- Qingtianese diaspora
