= Burgenland corpses discovery =

2015 death of 71 migrants in a lorry in Austria

- Date: August 2015
- Location: Ost Autobahn in Burgenland, Austria; 48.0032585°N 16.8317331°E
- Deaths: 71
- Arrests: At least 14
- Convicted: 14
- Charges: Four counts of homicide Ten counts of belonging to a criminal smuggling organisation

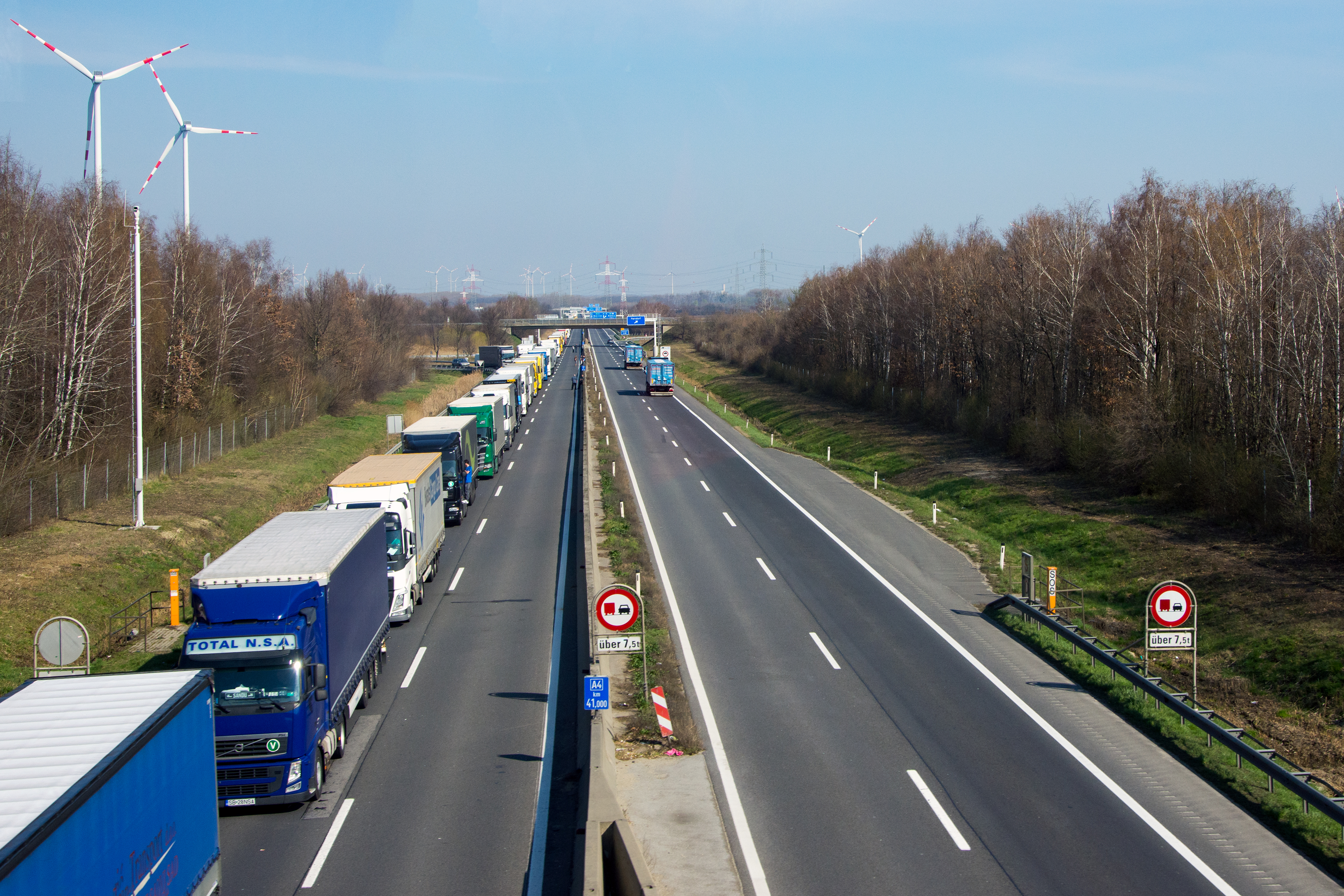
A4 Ost Autobahn

On 27 August 2015, the bodies of 71 refugees were discovered in a lorry on the Ost Autobahn in Burgenland, Austria. The victims were part of the wave of many thousands of migrants who travelled through the western Balkans in an effort to reach Germany. The borders were opened shortly afterward to allow the influx across.

== Vehicle ==
The lorry involved in the incident, a Volvo FL 180, belonged to the Hungarian firm of Mastermobiliker Ltd, which had been under bankruptcy proceedings since July 2014. The lorry also bore the logo of a previous owner, the Slovak livestock company Hyza. The lorry bore Hungarian number plates, which officials stated had been registered to the vehicle by a Romanian citizen.

The vehicle – a two-axle Class C1 (7.5 tonne GVWR) lorry with a refrigerated box body – had been parked in an emergency bay on the A4 east autobahn between Neusiedl am See and Parndorf, about one kilometer after the Neusiedl exit, in the direction of Vienna. A witness stated that he had already seen the vehicle stopped in the emergency bay at around 9:45 a.m. on the morning of August 26. A man fled the scene by car.

On the morning of 27 August 2015, the truck was discovered by an employee of the state road construction company ASFINAG while mowing, who then alerted the police. The cab was unlocked and empty.

== Incident ==
The lorry had begun its journey in Budapest. It departed Röszke early on Wednesday 25 August, and reached the Hungary-Austria border by 09:00. Crossing into Austria the following night, the vehicle was spotted by police at around 05:00 or 06:00 on Thursday morning. During the first 80 minutes of the journey, the driver heard the victims calling for help. He continued to drive, covering over 350 km (220 miles) of the 850 km (530 miles) planned journey to Germany. He then panicked and abandoned the lorry, leaving it parked on the road. The vehicle was discovered between Neusiedl and Parndorf after the driver had abandoned the vehicle. During grass mowing, blood and other fluids were seen to be dripping from the doors, accompanied by a stench. Officers opened the back of the vehicle at 11:40 that same morning.

The back door of the lorry was not locked, but had been securely closed with wires, and the refrigeration system showed no signs of having been switched on. There were no vents to allow fresh air to reach the victims. There were no survivors.

== Victims ==
A total of 59 men, eight women, and four children perished, of whom 29 were from Iraq, 21 from Afghanistan, 15 from Syria, and the other six of unknown origin. Death was by suffocation. All but 13 of the bodies were returned to their families; the remainder were buried in Liesing, Vienna, at a Muslim cemetery.

Due to the advanced state of decomposition of the bodies, caused by the high temperature within the vehicle, identification required forensic assistance, including the analysis of mobile phones and the contents of bags found among the corpses. Some victims were identified after concerned family members who had lost contact with loved ones reached out to authorities, providing genetic samples for testing.

== Investigation and litigation ==
Initially Hungarian police told reporters that they had arrested four men and questioned more than 20 others. Three of the arrested men were Bulgarian and the other an Afghan citizen, including the vehicles purported owner and two of its drivers.

In 2018, the group of smugglers responsible for the deaths were prosecuted in a Hungarian court. Four were found guilty of homicide and sentenced to 25 years in prison. Another ten were convicted on charges of belonging to a criminal smuggling organisation and were all given sentences ranging from three to twelve years.

== Response ==
German Chancellor Angela Merkel spoke about the incident to journalists while in Vienna attending the Western Balkan Nations on Europe's Refugee Crisis summit, to discuss topics including the refugee crisis. Merkel stated that she was shaken by the news, and the incident was a warning for leaders to tackle the issue of migration quickly.

Austrian Foreign Minister Johanna Mikl-Leitner and Austrian Chancellor Werner Faymann also spoke out about the incident, affirming that human smugglers are criminals and that the refugees had attempted to escape but were killed at the smugglers' hands.

Amnesty International spoke out against the events and called on European leaders and citizens to show solidarity to refugees.

== See also ==
- 2000 Dover incident
- 2022 San Antonio trailer deaths
- Essex lorry deaths
- Mozambique people smuggling disaster
- Ranong human-smuggling incident
- List of migrant vehicle incidents in Europe
