= Holland Village =

Holland Village (or Holland V) can refer to

== Places ==
- Holland Village, Singapore
- Holland Village in Gaoqiao, Shanghai, People's Republic of China
- Holland Village in Shenyang, People's Republic of China, a development project of businessman Yang Bin

== Transportation ==
- Holland Village MRT station on the Circle MRT line in Singapore's Mass Rapid Transit
- USS Plunger (1895), also known as Holland V

== Arts and Entertainment ==
- Holland V (TV series), a Singapore Chinese drama serial
