= Calvin Jong-a-Pin =

Dutch footballer (born 1986)

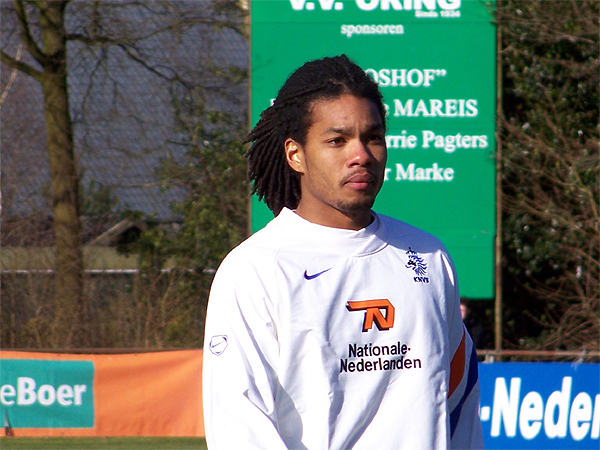
- Jong-a-Pin in 2008

Personal information
- Full name: Calvin Jong-a-Pin
- Date of birth: 18 July 1986 (age 40)
- Place of birth: Amsterdam, Netherlands
- Height: 1.83 m (6 ft 0 in)
- Position: Centre-back

Youth career
- Fortius
- Zeeburgia

Senior career*
Years	Team	Apps	(Gls)
2005–2006	Volendam	6	(1)
2006–2011	Heerenveen	73	(0)
2009–2010	→ Vitesse Arnhem (loan)	30	(0)
2011–2015	Shimizu S-Pulse	93	(1)
2016	FC Machida Zelvia	33	(1)
2017–2021	Yokohama FC	120	(3)
2021	FC Gifu	1	(0)
Total		356	(6)

International career^{‡}
2007–2008	Netherlands U21	10	(0)
2008	Netherlands Olympic	3	(0)
Medal record
Men's football
Representing Netherlands
UEFA European Under-21 Championship
Winner	2007 Netherlands
- * Club domestic league appearances and goals as of 14:36, 17 February 2023 (UTC) ‡ National team caps and goals as of 21 June 2008

Calvin Jong-a-Pin (born 18 July 1986) is a Dutch former professional footballer who played as a defender.

Primarily considered a central defender, Jong-a-Pin has proved extremely versatile and has been deployed as a left back and a defensive midfielder at various spells in his career.

== Club career ==
=== Early career ===
Jong-a-Pin was born in Amsterdam and started his professional career at FC Volendam. He made his debut for Volendam against N.E.C. He scored his first goal for Volendam the following match.

=== Heerenveen ===
In 2006 Jong-a-Pin signed a five-year deal with Heerenveen. He made his debut against FC Groningen being the youngest starting player at the age of 19 in the match. In his first season he was backup to Kristian Bak Nielsen as left-back. In the 2007–08 season, Jong-a-Pin became a regular due to the departure of Nielsen playing 23 matches in the Eredivisie. Due to his impressive performances in 2007, he was selected by Foppe de Haan in the 18-man squad to participate in the 2008 Summer Olympics for Netherlands, playing in three matches in the tournament. In 2009 Jong-a-Pin joined Vitesse Arnhem on loan. After a very impressive season with Vitesse playing 30 matches scoring one goal, Heerenveen were convinced he was going to return as a starter in the Heerenveen line-up. Jong-a-Pin returned and was played as starting left-back in the 2010–11 season and played 29 matches for Heerenveen.

=== Vitesse (loan) ===
In 2009 Jong-a-Pin joined Vitesse on a one-year loan. He made his debut for Vitesse against FC Utrecht. He scored his first goal for Vitesse against RKC Waalwijk and scored the only goal of the match. He was a starting player in the Vitesse line-up and played 30 matches scoring 1 goal.

=== Japan ===
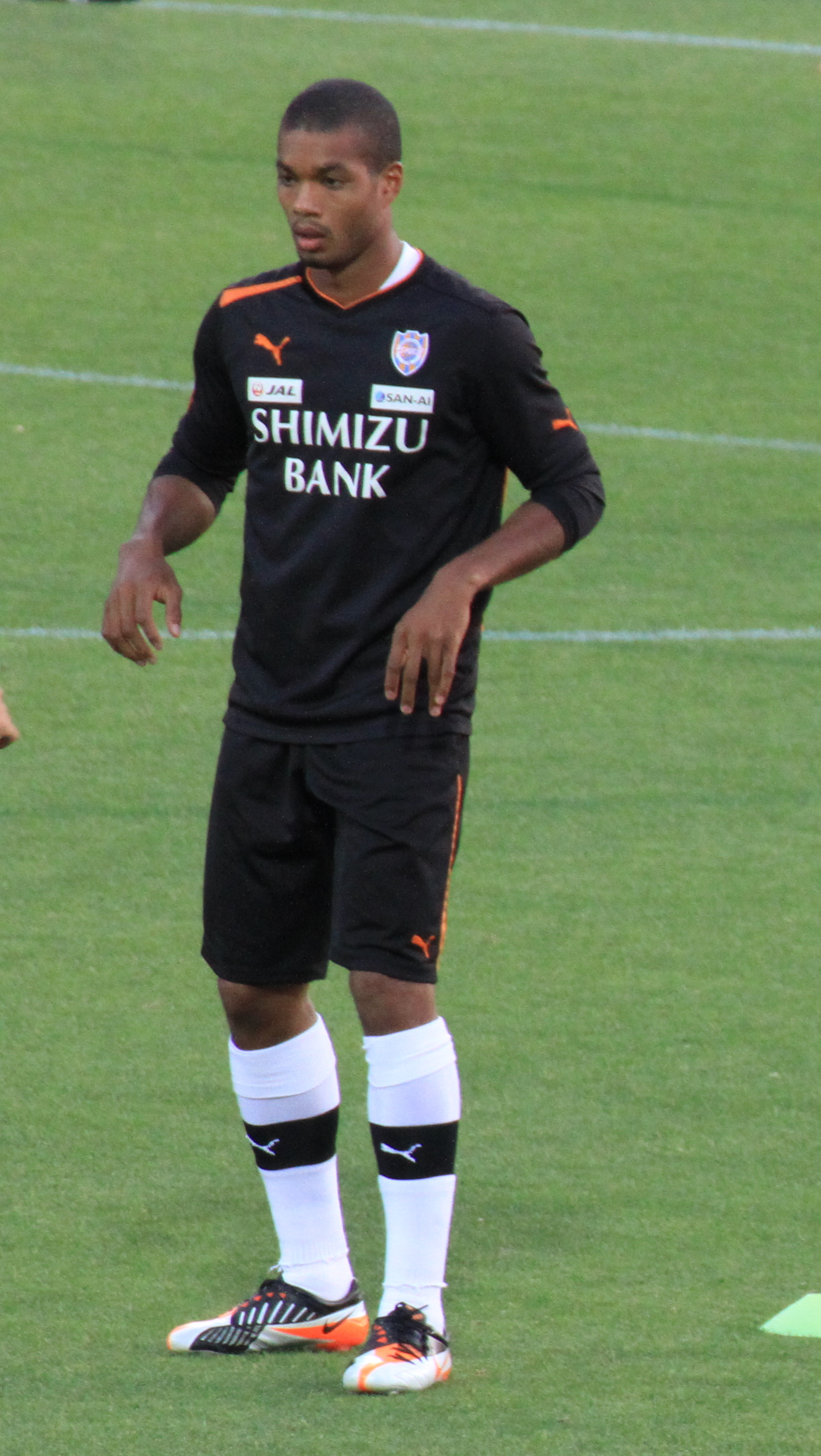
Jong-a-Pin with Shimizu in 2012

On 17 August 2011, Jong-a-Pin moved to Japan, signing a contract with J1 League side Shimizu S-Pulse. Following Shinji Ono's departure in October 2012, he was appointed the new vice captain.

On 21 February 2016, Jong-a-Pin signed for J2 League side FC Machida Zelvia, arriving on a free transfer. On 6 January 2017, Yokohama FC announced the new signing of Calvin Jong-a-pin . On 21 July, Calvin Jong-a-pin posted a video on his Instagram that Yokohama FC will not extend his contract and will be a free agent on 1 August and now till this day he's still without a club.

== International career ==
In 2007 Jong-a-Pin was called up by Jong Oranje coach Foppe de Haan to be part of his squad for the 2007 UEFA European Under-21 Football Championship held in the Netherlands. Jong-a-Pin participated in both of their first round group matches against Israel (1–0 win) and Portugal (2–1 win) to secure a semi final spot and to qualify for the 2008 Summer Olympics. Later the final was reached with a 1–1, 13–12 win after a penalty shootout with 32 penalty kicks taken against England. The Dutch went on to retain their 2006 title by beating Serbia 4–1 in the final. Jong-a-Pin played 3 games in the 2008 Summer Olympics, which occurred in his ancestral country China.

== Personal life ==
His family is from Suriname, with some Chinese ancestry from his father's side.

== Career statistics ==
As of end of the 2021 season.

Club	Season	League			National Cup (Note: Appearances in the KNVB Cup and Emperor's Cup)		League Cup (Note: Appearances in the J.League Cup)		Continental (Note: Appearances in the UEFA Cup)		Other		Total	
Club	Season	Division	Apps	Goals	Apps	Goals	Apps	Goals	Apps	Goals	Apps	Goals	Apps	Goals
Volendam	2005–06	Eerste Divisie	6	1	0	0	–		–		–		6	1
Heerenveen	2006–07	Eredivisie	9	0	0	0	–		–		1 (Note: Appearance in Eredivisie UEFA competition play-offs)	0	10	0
Heerenveen	2007–08	Eredivisie	19	0	0	0	–		–		4 (Note: Appearances in Eredivisie UEFA competition play-offs)	0	23	0
Heerenveen	2008–09	Eredivisie	16	0	1	0	–		4	0	–		21	0
Heerenveen	2010–11	Eredivisie	29	0	2	0	–		–		–		31	0
Heerenveen	Total		73	0	3	0	0	0	4	0	5	0	85	0
Vitesse (loan)	2009–10	Eredivisie	30	0	1	0	–		0	0	–		31	0
Shimizu S-Pulse	2011	J1 League	11	0	2	0	3	0	0	0	–		16	0
Shimizu S-Pulse	2012	J1 League	32	0	3	0	11	0	0	0	–		46	0
Shimizu S-Pulse	2013	J1 League	26	1	3	0	4	0	0	0	–		33	1
Shimizu S-Pulse	2014	J1 League	15	0	0	0	6	0	0	0	–		21	0
Shimizu S-Pulse	2015	J1 League	9	0	0	0	0	0	0	0	–		9	0
Shimizu S-Pulse	Total		93	1	8	0	24	0	0	0	0	0	125	1
Machida Zelvia	2016	J2 League	33	1	1	0	–		0	0	–		34	1
Yokohama FC	2017	J2 League	38	1	0	0	–		–		–		38	1
Yokohama FC	2018	J2 League	34	2	0	0	–		–		–		34	2
Yokohama FC	2019	J2 League	42	0	0	0	–		–		–		42	0
Yokohama FC	2020	J1 League	5	0	0	0	1	0	–		–		6	0
Yokohama FC	2021	J1 League	1	0	1	0	0	0	–		–		2	0
Yokohama FC	Total		120	3	1	0	1	0	0	0	0	0	122	3
FC Gifu	2021	J3 League	1	0	0	0	–		–		–		1	0
Career total			356	6	14	0	25	0	4	0	5	0	404	6

== Honours ==
- KNVB Cup: 2009
- UEFA European Under-21 Championship: 2007
