= List of migrant vehicle incidents in Europe =

This list of illegal migrant vehicle incidents in Europe includes those that involved injury and/or loss of life.

== List ==
Date	Location	Passengers	Injuries	Deaths	Description
18 June 2000	Dover, Kent, United Kingdom	60	2	58	58 Chinese illegal migrants were found dead in the back of a Dutch-registered lorry. Main article: Dover lorry deaths
8 December 2001	Drinagh, Wexford, Ireland	13	5	8	The victims were found in a business park in an intermodal container carrying furniture from Italy. They entered the container the night of December 3–4 at a truck stop in Groot-Bijgaarden, Belgium. The plan was for a three-hour voyage from Zeebrugge to Dover rather than a 102-hour voyage in stormy weather to Belview Harbour at Waterford. The dead were all Turks, including four children; the survivors were Turkish, Algerian, and Kosovo Albanian. In 2003 a Belgian court sentenced a London-based Turk and six Belgium-based Kosovars and Moroccans to between two and ten years' imprisonment, the longest in absentia.
17 August 2003	Poole, Dorset, UK	3	0	1	Iraqi Kurdish illegal migrant found dead and two arrested when police stopped a lorry. The dead man had been crushed by the movement of metal containers.
5 October 2005	Haddon, Peterborough, Cambridgeshire, UK	6	0	1	Vietnamese illegal migrant jumped or fell from lorry and died. Police arrested five others, all believed to be Vietnamese.
11 May 2006	A3 near Clanfield, Hampshire, UK	1	0	1	Clung under lorry then fell and crushed by it.
November 2006	Harlow, Essex, UK	1	0	1	Tied himself under lorry; went under wheels after cutting free
June 2007	A43 nr Chambery, France	4	3	1	Hiding in speedboat in transit from Greece to Devon
September 2008	Trent Vale, Staffordshire, UK	1	0	1	At third attempt to enter UK (established from fingerprints of the deceased), run over by lorry
2 December 2008	M3, Winchester, Hampshire, UK	2	0	1	Hand seen protruding from lorry; upon the lorry being stopped, another man ran off
31 October 2009	Eurotunnel Calais Terminal, France	1	0	1	Found dead in hidden compartment in lorry at Tunnel Terminal
11 April 2010	Dunkirk ferry terminal, France	1	0	1	Fell from lorry boarding ferry
21 August 2015	Amstetten, Lower Austria, Austria	30	24	0	24 illegal migrants were injured (3 seriously) when the truck they were travelling in overturned. There were 30 migrants in the vehicle at the time.
24 August 2015	Nickelsdorf, Burgenland, Austria	70–90	37	0	37 illegal migrants were injured in an accident. There were between 70 and 90 migrants in the two trucks involved.
27 August 2015	Ost Autobahn, Burgenland, Austria	71	0	71	Police discovered a truck along the A4 highway and found 71 deceased illegal migrants, including eight children. The truck, which had been parked on the hard shoulder in between the villages of Neusiedl and Parndorf, had been noticed by an employee of the ASFiNAG highway agency who observed liquid seeping out and informed police. All migrants had suffocated within hours of boarding. The driver claimed he did not know how to keep the doors partially shut, in a way that air could seep in. It is not clear when he became aware that the migrants were deceased. In June 2018, the driver and three others were given 25-year sentences on homicide charges. They stated that they regretted what had happened and had not wanted the victims to die. Main article: Burgenland corpses discovery
29 September 2015	Calais, Hauts-de-France, France	3	0	1	An Iraqi illegal migrant was found crushed to death attempting to reach the UK illegally with the help of a Hungarian lorry driver near Calais when he inspected his cargo after "braking for reasons unknown". Two other relatives were found uninjured.
23 March 2016	Canterbury, Kent, UK	26	2	0	A woman collapsed and was taken to hospital while a boy suffered a leg injury after 26 illegal migrants were found in the back of a Romanian-registered refrigerated lorry. The lorry had been travelling to the UK from Spain.
3 March 2016	Calais, Hauts-de-France, France	0	1	0	Mick Young, a lorry driver from Essex, was violently assaulted by a group of migrants angered by the recent demolition of the Calais migrant camp. The migrants forced Young to stop, then attacked him with sticks, rocks, metal bars and lumps of concrete, leaving him with cuts to his forehead and a wound to his eye which required medical attention.
21 May 2016	Portsmouth, Hampshire, UK	28	1	0	One man required urgent medical attention for inhalation of hazardous fumes and several others received medical attention after 28 illegal migrants were found in the back of a refrigerated lorry.
18 October 2016	Ashford, Kent, UK	1	0	1	An Eritrean man was found dead when a Hungarian-registered lorry stopped at a cafe. French authorities had checked the vehicle in Calais, removing 'around 10' migrants from Eritrea from the lorry.
20 June 2017	A16 autoroute near Guemps, Hauts-de-France, France	0	0	1	A Polish van driver was killed after his vehicle slammed into the back of an articulated lorry stopped by a group of Eritrean illegal migrants, who had blocked the A16 autoroute with tree limbs to break into vehicles. The vehicle exploded upon impact, killing the driver instantly. Nine migrants were arrested.
25 July 2017	A16 autoroute near Calais, Hauts-de-France, France	0	1	0	An HGV driver was left hospitalised with severe injuries after being beaten over the head with a brick by a group of illegal migrants who had stopped his truck; the migrants then hijacked the driver's vehicle and drove it towards the port, but were apprehended by police.
29 December 2017	Calais, Hauts-de-France, France	1	0	1	An Eritrean illegal migrant was crushed to death after the truck in which he was stowed away under a several-tonne pile of paper rolls crashed.
17 November 2018	Brussels-North railway station, Brussels, Belgium	1	0	1	A Chadian illegal migrant was crushed to death under coach when it started moving. The incident was not discovered until a routine check at Folkestone.
22 May 2019	Vojvodina, Serbia	4	2	2	Two illegal migrants died of heatstroke and suffocation and two others were in serious condition after hiding in a tanker truck near the border with Hungary. The driver discovered them when he opened the tank and saw them lying unconscious. At least two of the migrants were from Afghanistan.
6 July 2019	A29 Highway, Netherlands	8	0	1	An illegal migrant died after a fall or jump from a Romanian truck onto a highway in South Holland. All the migrants were presumably from Eritrea.
25 August 2019	Slovenian–Croatian border	12	0	1	A woman died after a truck carrying 12 illegal migrants fell into a river after the driver fled a checkpoint near the border. The migrants were from Egypt and Pakistan.
26 August 2019	Alexandroupolis, Greece	16	10	6	Six illegal migrants were killed and another 10 injured when a smuggling jeep carrying them through northern Greece crashed into an irrigation ditch.
23 October 2019	Grays, Essex, United Kingdom	39	0	39	Ambulance crews found 39 Vietnamese people dead inside a lorry trailer. Main article: Essex lorry deaths
21 December 2021	Beuvrequen, Pas-de-Calais, France	0	0	1	A Portuguese lorry driver suffered a fatal heart attack after a group of migrants stopped his vehicle, then punched him in the head when he left the cab and attempted to stop them from hijacking it.
17 February 2023	Lokorsko, Sofia City Province, Bulgaria	52	34	18	At least 18 migrants were found dead due to suffocation near Sofia.
13 October 2023	Ampfing, Bavaria, Germany	23	16	7	Seven people, including a child, were killed after a minivan driven by a suspected people-smuggler overturned on the A94 motorway while trying to evade police. Main article: Mühldorf van crash

== See also ==
- Timeline of the 2015 European migrant crisis
- List of migrant vessel incidents on the Mediterranean Sea
