= Smuggled (TV series) =

- Genre: Reality television
- Country of origin: United Kingdom
- No. of episodes: 2

Production
- Executive producer: Ed Kellie
- Producer: David Modell
- Production company: ScreenDog

Original release
- Network: Channel 4
- Release: 4 November – 11 November 2019

Smuggled is a British reality television documentary miniseries shown on Channel 4.

The documentary follows eight British nationals as they attempt to smuggle themselves into Britain, testing the border security. The producer, David Modell, called the UK's border security an "illusion".

The show was originally scheduled to begin airing on 28 October 2019, but was postponed by a week to 4 November after 39 people were found dead in a refrigerated lorry in Essex. The victims, all Vietnamese, had been illegally smuggled into the UK. The Home Office criticised Channel 4 for being 'insensitive and irresponsible' to show it too soon. Alice Jones of the i newspaper was also critical of the brief postponement, claiming that it was put off "only by seven days, because we’ll all be able to see the fun side of trafficking by then, presumably."

== Reception ==
Gerard O'Donovan of The Daily Telegraph rated the show three stars out of five, saying "The central idea – smuggling British people back into Britain – was flawed to say the least and left the programme devoid of the threat and motivation that makes real illegal immigrants risk everything to get into Britain." Kasia Delgado from the i allotted the documentary one star out of five; considering it a "trite, simplistic look at a problem which deserved more nuance and respect".

In The Guardian, Mark Lawson was more positive, writing that "Tense and revelatory, the show hid important reportage beneath its flashy chassis."
