= Dover lorry deaths =

Illegal immigration incident resulting in the deaths of 58 people

Coordinates: 51°7′15.3″N 1°18′47.2″E

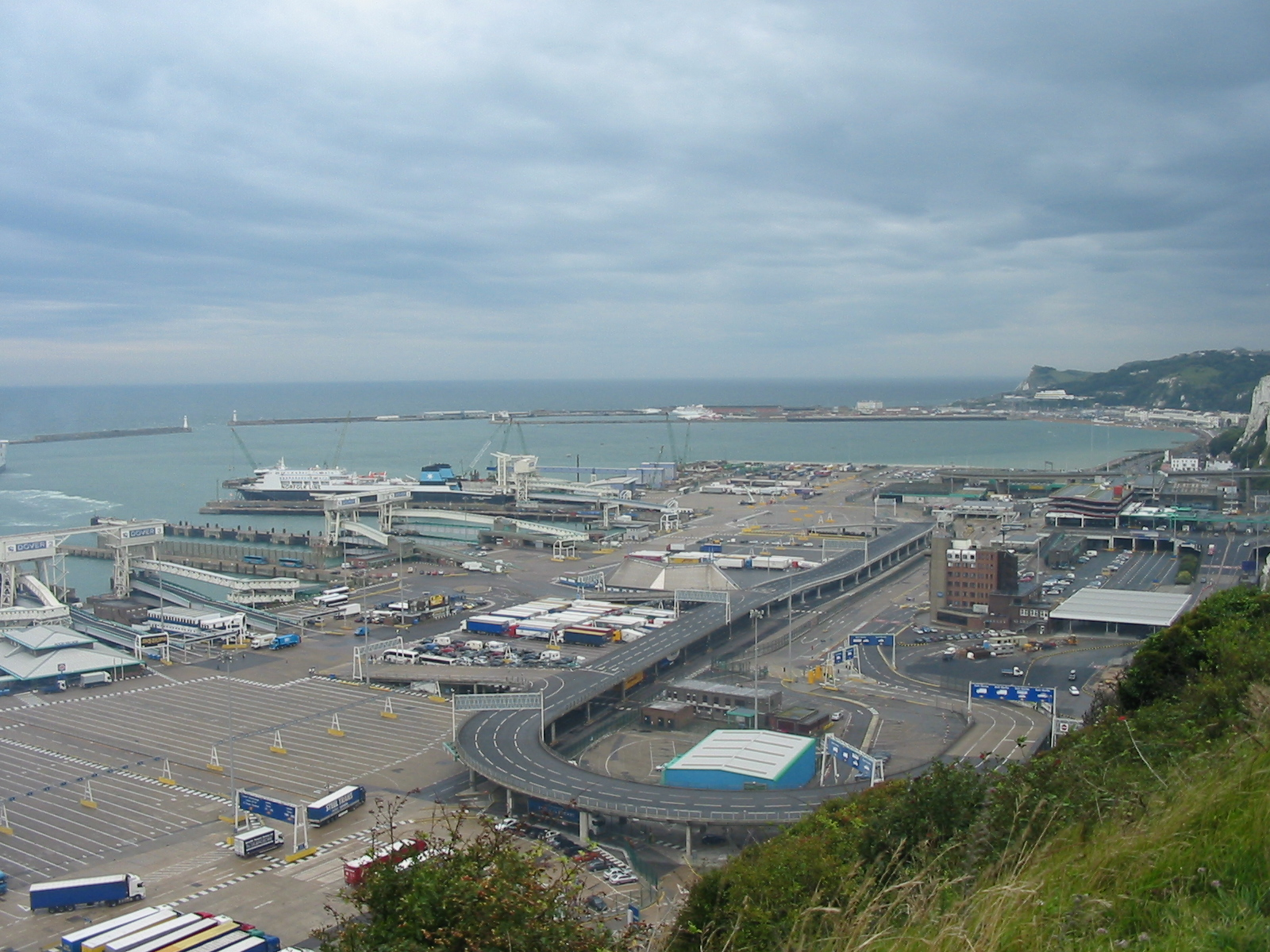
- The Port of Dover in 2004
- Date: 18 June 2000
- Location: Dover, Kent, United Kingdom
- Perpetrator: Perry Wacker
- Deaths: 58
- Injuries: 2

On 18 June 2000, just before midnight, 58 dead bodies were found in a lorry in the port town of Dover, United Kingdom. Two people were found alive but injured and taken to hospital.

== Incident ==
The Dutch lorry came from a ferry that had arrived from Zeebrugge in Belgium. It was selected for examination by officers from HM Customs & Excise who then called the police and ambulance service. It was determined that the deceased were illegal immigrants, and likely died of asphyxiation, though carbon monoxide poisoning was not ruled out. The 60 people were trapped in the container for more than 18 hours, when the outside temperature reached 32 °C (90 °F). The survivors were found closest to the doors.

== Casualties ==
It was confirmed by police that all the deceased were Chinese immigrants, 54 men and 4 women. The incident was one of the largest mass killings in British criminal history, and the largest involving illegal immigrants entering the United Kingdom, the second being Essex lorry deaths, where all 39 Vietnamese immigrants were found dead in a truck in Essex. The 60 Chinese had paid £20,000 each. They were flown from Beijing to Belgrade, then driven to Zeebrugge.

== Investigation and prosecution ==
The trailer was owned by a newly formed Dutch haulage company, 'Van Der Spek Transporten', which had been registered days before the incident. A similarly named, legitimate, Dutch haulage company was not involved. The driver of the lorry was Perry Wacker, 33, of Rotterdam. Wacker was arrested at the scene and, in 2001, was sentenced to 14 years in prison for manslaughter for his part in an organised people smuggling operation, coordinated by a Chinese snakehead gang. He was also found guilty of conspiracy to facilitate the entry of irregular immigrants.

In 2003, nine Chinese gang members were jailed in the Netherlands for their part in the tragedy.

== Survivors ==
The two survivors were initially hospitalised with extreme dehydration; they were subsequently given conditional leave to remain in Britain for four years.

== See also ==
- 2004 Morecambe Bay cockling disaster
- Burgenland corpses discovery
- Essex lorry deaths
- Mozambique people smuggling disaster
- Ranong human-smuggling incident
- 2022 San Antonio migrant deaths
- List of migrant vehicle incidents in Europe
