= Chinatown, The Hague =

Coordinates: 52.0761°N 4.3137°E

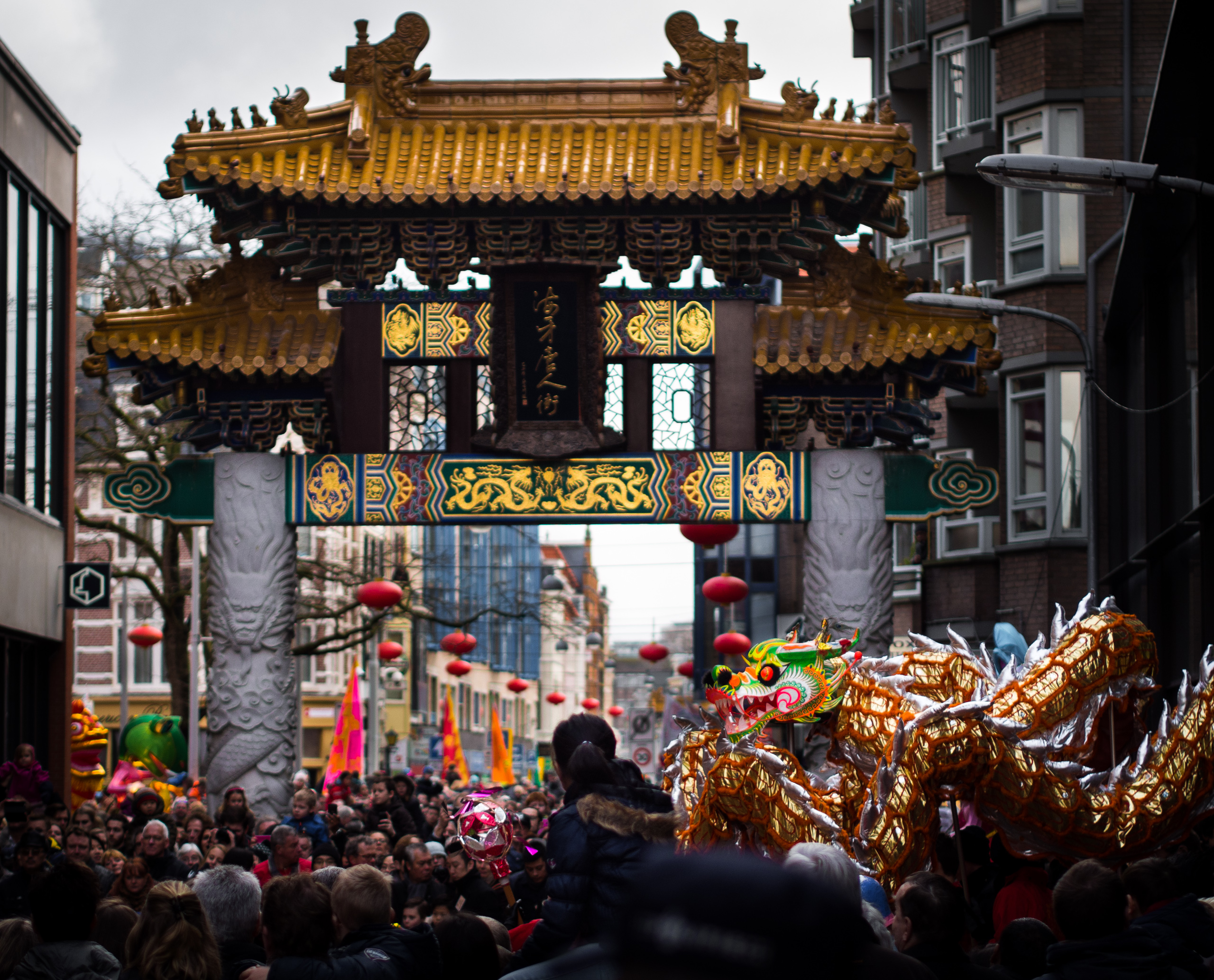
- One of the two Chinese gates during the Chinese New Year celebration of 2015

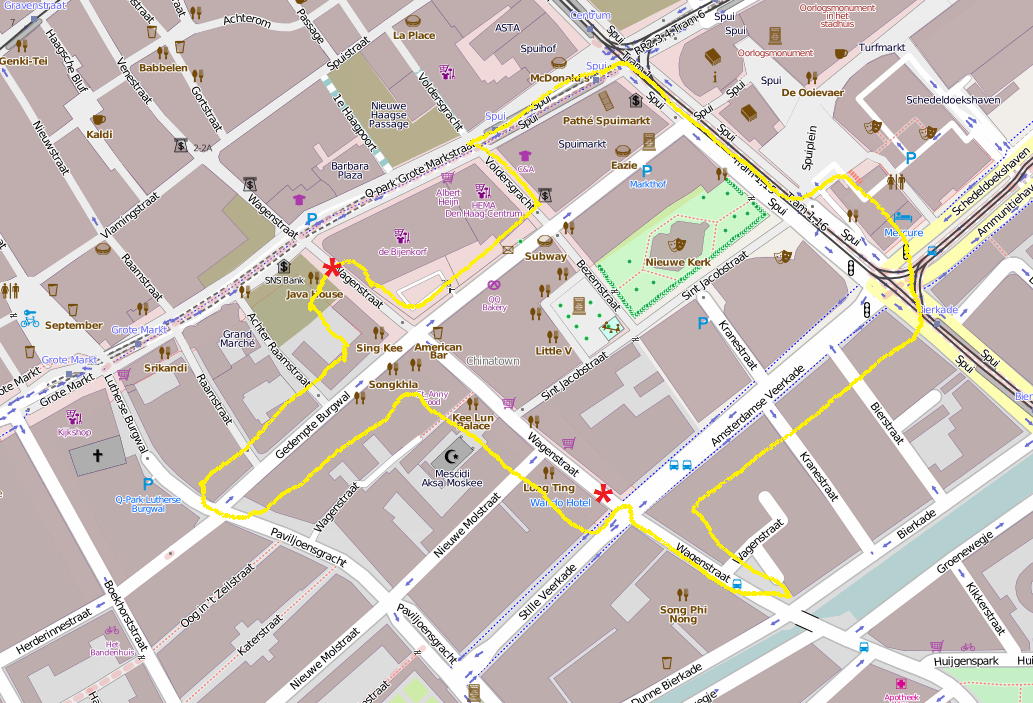
- Location of Chinatown in The Hague
- Chinese: 海牙唐人街
- Literal meaning: The Hague's Chinatown
Transcriptions

The Hague's Chinatown is located in the city centre, on the Wagenstraat. The entrances of the neighbourhood are marked with two Chinese gates, described as "three meters high with sculptured dragons winding around the pillars and overhead ornate panels of red, gold and blue." Chinatown borders the Spui in the north east, the Bierkade in the south east, the Pavilioensgracht in the south west, and the Gedempte Burgwal in the north west. Important streets in the area include the Wagenstraat (車仔街) and the Sint Jacobsstraat (聖雅各街).

The area was originally a Jewish quarter. After the Second World War, the neighbourhood grew vacant and impoverished. After a revamp by the municipality in the 1970s, the area became increasingly inhabited by Chinese people. Today, the city government of The Hague actively promotes diversity when compared to another Dutch city of Amsterdam and has claimed that "ethnic tourism" has risen in the city. Another source claims that The Hague's Chinatown is "... an attempt to draw together the Dutch and Chinese identities at work in the area."

== See also ==
- Chinese people in the Netherlands
