= Ranong human-smuggling incident =

2008 deaths of 54 people in a seafood container in Thailand

- Date: April 8, 2008
- Location: Ranong, Thailand
- Cause: Human smuggling
- First reporter: Royal Thai Police
- Deaths: 54

The Ranong human-smuggling incident was a human smuggling disaster in Ranong, Thailand in April 2008. 54 people suffocated to death in a seafood container while being smuggled from Myanmar to Phuket, Thailand.

== Incident ==
On the night of 9 April 2008, 121 Burmese workers were transported illegally by fishing boat from Song Island in Myanmar to a landing near Ranong, Thailand. All were illegal migrant workers seeking transport to Phuket, where they planned to seek jobs as day laborers. Each had paid smugglers 6,000 baht (US$190) or 10,000 baht (US$316) for the journey. All 121 people were herded into an airtight seafood refrigeration unit on the back of a truck. It measured 6 metres by 2.2 metres (20 feet by 7 feet), meaning standing room only for the passengers.

Thirty minutes into the journey, conditions in the container became stifling. The workers banged on the sides of the container to alert the driver, but he failed to stop and warned everyone to remain quiet so as to avoid alerting the Thai Police as they passed through checkpoints. He turned on the air conditioning, but it failed after a few minutes. When the driver finally stopped on a quiet road running along the Andaman Sea 90 minutes later, many, mostly women, had already collapsed. After seeing the bodies, the driver fled.

The dead were 36 women, an 8-year-old girl, and 17 men.

== Aftermath ==
Families received 35,000 baht compensation for each relative who died, Suwanna Suwanjutha, director-general of the Rights and Liberties Protection Department, announced in July 2008. On 28 December 2012 four Thais found guilty of human smuggling were sentenced to between three and ten years imprisonment for their involvement. The four were convicted of gross negligence resulting in death and of breaking immigration laws.

The truck owner, Damrong "Run" Phussadee, of Rungruengsup Ltd, was sentenced to 10 years for his involvement. Jirawat "Ko-Chun" Sopapanwaraku, who owned Choke Jaroen Pier where the migrants arrived by boat, was jailed for six years. Chalhermchai "Joe" Waritjanpleng was sentenced to nine years in prison. Ms Panchalee "Pueng" Chusung's six-year sentence was halved after she confessed. "Three of them were granted bail of between US$13,000 [about 400,000 baht] and US$6,500 [about 200,000 baht] while they file appeals", the official said, adding that the fourth defendant was held in custody after failing to meet bail terms. The truck driver, Suchon Bunplong, fled the scene, but was later arrested and then confessed to his involvement. He was sentenced to 12 years in prison in 2008, but his confession to trafficking illegal immigrants saw that jail term being halved to six years, Maj Gen Apirak Hongthong, Phuket Police Commander at the time, told the Phuket Gazette in June 2008.

== See also ==
- 2000 Dover incident
- Burgenland corpses discovery
- Essex lorry deaths
- Mozambique people smuggling disaster
