= Sinŭiju Special Administrative Region =

Former planned SAR in North Korea

Coordinates: 40°06′02″N 124°23′37″E

- Flag Seal

- (1) Map of Sinŭiju Special Administrative Region highlighted in red and (2) location of Sinŭiju within North Korea
- Country: North Korea
- Region: Kwansŏ

Government
  - Type: Special Administrative Region with its own Basic Law

Area
  - Total: 132 km^{2} (51 sq mi)

Population (1998 (est.))
  - Total: 349,500
  - Density: 2,650/km^{2} (6,860/sq mi)
- Dialect: P'yŏngan

Korean name
- Hangul: 신의주특별행정구
- Hanja: 新義州特別行政區
- RR: Sinuiju-teukbyeolhaengjeonggu
- MR: Sinŭiju-t'ŭkpyŏrhaengjŏnggu

Sinŭiju Special Administrative Region (Korean: 신의주특별행정구) was a planned special administrative region (SAR) of North Korea based in the city of Sinŭiju. Proclaimed in 2002, the SAR was envisioned to be directly governed, having been split off from North Pyongan Province, as is the case for "Directly Governed Cities" but has yet to be put into de facto operation.

Proposals for a special economic zone in Sinŭiju to introduce market economics were first proposed to Chinese-Dutch businessman Yang Bin in 2001, who was proposed to be the zone's director. Yang later accepted the proposal on several conditions; most importantly, rather than a SEZ, the proposed area would become a special administrative region, emulating China's special administrative regions (SARs) of Hong Kong and Macau. Under this proposal, the Sinŭiju SAR would have its own "Basic Law" (기본법; Kibonpŏp), passport, flag and seal, and have large autonomy in all areas except foreign policy and defense. Though reluctant, North Korean officials eventually acceded to Yang's proposals.

In 2002, the Presidium of the Supreme People's Assembly promulgated the Basic Law of the Sinŭiju SAR and appointed Yang Bin as its chief executive. However, before Yang assumed office, he was arrested by Chinese authorities and sentenced to 18 years in prison for tax evasion and other economic crimes. The project has been dormant since.

== History ==
In 2001, North Korean leader Kim Jong Il visited Shanghai, where Chinese officials attempted to impress him with China's reform and opening up. Impressed, Kim told Chinese leader Jiang Zemin that "From the time China started to implement the policy of openness and reform, it achieved a tremendous success, especially in Shanghai. This proves that this policy of the Communist Party of China is a correct one." He was interested by greenhouses, and considered them as a potential solution to North Korea's food shortages. He learned the name of their developer, the Chinese-Dutch businessman Yang Bin, and told his subordinates to create contacts with him.

Yang was willing to replicate his business in North Korea, and he and his colleagues travelled to Pyongyang and built a sample greenhouse. Kim Tong Gyu, a member of the Central Committee of the Workers' Party of Korea and the official in charge of negotiations with Yang, suggested to him on 21 January 2001 about a cooperation on a bigger project. He told Yang about the failed special economic zone in Rason in the 1980s, and said that North Korea was considering creating a new 27 km² zone in Sinŭiju, asking him whether he would want to be the zone's director. Yang told Kim he could not make this decision immediately, and Kim replied they were in no rush.

On his next visit to Pyongyang, Yang said he agreed in principle, but with several conditions. He asked for the zone to be enlarged from 27 km² to 82 km², meaning that the bridge that connects China to Sinŭiju would be included in the area as well. He additionally said that it should not be a special economic zone, but rather a special administrative region. He explained the difference by saying a SEZ simply has a special economic regime, while a SAR has autonomy in almost every area except defense and foreign policy. He said that China had two SARs, Hong Kong and Macau, which at that time were established just a few years ago, and were the most economically successful cities in China.

North Korean officials were reluctant, but Yang insisted by saying that foreign investors were already familiar with the SAR system. North Korean officials still wanted to call the area an SEZ, but Yang countered by saying the name was an important signal to foreigners. North Korean officials agreed, and Yang also negotiated that the new SAR would have its own Basic Law, published in open sources, its own passport, and its own flag and seal. The Basic Law was heavily modelled after Hong Kong's, drafted by prominent lawyers from Hong Kong and Macau, and stipulated that the SAR would last 50 years and would have its own legal system.

In 2002, the Presidium of the Supreme People's Assembly promulgated the Basic Law of the Sinŭiju SAR and appointed Yang Bin as its chief executive. It announced that 30 September 2002 was the date the law would come into force. Yang called on a press conference to talk about his plans. He announced that around 300,000 to 500,000 people of the city would have to resettle to the southern part of Sinŭiju, which was not part of the SAR, while the rest would stay and become residents of the SAR. Planning to demolish much of the city, Yang envisioned building a city similar to Shenzhen, with industrial zones and commercial, tourist and entertainment areas. He announced that the US dollar would become the SARs currency, and all foreigners would be granted visa-free access, including South Koreans. He announced that he was planning to appoint one to two South Koreans to the SARs Legislative Assembly.

However, the SAR or the proposed reforms did not come into effect by 30 September. Yang said that this was because North Korea was displeased with allowing South Koreans into Sinŭiju freely, which he said would be rectified by creating a "compatriot document", similar to the Mainland Travel Permit for Taiwan Residents. He said North Korea had not yet completed the fence which would separate the SAR from the rest of the country, which he told was another reason for the delay. Yang planned to move to the SAR permanently by late October. Before he formally assumed his post, he was arrested by Chinese authorities on 4 October and sentenced to 18 years in prison for tax evasion and other economic crimes. While the North Korean authorities soon announced that the development of the Sinŭiju SAR would continue and the SAR was put under the administration of its Commission of Foreign Economic Cooperation Promotion, the plans for the SAR were effectively abandoned.

As of April 2008, the SAR reforms still have not been put into effect, and it is possible that North Korea has abandoned the project after Yang's arrest. In September 2004, Chinese-American merchant Julie Sa (沙日香) was reported as a possible successor as chief executive. Between 2013 and 2018, a smaller Sinŭiju International Economic Zone was developed, backed by the state-owned Sinŭiju Zone Development Corporation. It hopes to develop high value projects such as software development, computer manufacturing and trade-related services.

== Area included in the Special Administrative Region ==
The order below follows the order given in the original decree.

=== Sinŭiju City ===
- Kwanmun-dong (관문동; 關門洞)
- Ponbu-dong (본부동; 本部洞)
- Sinwon-dong (신원동; 新元洞)
- Yŏkchŏn-dong (역전동; 驛前洞)
- Ch'ŏngsong-dong (청송동; 青松洞)
- Kŭnhwa-dong (근화동; 芹花洞)
- Paeksa-dong (백사동; 白沙洞)
- Paekun-dong (백운동; 白雲洞)
- Ch'aeha-dong (채하동; 彩霞洞)
- Oil-dong (오일동; 五一洞; aka "May 1-dong")
- Apkang-dong (압강동; 鴨江洞)
- Namsang-dong (남상동; 南上洞)
- Namsŏ-dong (남서동; 南西洞)
- Namjung-dong (남중동; 南中洞)
- Namha-dong (남하동; 南下洞)
- Kaehyŏk-dong (개혁동; 改革洞)
- Haebang-dong (해방동; 解放洞)
- P'yŏnghwa-dong (평화동; 平和洞)
- Minp'o-dong (민포동; 敏浦洞)
- Namsong-dong (남송도; 南松洞)
- Sinnam-dong (신남동; 新南洞)
- Sinp'o-dong (신포동; 新浦洞)
- Sumun-dong (수문동; 水門洞)
- Nammin-dong (남민동; 南敏洞)
- Tongha-dong (동하동; 東下洞)
- Tongjung-dong (동중동; 東中洞)
- Tongsang-dong (동상동; 東上洞)
- Ch'insŏn 1-dong (친선일동; 親善1洞)
- Ch'insŏn 2-dong (친선이동; 親善2洞)
- Pangjik-dong (방직동; 紡織洞)
- Majŏn-dong (마전동; 麻田洞)
- Hadan-ri (하단리; 下端里)
- Sangdan-ri (상단리; 上端里)
- Taji-ri (다지리; 多智里)
- Sŏngsŏ-ri (성서리; 城西里)
- Part of Sŏnsang-dong (선상동; 仙上洞)
- Part of Yŏnha-dong (연하동; 煙下洞)
- Part of Songhan-dong (송한동; 送瀚洞)
- Part of Ryusang 1-dong (류상일동; 柳上1洞)
- Part of Ryŏnsang 1-dong (련상일동; 蓮上1洞)
- Part of Paekt'u-dong (백투동; 白土洞)
- Part of T'osŏng-ri (토성리; 土城里)
- Part of Ryuch'o-ri (류초리; 柳草里)

=== Uiju County ===
- Sŏho-ri (서호리; 西湖里)
- Part of Hongnam-ri (홍남리; 弘南里)
- Part of Taesan-ri (대산리; 臺山里)

=== Yomju County ===
- Tasa-rodongjagu (다사로동자구; 多獅勞動者區; aka "Tasa workers' district")
- Part of Sŏkam-ri (석암리; 石岩里)

=== Cholsan County ===
- Part of Rihwa-ri (리화리; 梨花里)
- Part of Kŭmsan-ri (금산리; 錦山里)

Due to the areas included in the Special Administrative Region, it is not one single contiguous region, as to get from Sinŭiju city to Yomju County, one must pass through another county outside the region first.

== Transportation ==
The SAR is served by rail at the Sinŭiju Cheongnyeon Station. This station is a terminus station for trains from Pyongyang, capital of North Korea. Rail traffic from the station continues across the Sino–Korean Friendship Bridge over to China over the Yalu River. Public transport consists of trolleybuses.

== Economy ==
A few factories and shipyard exist in Sinŭiju, some producing consumer products for local use.

== See also ==
- Rason Special Economic Zone
- Kaesong Industrial Region
- Special economic zones of China
