= Yang Bin (footballer) =

Chinese association football player

Personal information
- Date of birth: 3 October 1991 (age 35)
- Height: 1.80 m (5 ft 11 in)
- Position: Midfielder

Team information
- Current team: Meizhou Hakka
- Number: 15

Youth career
- 2009–2011: Guangzhou Evergrande

Senior career*
Years	Team	Apps	(Gls)
2012–2014	Guangdong Sunray Cave		
2015–2018	Shenzhen Renren		
2019–	Meizhou Hakka	28	(6)
- * Club domestic league appearances and goals as of 14:01, 26 July 2021 (UTC)

Yang Bin (Chinese: 杨斌; born 3 October 1991) is a Chinese footballer currently playing as a midfielder for Meizhou Hakka.

== Career statistics ==
=== Club ===
As of 25 July 2021.

Club	Season	League			Cup		Continental		Other		Total	
Club	Season	Division	Apps	Goals	Apps	Goals	Apps	Goals	Apps	Goals	Apps	Goals
Guangdong Sunray Cave	2012	China League One	–		0	0	–		0	0	0	0
Guangdong Sunray Cave	2013	China League One	–		3 (Note: Appearances in the Chinese FA Cup)	1	–		0	0	3	1
Guangdong Sunray Cave	2014	China League One	13	0	1	0	–		0	0	14	0
Guangdong Sunray Cave	Total		13	0	4	1	0	0	0	0	17	1
Shenzhen Renren	2015	CFA Amateur League	–		0	0	–		0	0	0	0
Shenzhen Renren	2016	China League Two	17	2	1	1	–		2 (Note: Appearances in the China League Two playoffs)	1	20	4
Shenzhen Renren	2017	China League Two	21	5	1	0	–		5	1	27	6
Shenzhen Renren	2018	China League Two	24	2	1	0	–		2	0	27	2
Shenzhen Renren	Total		62	9	3	1	0	0	9	2	74	12
Meizhou Hakka	2019	China League One	23	6	1	0	–		0	0	24	6
Meizhou Hakka	2020	China League One	5	0	1	0	–		0	0	6	0
Meizhou Hakka	2021	China League One	0	0	0	0	–		0	0	8	0
Meizhou Hakka	Total		28	6	2	0	0	0	0	0	30	6
Career total			103	15	9	2	0	0	9	2	121	19
