= Wei Ji Ma =

Dutch Psychology and Neural Science professor and researcher (born in 1978)

- 马伟基
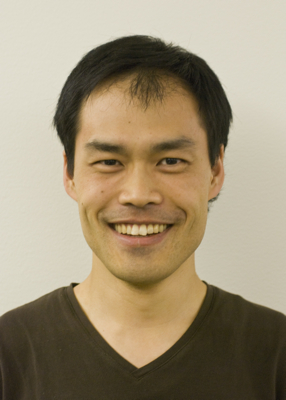
- Born: December 1978 (age 47); Delfzijl, the Netherlands
- Education: University of Groningen
- Title: Associate Professor
- Scientific career
- Fields: Neuroscience, psychology
- Workplaces: New York University

Wei Ji Ma (Dutch: Whee Ky Ma; Chinese: 马伟基; born December 1978) is a professor at New York University in the Department of Psychology and the Center for Neural Science. Ma focuses on the areas of perception, decision-making, and memory. He holds a PhD in theoretical physics from University of Groningen in the Netherlands. Ma is the 2021 recipient of the Jeffrey L. Elman Prize for Scientific Achievement and Community Building from the Cognitive Science Society.

== Biography ==
Ma was born in Delfzijl in December 1978 and grew up in Groningen, the Netherlands. He received a Bachelor of Science and Master of Science in physics in 1996 and a Bachelor of Science and Master of Science in mathematics in 1997, both from the University of Groningen. He continued at the University of Groningen, where he received a PhD in theoretical physics in 2000. He transitioned into computational neuroscience as a post-doctoral fellow under Christof Koch at the California Institute of Technology from 2002 to 2004, and subsequently as a post-doctoral fellow under Alexandre Pouget at the University of Rochester until 2008. He received his first faculty position in the Department of Neuroscience at Baylor College of Medicine in 2008 and remained there until 2013, when he took an associate professor position at New York University, where he has a dual appointment in the Center for Neural Science and the Department of Psychology.

== Research ==
Ma researches how the human brain represents and processes uncertainty. A large portion of his academic work is devoted to the construction of Bayesian inference models which describe how an observer arrives at beliefs about things in the world from noisy information. This modeling spans the range of describing the behavior of an observer, for example how an observer might infer two sensory inputs arise from a common source, to the activity of a population of neurons implementing the Bayesian operations. A complementary line of inquiry is studying encoding strategies in working memory, specifically highlighting the relationships between the role of noisy representations of objects in the brain and the number that can be recalled correctly. Broadly, his modeling focuses can be described as examining encoding models, decision rules, and probabilistic computations. In recent years, his work has focused on planning and thinking ahead in complex decision problems.

== Non-academic activities ==
Ma is a significant contributor in scientific outreach efforts. He is a founding member of the Scientist Action and Advocacy Network. In that capacity, he has been an expert witness, providing scientific testimony to the New York City Council Committees on Juvenile Justice & Courts and Legal Services on the issue of adolescent brain development. He is the co-founder and the current chairman of the board and CFO of the Rural China Education Foundation, whose goal is to improve the quality and efficacy of childhood education in order to improve the quality of life in rural communities in China. He was a neuroscience consultant for The Brain Piece, a dance interpretation of the brain and mind, and which has played in over 25 festivals and screenings globally. He was also a performer in The Brain Piece's trailer, Dance of the Neuron, which was selected for the 2017 In/Motion: Chicago's Dance Film Festival. He also created and co-organizes the Growing Up in Science talk series where he leads interviews and discussions on scientists’ personal maturation in academia. In addition to leading the series at NYU, he has brought it to scientific conferences and other universities.

== Bibliography ==
=== Selected publications ===
- Ma, W. J. (2012). Organizing probabilistic models of perception. Trends in Cognitive Sciences, 16(10), 511-518.
- Ma, W.J., Beck, J.M., Latham, P.E., & Pouget, A. (2006). Bayesian inference with probabilistic population codes. Nature Neuroscience, 9(11), 1432–1438.
- Ma, W. J., Husain, M., & Bays, P. M. (2014). Changing concepts of working memory. Nature Neuroscience, 17(3), 347-356.
- Ma, W. J., & Jazayeri, M. (2014). Neural coding of uncertainty and probability. Annual Review of Neuroscience, 37, 205-220.
- Ma, W. J., Navalpakkam, V., Beck, J. M., Berg, R. van den, & Pouget, A. (2011). Behavior and neural basis of near-optimal visual search. Nature Neuroscience, 14(6), 783-790.
- Wilken, P. & Ma, W.J. (2004). A detection theory account of change detection. Journal of Vision, 4(12), 1120–35.
