= Embassy of Vietnam, London =

Embassy of Vietnam in London
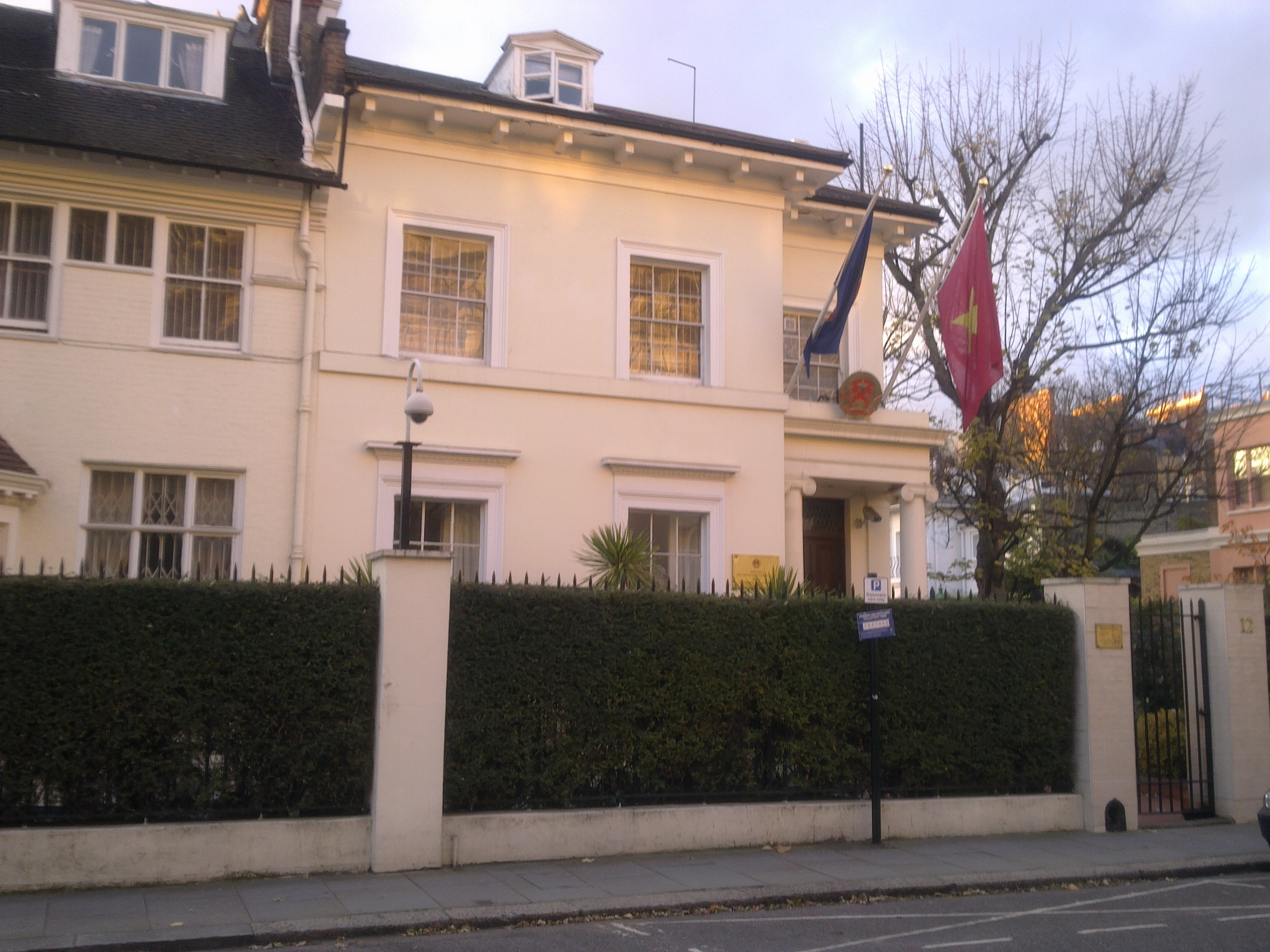
- Location: South Kensington, London
- Address: 12-14 Victoria Road, London, W8 5RD
- Coordinates: 51°30′0.9″N 0°11′10.9″W
- Ambassador: Nguyen Hoang Long

The Embassy of Vietnam in London is the diplomatic mission of Vietnam in the United Kingdom. Vietnam also maintains a Commercial Section at 108 Campden Hill Road, Holland Park. It was supposedly designed in 1959 by Ngo Viet Thu, a preeminent modernist architect of Vietnam.

== Incidents ==
In 1988, a diplomat from the embassy was expelled for waving a gun at protestors.

In 2000, a fire was started in the embassy building after a break-in by a Vietnamese person, who was subsequently arrested.

== Gallery ==
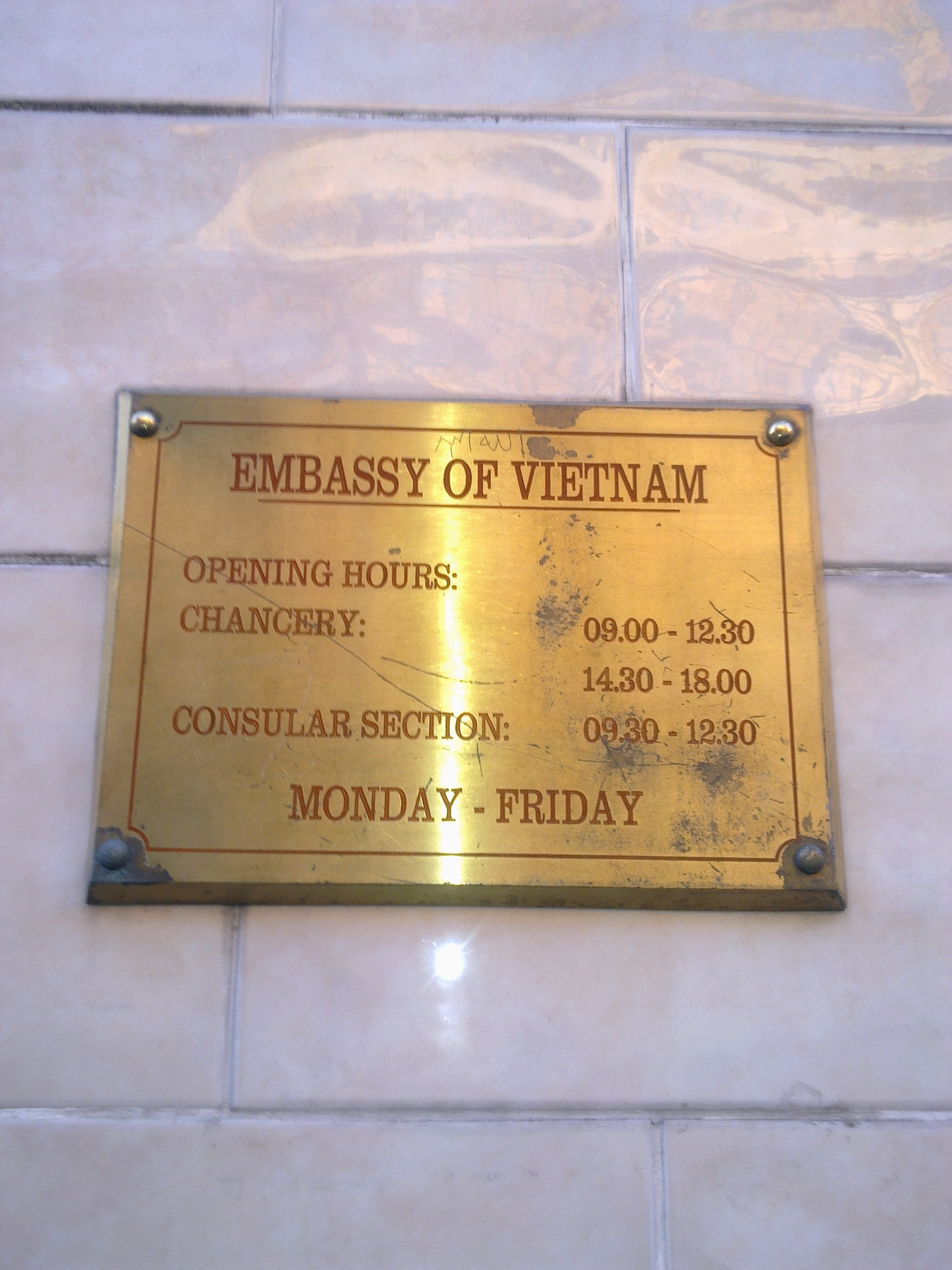
Plaque outside the embassy

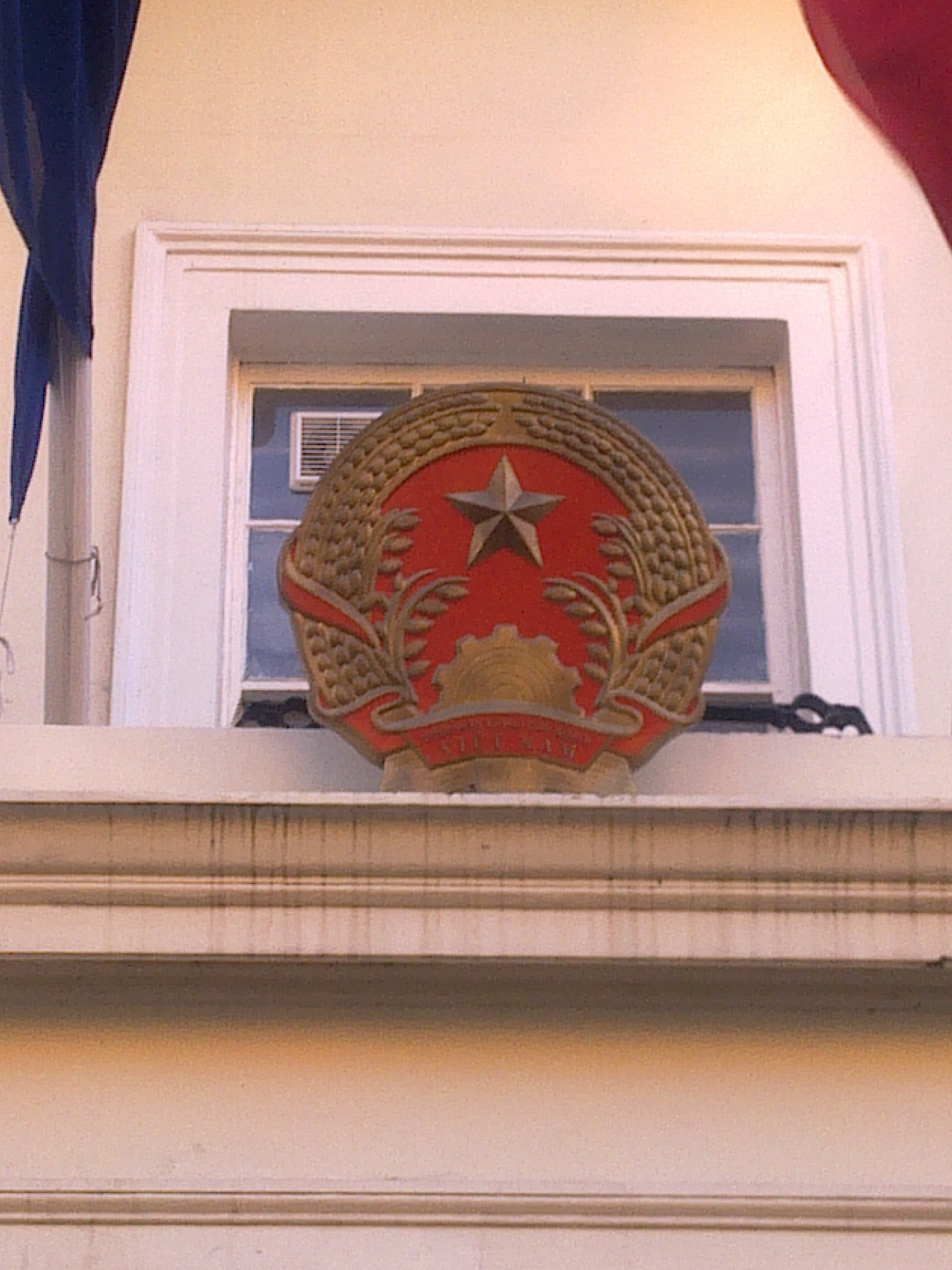
The Emblem of Vietnam above the entrance
