= Yang Bin (businessman) =

Chinese-Dutch businessman (born 1963)

Yang Bin (Chinese: 楊斌; born 1963) is a Chinese-Dutch businessman who was formerly listed as the second richest man in China by Forbes for 2001. He once held assets in the horticulture and real estate industries, owning stakes in the Euro-Asia Agricultural Holdings and Holland Village, China. His fall from grace came in 2002, when he was arrested on charges of tax evasion. In 2003 Yang Bin was sentenced to 18 years in prison. Yang was released from prison on September 26, 2016.

== Biography ==
Born in Nanjing, Yang lost his parents when he was five; he was raised by his grandmother and relatives. He was a former officer in the People's Liberation Army Navy. He later emigrated to the Netherlands in 1987, where he ran a textile business and became a naturalized Dutch citizen. He returned to China in 1995, starting his orchid business in Shenyang using modern horticultural techniques learned from the Netherlands.

In September 2002, North Korea chose Yang Bin to govern and lead the economic development of the Sinŭiju Special Administrative Region. Shortly after his appointment, Chinese authorities removed him from his home and placed him on house arrest on 4 October. He was formally arrested on charges of tax evasion in November. Yang Bin was then formally sentenced in July 2003 to 18 years, and was fined for 2.3 million renminbi. Many of the charges were related to the building of Holland Village, a 220-hectare Netherlands-themed development project in the suburbs of Shenyang. Included among the charges was the building of properties on land originally acquired for agricultural use.
