= Mozambique people smuggling disaster =

2020 deaths of 64 migrants in a lorry in Mozambique

On 24 March 2020, 78 people – 64 dead and 14 alive – were found in a shipping container on a lorry in Mozambique. It is believed that the group were migrating to South Africa illegally; the route they were on is one that is often used for that purpose.

== Background ==
Mozambique is a transit route for African migrants, attempting to reach the large economy in South Africa to find work. At least 200 immigrants traveling into the area, traveling from Egypt, Ethiopia, Malawi and Somalia have been arrested at the check point in 2020 with all indicating they were traveling to South Africa.

== Incident ==
Immigration staff discovered the victims after they stopped the vehicle, which had crossed the border from Malawi, at a checkpoint in Tete Province in northwestern Mozambique and heard noises from inside it. Outside temperatures for the day in Tete were around 34°C or 93°F. The surviving occupants said that they are Ethiopians who were traveling to South Africa.

== Victims ==
All the dead were male and are believed to have asphyxiated. The Ethiopian embassy in South Africa announced via Facebook that all the deceased victims had been identified with help from the surviving individuals.

The International Organization for Migration stated that the survivors were being treated for severe dehydration and exhaustion. Survivors were screened for COVID-19 and put into quarantine.

== Aftermath ==
The driver and his assistant – both of whom are Mozambican – were arrested. A provincial immigration spokesman told reporters that the driver told police that he had been promised 30,000 meticais (S$720) to transport the men, causing a manhunt to be launched for the intermediary who promised payment.

== Reactions ==
Ethiopian Prime Minister and Nobel Laureate Abiy Ahmed used Twitter to express his condolences. Ethiopia's President Sahle-Work Zewde also expressed her condolences.
