= Regional Hospital Wanica =

Regional hospital in Lelydorp, Suriname

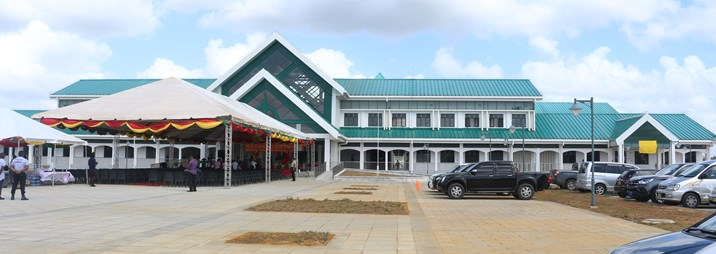
- Regional Hospital Wanica (February 2020)

Geography
- Location: Lelydorp, Wanica, Suriname
- Coordinates: 5.70597°N 55.17077°W

Services
- Beds: 180

History
- Founded: 7 February 2020

Links
- Website: Regional Hospital Wanica Facebook page
- Lists: Hospitals in Suriname

Regional Hospital Wanica (Dutch: Regionaal Ziekenhuis Wanica) is a hospital in Lelydorp, Suriname which primarily serves the Wanica District. The hospital, which officially opened in February 2020, is a beneficiary of China's Belt and Road Initiative. It is the first major hospital built after Surinamese independence in 1975.

== Development ==
The hospital's construction was funded by a US$28,000,000 contribution by the government of China with the government of Suriname spending an additional SR$120,000,000. During the opening ceremony held on 7 February 2020, Chinese ambassador to Suriname Liu Quan handed over a symbolic key to Minister of Public Works, Transport and Communications Vijay Chotkan, who handed the key to Minister of Health Antoine Elias, who handed the key to hospital chairman Pascual Zeegelaar. The hospital's pharmacy, general practitioner's post, and blood sampling department were operational at that time, with further plans for a radiology clinic, laboratory, kitchen, mortuary, and emergency department.

Ambassador Quan commented that the hospital was the largest China–Suriname project undertaken since 1976 and the largest single donation made by China to the Surinamese government. Upon completion, the hospital was expected to employ a staff of between 350 and 400 people, hiring mostly Surinamese medical professionals but with personnel expected to include Cubans, Dutch nationals, and Venezuelans as necessary.

China's investment in Regional Hospital Wanica, as well as other infrastructure projects around the country, took place under the aegis of the Belt and Road Initiative.

== Operations ==
=== COVID-19 pandemic ===
Even though the Regional Hospital Wanica was still partially under construction upon the outbreak of the COVID-19 pandemic, in March 2020 it was decided to mobilize the hospital to quarantine suspected COVID-19 patients, along with the Marwina Hospital. A team from Academic Hospital Paramaribo, supported by Cuban staff, hurriedly worked to prepare Regional Hospital Wanica in hopes of reducing strain on 's Lands Hospitaal and Sint Vincentius Hospital.

Antoine Joly, French ambassador to Suriname, tested positive for COVID-19 on 24 March 2020 and was immediately admitted to Regional Hospital Wanica. He was subsequently transferred to 's Lands Hospitaal and praised the efforts of Surinamese medical staff. Ambassador Joly was the eighth confirmed case of COVID-19 in Suriname.

By August 2020, Regional Hospital Wanica was nearing full capacity, resulting in a field hospital being set up on hospital grounds to handle the accelerated rate of infections.

=== Subsequent history ===
While operational, Regional Hospital Wanica remained under development following the COVID-19 pandemic. In October 2025, Minister of Public Health André Misiekaba publicly commented on the poor quality of local infrastructure, particularly the inadequate road connecting the hospital with the main highway, which was part of the original construction project but was not completed for unknown reasons. Minister of Public Works Stefan Tsang agreed to make construction of the road a top priority.

According to hospital director Nawin Bhageloe, development of the hospital lagged after the emergency period of COVID-19 due to decreased attention. Additionally, hospital management has struggled to attract sufficient medical personnel; as of February 2026, the hospital employed approximately 160 staff members.
