= Majoie Hajary =

French pianist and composer (1921–2017)

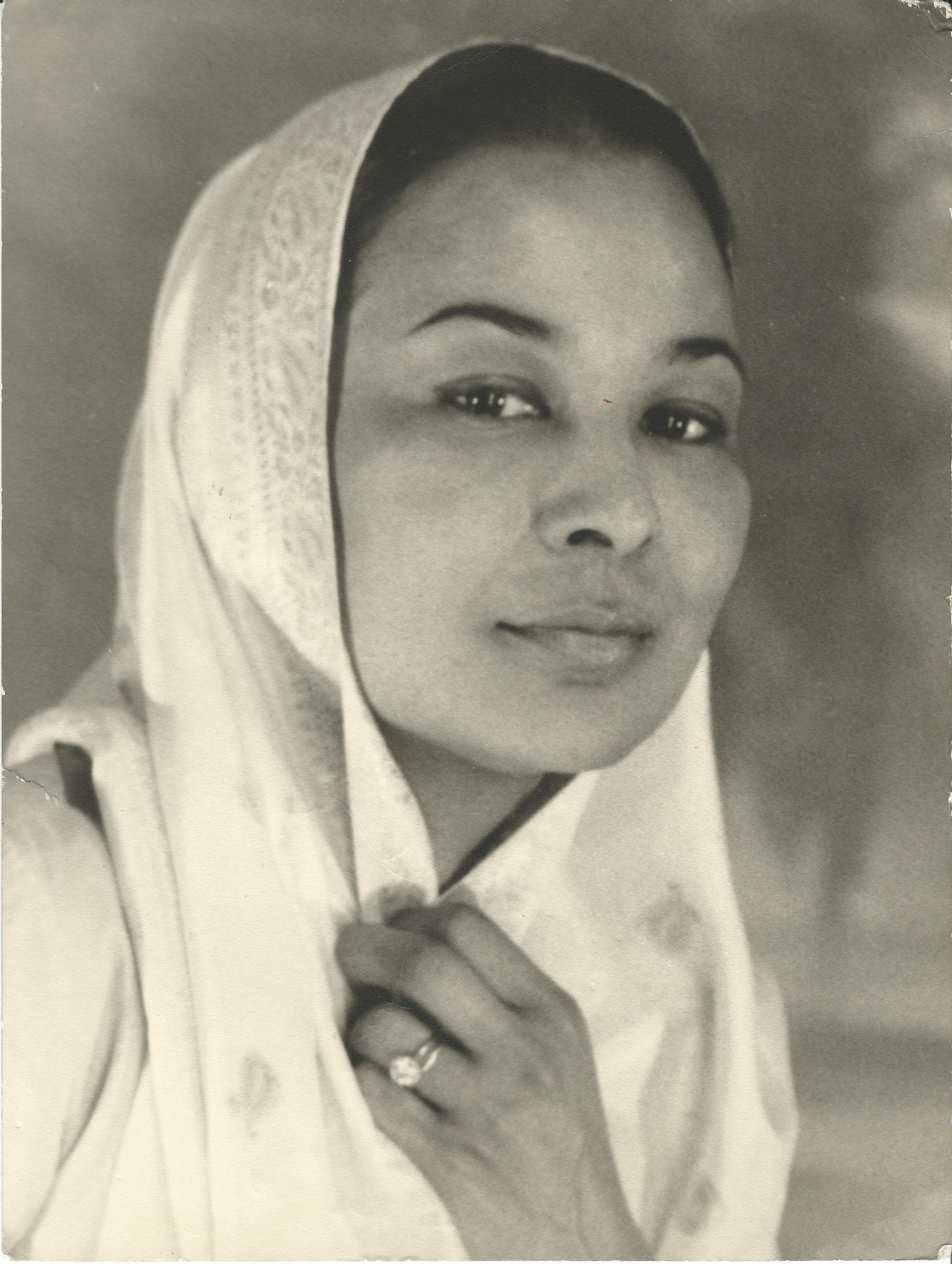
- Hajary in 1951
- Born: Marie Majoie Hajary; 16 August 1921; Paramaribo, Suriname
- Died: 25 August 2017 (aged 96); Neuilly-sur-Seine, France
- Burial place: Old Cemetery of Neuilly-sur-Seine
- Education: Amsterdam Conservatory
- Occupations: Composer and pianist
- Spouse: Roland Garros (1924–1983)
- Children: 2
- Parents: Harry Najaralie Hajary (father); Wilhelmina Tjong-Ayong (mother)
- Relatives: Frits Tjong-Ayong (uncle)

Marie Majoie Hajary (16 August 1921 – 25 August 2017) was a Surinamese-born Dutch-French composer and pianist of contemporary classical music and jazz. She was also a translator and wrote several books for pianists.

== Life ==
Majoie Hajary (sometimes spelled Majoye Hajary) was born in South America in 1921 in Paramaribo, Suriname, as the eldest of three daughters in a wealthy family. Her father Harry Najaralie Hajary (1892–1959) was a prominent official of the then-Dutch colony and was Hindustani. Her mother Wilhelmina Tjong-Ayong (1896–1976), from the Tjong Ayong family, was of Creole and Chinese descent. Her uncle was Frits Tjong-Ayong, who served the director of Sint Vincentius Hospital from 1 August 1938 to 1981. Majoie received musical training from the nuns of a monastery in Gravenstraat, followed by an eight-year secondary education at the Hendrikschool.

In 1937, at the age of 16, Hajary went to study at the Amsterdam Conservatory where she studied piano with Nelly Wagenaar and composition with Hendrik Andriessen. In 1941, Margot Vos's booklet Sun Rays was published, for which Hajary composed the music and drew the illustrations. She graduated with honors as a performing pianist in June 1942. In 1943, she won the Conservatory's first prize for her composition Hindoustani Fantaisie, which was performed by the Concertgebouw Orchestra.

In the mid-1940s, Hajary gave Dutch Kultuurkamer concerts throughout the Netherlands and went on tour through Germany and Austria. In 1947, she moved to Caracas, Venezuela and gave concerts in Central and South America. She also regularly visited her native country of Suriname. In 1949, she moved to Paris to study composition with Louis Aubert and Nadia Boulanger.

In 1951, at Notre-Dame-de-Grace de Passy in Paris, Hajary married Roland Garros (1924–1983), nephew of the famous French aviation pioneer Roland Garros. The couple had two children and moved often because Roland worked as the director of several foreign offices of Air France. They lived in Madagascar, Lambaréné, Tokyo, New Delhi and Istanbul. In many places, Hajary arranged to perform concerts and teach students.

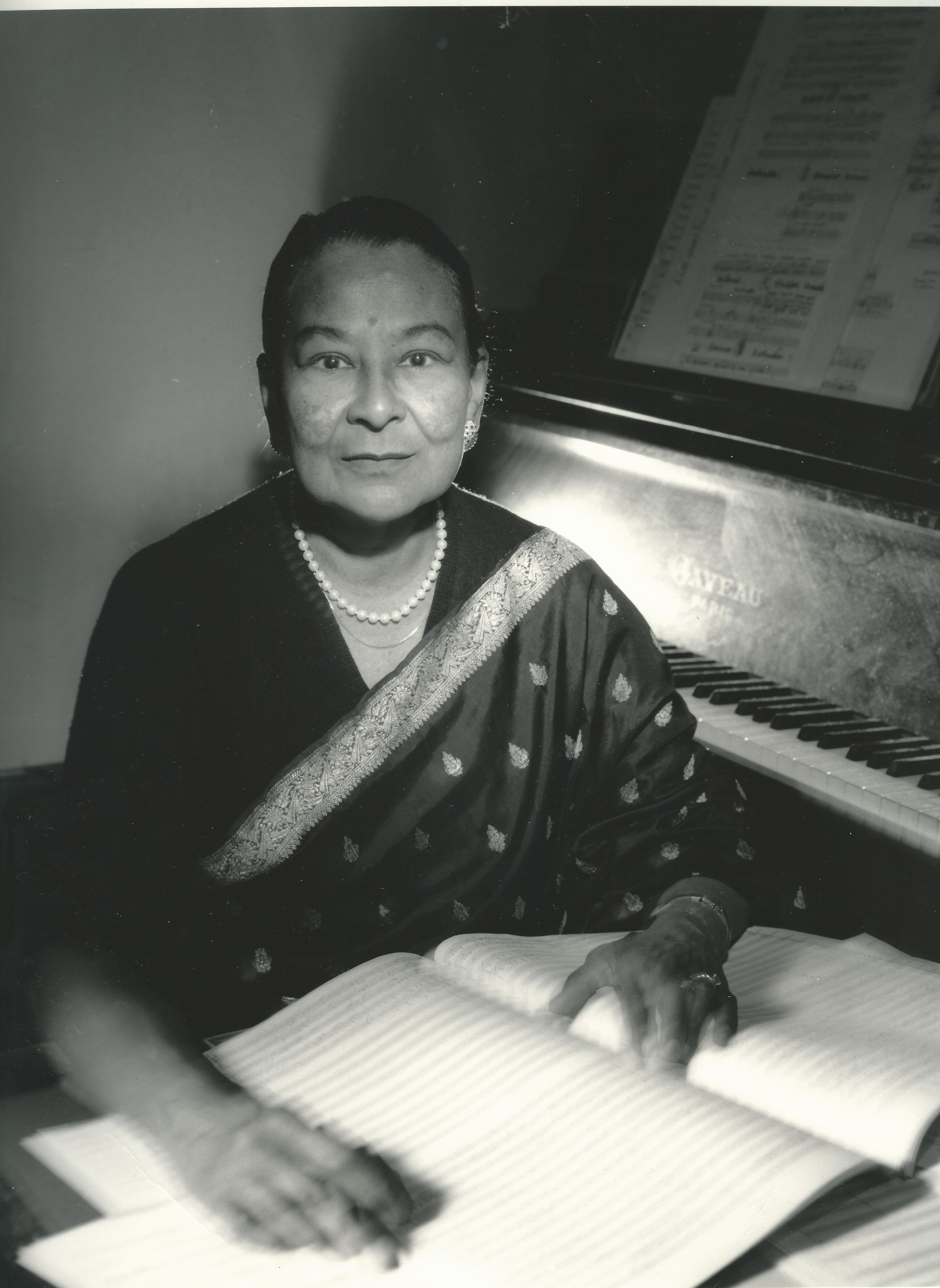
Hajary at work.

Hajary developed as a composer of world music with Indian influences and was sometimes called the "Hindu pianist." She started transcribing ragas and then went on to write them herself. Examples are New Sound From India (1967), Requiem pour Mahatma Gandhi (1968) and Chants du Gita Govinda (1974). In the 1960s she composed Da Pinawiki, an oratorio about the Passion of Christ. The text was based on her grandmother's Surinamese Bible and the oratorio was opened in Easter week from 1974 performed in several large churches of Paramaribo.

In addition to her performances, Hajary was also a writer and translated the work of others. She provided Max Havelaar's first translation into French.

On 25 August 2017, Hajary died at home at the age of 96, and she was buried in the Old Cemetery of Neuilly-sur-Seine, near Paris.

== Primary compositions ==
- Concerto for piano and orchestra: Hindoustani fantaisie (premiered at the Concertgebouw in Amsterdam), Broekmans & Van Poppel, 1943
- Indoue Ballet (Washington, performed by Lilavati Yaquilar), 1946
- Lieder (in German) text by Helle Von Heister, Unesco Paris, 1950
- Quartet: Jade Flute, 1954
- Play Koto (Tokyo), 1965
- New Sound From India (CBS), 1967
- Requiem For Mahatma Gandhi (CBS), 1968
- The Passion According to Judas (CBS), 1970
- Chants du Gita Govinda (Chants du monde) text by Marguerite Yourcenar read by Maurice Béjart, 1974
- Da Pinawieke - oratorio sung every year at Easter in Paramaribo, 1975
- Variations 87X1, 1976
- Blue Râga for piano and orchestra, 1977
- La Larme d'Or - opera in one prologue and three acts, 1996
- Râga du Prince - "il ritratto dell'amore" performed by Egon Mihajlovic and Jeremias Schwarzer, (Cybele), 1999

== Publications ==
- Le Yoga du Pianiste, Paris, 1987, reissued in 1991 (Sedim editor) and translated into Dutch (Strengholt-Naarden, La Haye, 1989)
- The Art of the Piano, a method within everyone's reach, Paris, 1989 (Choudens editor, ID Musique)
- La forme du Râga, Paris, 1991

== Translations ==
Hajary translated from Dutch to French.

- Planning by Professor Jan Tinbergen, Nobel Prize winner (Univers de la connaissance - Hachette - Paris, 1967)
- Max Havelaar de Multatuli (Edouard Douves Dekker) first translation in France (the previous versions being Belgian) (University editions - Paris, 1968)
- Telemachus in the village of Marnix Gijsen (university editions - Paris, 1969)
- Plants of the world by H. De Witt (Hachette, 3 volumes, Paris, 1966 - 1968 - 1969)
- Endangered peoples and customs: Black Africa by G. Pubben and C. Gloudemans (Grund-Paris, 1979)
