= SCTV =

SCTV may refer to:

- SCTV (TV network), an Indonesian television network
- Second City Television, a Canadian sketch comedy television program
- Sichuan Radio and Television, a Chinese television station
- Seven Regional, formerly Southern Cross Television, a television station throughout regional Australia
- South Coast Television, formerly South Coast Community Television, a deflector and Digital TV service in County Cork, Ireland
- Surinaams Chinees Televisie Station, a Surinamese television station
