= Kong Ngie Tong Sang =

Kong Ngie Tong Sang (Simplified Chinese: 广义堂生; Traditional Chinese: 廣義堂生; Pinyin: guǎngyì táng shēng) is a Sino-Surinamese association founded in 1880.

The group was established as Kong Ngie Tong on April 16, 1880, the name roughly meaning "Chinese Society Hall". Its founders were members of the Chinese Surinamese population that worked at the Catharina-Sophia sugar plantation, owned at the time by the Dutch colonial government. During the 1920s, the society practiced Piauw lottery, which was viewed by the authorities as illegal gambling and had to close in June 1930. A wealth Chinese businessman bought it in 1931 and renamed it Kong Ngie Tong Sang, with the syllable "Sang" also meaning "revived" (as in "Revived Chinese Society Hall"). The association already did boxing before 1911; the new association inherited the predecessor's other activities, such as dance, music and sports. In 1961, it began building the White Lotus sports and swimming complex.

Near the entrance, there is a duilian: 广联声气,义冠华洋 (Spread voice with unity, treat Chinese abroad with justice).

Kong Ngie Tong Sang also owns a newspaper (Kong Ngie Tong Sang Dagblad), a television station (SCTV) and a Sunday market.
