= Kong Ngie Tong Sang Sunday Market =

Market place in Paramaribo, Suriname

Central Market
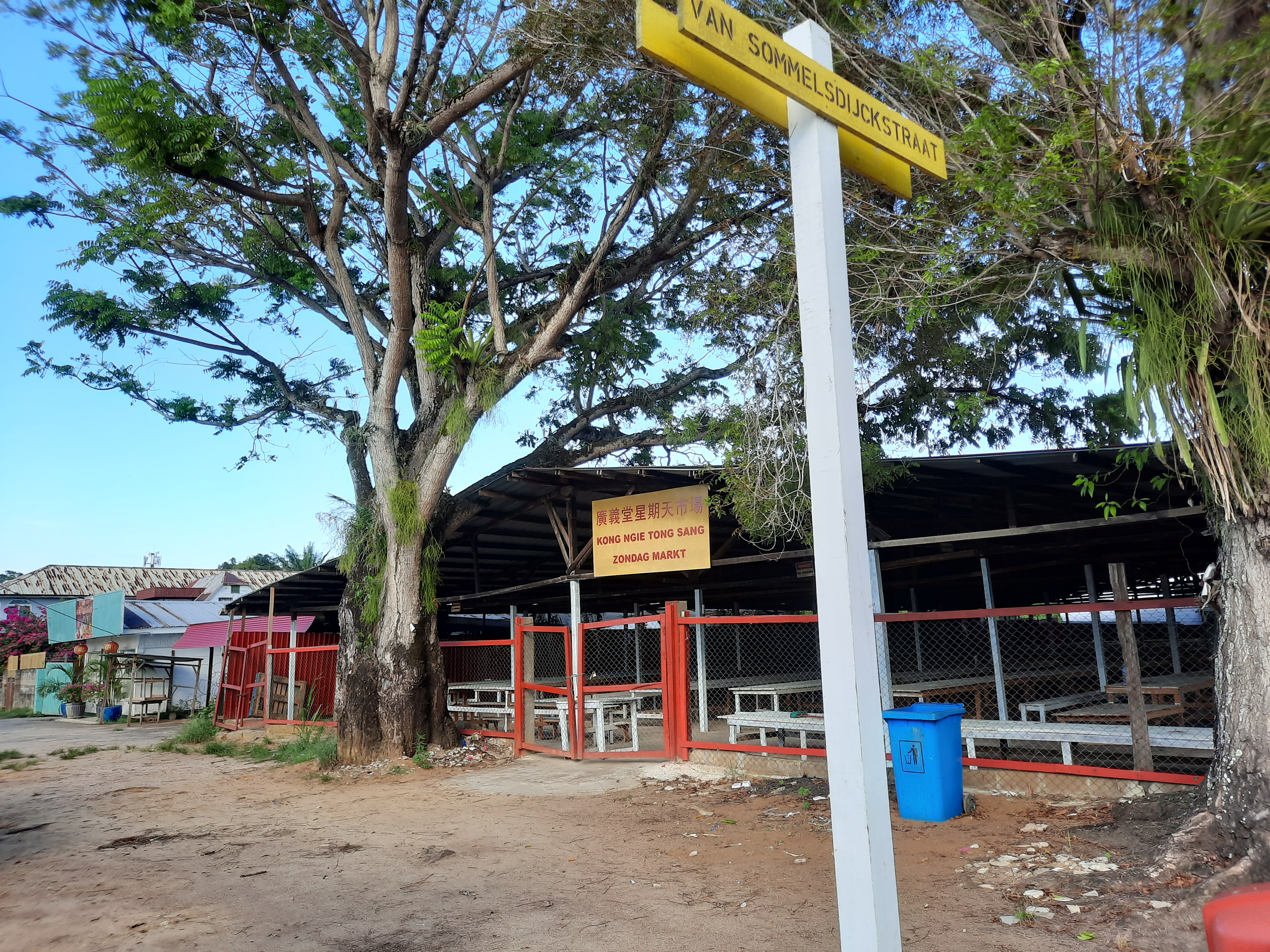
- entrance at Grote Combéweg

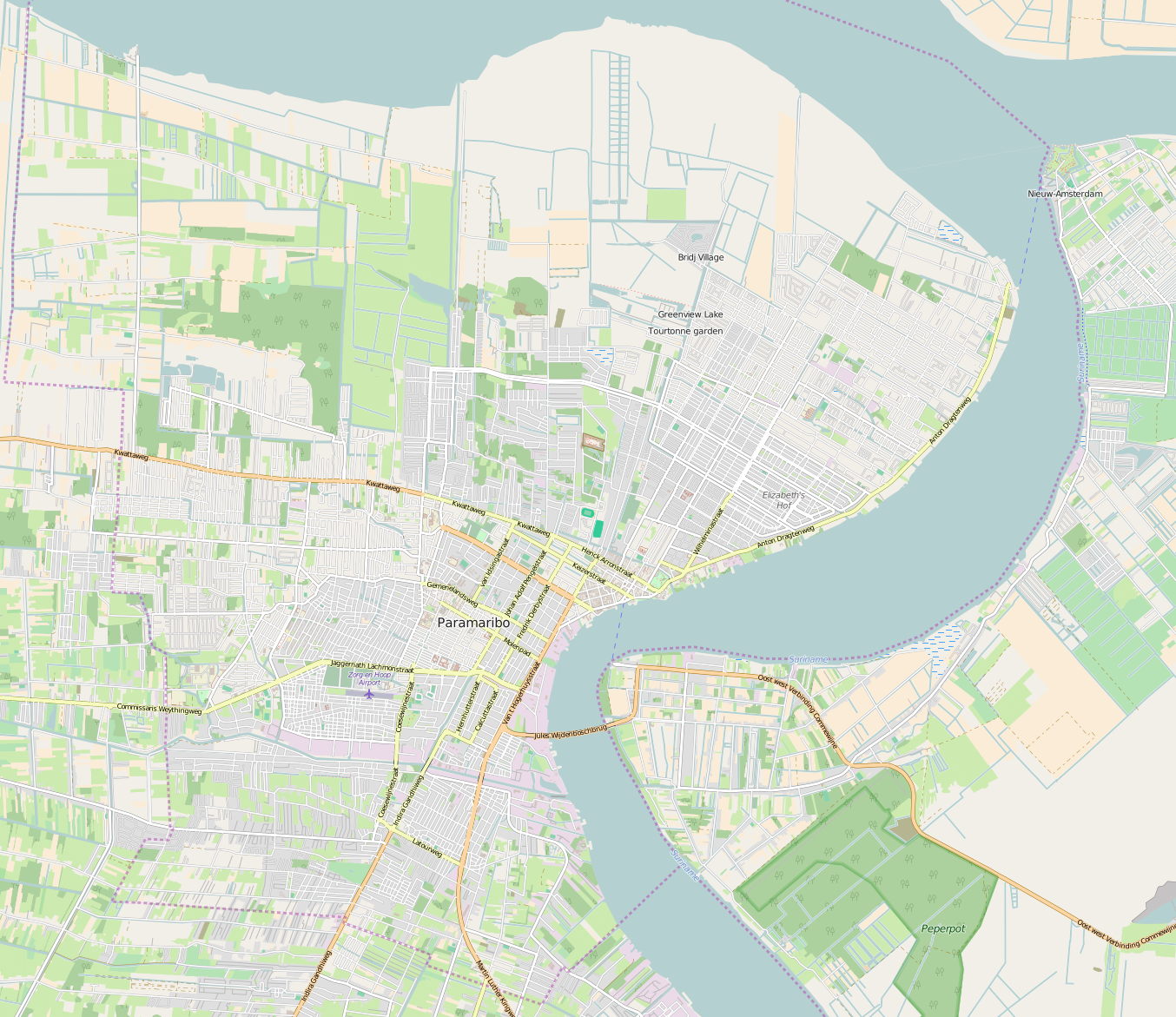
- Location within Paramaribo

General information
- Location: Paramaribo, Suriname
- Coordinates: 5.49496°N 55.08589°W
- Completed: 2011

The Kong Ngie Tong Sang Sunday Market is a marketplace in Paramaribo, Suriname, located on the corner between Grote Combéweg and Van Sommelsdijckstraat, close to Wakapasi and the Garden of Palms.

The market is open on Sunday mornings. It sells fresh fruits and vegetables, meat, fish and herbs, as well as spring water, dim sum and warm dishes. Sellers and most visitors are Chinese Surinamese. The market is owned by the Chinese society Kong Ngie Tong Sang.

The project is a copy of a wet market found on an Asian slum. It was intended to be established in 2008 at Kankantriestraat; however work was halted because of protests from sellers at the South Market. For a brief period, it operated at the Bun Dyari of Pertjajah Luhur, also at Grote Combéweg. In 2011, it moved to its present location. Despite objection notifications from district commissioner Mohamad Kasto and two members of the National Assembly, Kasto decided to tolerate the market.

== Gallery ==
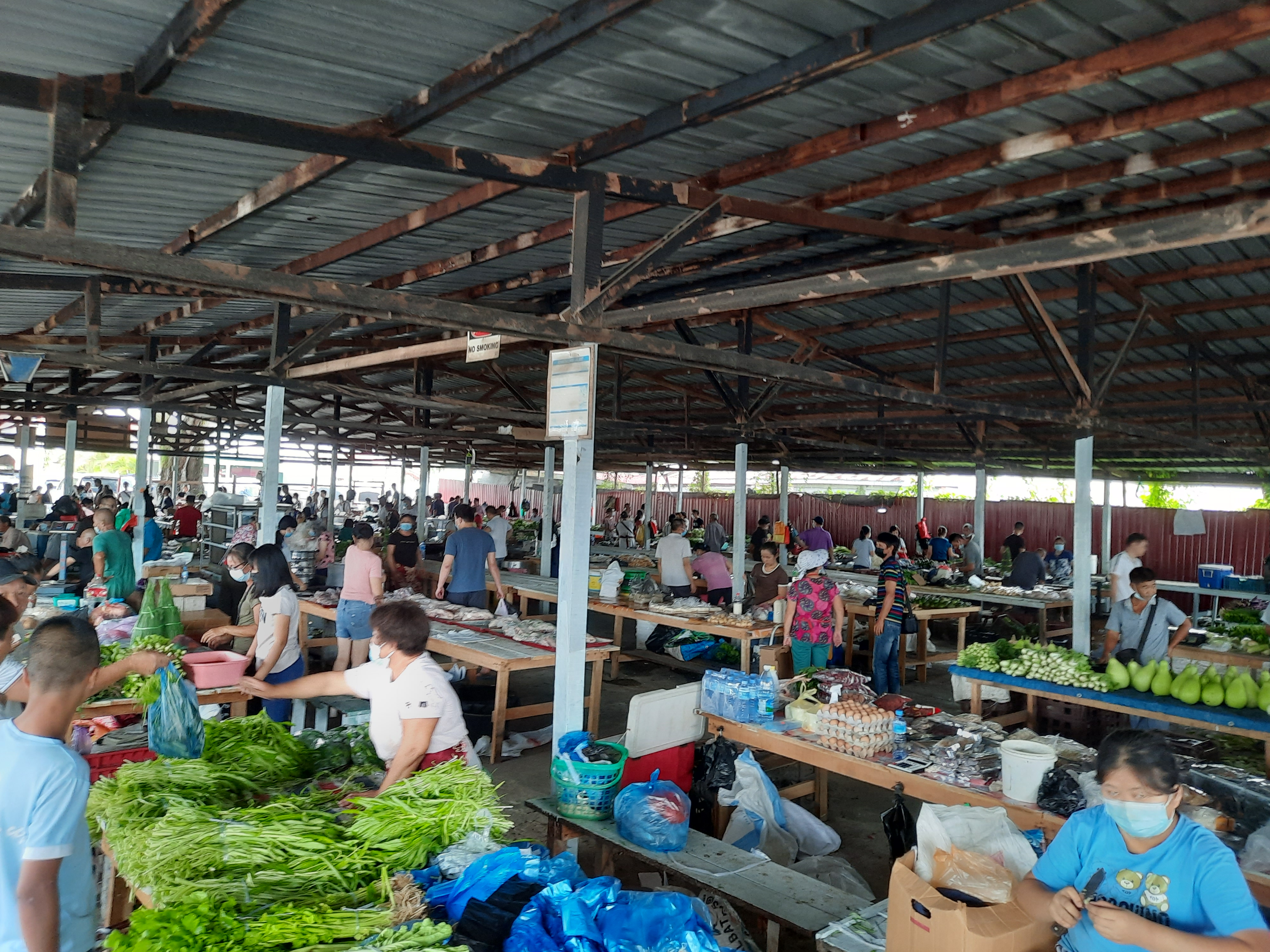
The market in 2022

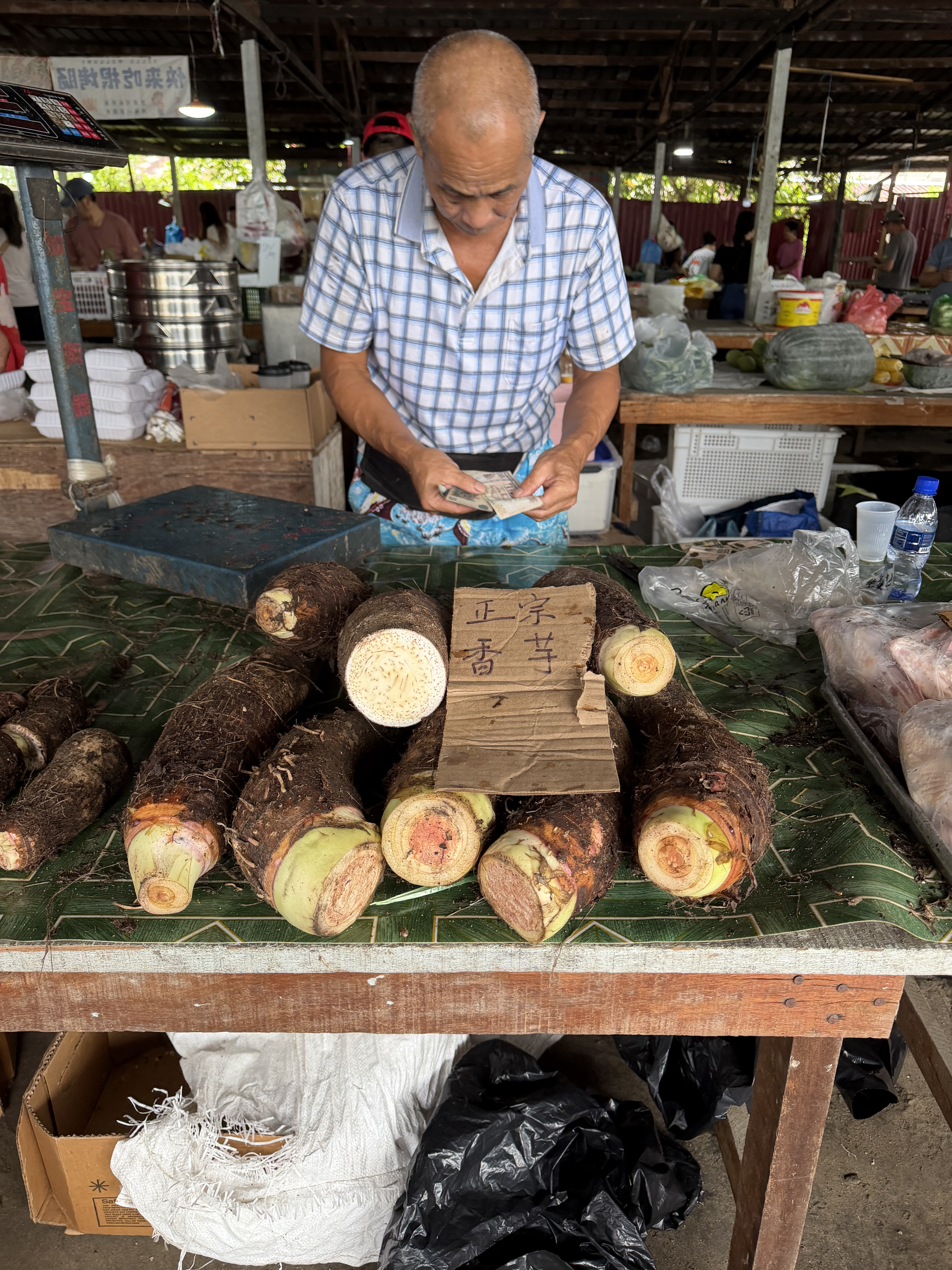
Market stall with Taro
