= Chinese Surinamese =

Chinese Surinamese people
Total population
- 7,885 (2012)

Regions with significant populations
- Paramaribo · Wanica

Languages
- Hakka · Cantonese · Hokkien · Mandarin · Dutch · Sranan Tongo

Religion
- No religion · Christianity · Chinese folk religion (incl. Taoism and Confucianism) · Buddhism

Related ethnic groups
- Chinese Caribbean · Chinese Dutch

Chinese Surinamese people are Surinamese residents of ethnic Chinese origin. The earliest migrants came in the 19th century as indentured laborers; there was another wave of migration in the 1950s and 1960s. There were 7,885 Chinese in Suriname at the 2012 census, constituting 1.5% of the total population. They constitute the largest component of the 'other' ethnic category, which makes up 2.3% of the population as per the CIA World Factbook. The majority of the Chinese Surinamese consider Hakka (Dongguan, Huiyang, Huizhou or Bao'an, Shenzhen) of Guangdong as their ancestral homes. There is a small minority of Heshan, Jiangmen-origin Cantonese and Hakkas as well.

Many Chinese Surinamese are active in the retail and business community. Six percent of the Chinese in the Netherlands migrated from Suriname.

== History ==
=== Indentured laborers ===
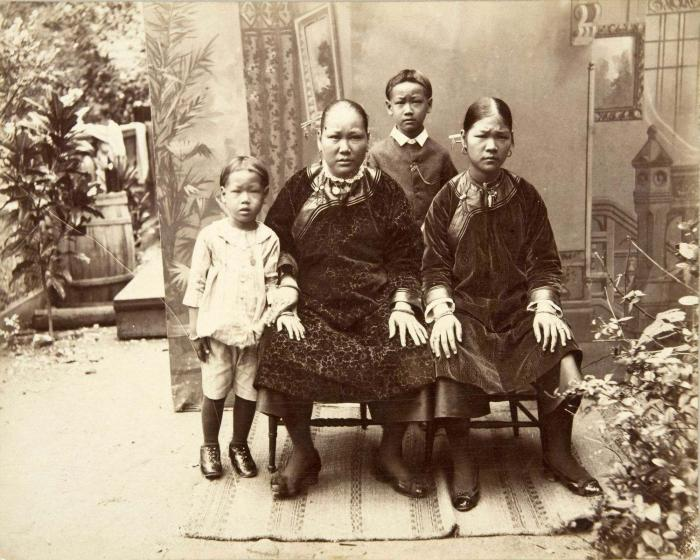
Southern Chinese migrant family

In 1853, planters in Suriname feared a labor shortage when slavery was about to be abolished. They asked the government to recruit other workers from abroad.

The government of Java recruited a group of 18 Chinese for indentured labor in the Catharina Sophia plantation in Saramacca. Because of the high acquisition costs, it was decided to get a second group, not from Java, but from China instead. In 1858, 500 Chinese laborers were recruited by the Dutch consul in Macau. They arrived in Suriname in April, but it turned out that no one wanted to hire people to do work that slaves would do "for free".

Because of this, the contract with the Chinese was changed without their knowledge by Governor Charles Pierre Schimpf, in favor of the employers. The Chinese could now be treated like slaves. When they would revolt against this, they were, without due process and contrary to existing regulations, punished by police with cane strokes, an unlawful act that was repeated again and again.

An interpellation (formal request for information) to the Minister of Colonies Jan Jacob Rochussen did not help.

In the 1850s and 1860s, about 2,500 Chinese people went to Suriname. Most were employed as indentured laborers on the plantations. After their contracts expired, many found opportunities in trade, mostly in food retail. Most of the male laborers were married to non-Chinese women. Those who married Chinese women, mostly married with an imported bride.

=== Later immigrants ===
Other Chinese came to Suriname as free laborers, traders and shop assistants, especially in the 1950s and 1960s. Further large numbers came in the 1990s. In 2007, there were over 70,000 Chinese in Suriname, and the immigration is still ongoing. The rapidly growing demand in China for wood and minerals makes Suriname very attractive to Chinese businesses. The new Chinese migrants from northern China are known in Suriname as "salt-water-Chinese".

Since the 1960s, thousands of Chinese have emigrated from Suriname to the Netherlands.

The Chinese held a prominent position in small and medium business for a long time, and their mostly well-educated offspring of mixed ancestry or Chinese ancestry can be found in various social sectors. Also, the Surinamese people have adopted several Chinese customs.

== Languages ==
The original Chinese settlers were Hakka from the Fuitungon region of Guangdong; Fui^{5}tung^{1}on^{1} means three places: Huiyang, Huizhou or Fui^{5}jong^{2}, Dongguan or tung^{1}kon^{1}, and Bao'an County, Shenzhen or pau^{3}on^{1}, Hakka was originally present and became the "old Chinese" of Guyana. It was previously the only spoken variety of Chinese in the country. Paul Brendan Tjon Sie Fat of the University of Amsterdam stated that Hakka people in Suriname do not frequently voice negative attitudes towards the fact that Hakka has a lower status than Dutch in Suriname.

In the 1970s, Cantonese was introduced into Suriname. Beginning in the 1990s, new migrants from China moved to Suriname, and Putonghua, during around 2004-2014, became the main Chinese lingua franca in the country.

There are Mandarin and Cantonese television shows aired in Suriname.

== Religion ==
Religion
Religion	Percent
No religion	49%
Christianity	27.4%
Other religions	20%
Hinduism	2%
Islam	1.4%

Most of the Chinese Surinamese are irreligious, with significant population adhering to Christianity. Hinduism and Islam are also followed by a small number of them. However, "many ... are Confucians".

== Notable people ==
- Henk Chin A Sen (陳亞先), President and Prime Minister of Suriname, 1980-1982; Chin paternal side was Hakka Chinese and maternal side was mixed Creole
- Frits Tjong-Ayong (張亞养), hospital director of Sint Vincentius Ziekenhuis from 1938-1981; first hospital director of Chinese descent in Suriname
- Lee-Roy Echteld, football player, of part Chinese ancestry from his Surinamese father
- Cerezo Fung a Wing, football player
- Roy Ho Ten Soeng, Mayor of Venhuizen, North Holland, 2000-2006; First immigrant Mayor of Netherlands; First Chinese Mayor of Netherlands and Europe
- Calvin Jong-a-Pin, football player; Jong-a-Pin is of mixed ancestry
- Michael P. Jong Tjien Fa (杨进华), cabinet minister, 2002-2010
- Guillaume Lo-A-Njoe, artist
- Etienne Shew-Atjon, football player
- Virgil van Dijk, Dutch footballer, of partial Chinese ancestry from his Surinamese mother, named Hellen Chin Fo Sieeuw.
- Humberto Tan, radio and television presenter, writer
- Tjin A Djie family, influential family
- Tjong Ayong family, influential family
- Renzo Tjon-A-Joe, swimmer
- Varina Tjon-A-Ten, first Chinese elected to the House of Representatives, 2003-2006; Tjon-A-Ten is of mixed ancestry with paternal Hakka Chinese grandfather who migrated from Guangdong to Suriname
- Jair Tjon En Fa, track cyclist
- Kian Fitz-Jim, Dutch footballer
- Nathan Tjoe-A-On, Dutch-born Indonesian footballer
- Aron Winter, member of Netherlands national football team that won the 1988 European Football Championship. Also represented Netherlands in the European Football Championship for 1996 and 2000, and FIFA World Cup, 1990, 1994 and 1998; Winter is of mixed ancestry and his paternal grandfather, Zhang Junqiang, is Surinamese Hakka.
- Maayke Tjin-A-Lim, Dutch athlete
- Mike Fung-A-Wing, Surinamese swimmer
- DJ Sun, Dutch-American DJ and Music Producer with roots from Suriname, completed an ancestral quest project to China on behalf of Asia Society Houston

== See also ==
- Chinese Caribbeans
- China–Suriname relations

== Bibliography ==
Articles

- Tseng, F., De grote oversteek: het lot van de Surinaamse Chinezen, China Nu 16 (4), 1991, 16-18.

Books

- Ankum-Houwink, J.C., De migratie van Chinezen naar Suriname, (z.p. ca. 1972).
- Ankum-Houwink, J.C., Chinese kontraktarbeiders in Suriname in de 19e eeuw, OSO, 4 (2), 1985, 181-186.
- Groenfelt, E., Impressies van de Chinese gemeenschap in Suriname: enkele culturele aspecten van Chinezen in Suriname, (z.p. 1995).
- Kom, Anton de, Wij slaven van Suriname, 1934
- Lamur, H.E., en J.A. Vriezen, Chinese kontraktanten in Suriname, OSO, 4 (2), 1985, 169-179.
- Man A Hing, W.L., The Hakkas in Surinam, in: The proceedings of the international conference on Hakkaology, (Hong Kong 1994), 189-195.
- Tjon Sie Fat, Paul B. Chinese New Migrants in Suriname: The Inevitability of Ethnic Performing (UvA Proefschriften Series). Amsterdam University Press, September 1, 2009. ISBN 9056295985, 9789056295981. Link at Google Books.
- Tjon Sie Fat, Paul B. "Old and New Chinese Organizations in Suriname" (Part IV: Chinese Migration in Other Countries: Chapter 12). In: Zhang, Jijiao and Howard Duncan. Migration in China and Asia: Experience and Policy (Volume 10 of International Perspectives on Migration). Springer Science & Business Media, April 8, 2014. ISBN 940178759X, 9789401787598. Start p. 189.
- Tjon Sie Fat, Paul B. "They Might as Well Be Speaking Chinese: The Changing Chinese Linguistic Situation in Suriname under New Migration." In: Carlin, Eithne B., Isabelle Léglise, Bettina Migge, and Paul B. Tjon Sie Fat. In and Out of Suriname: Language, Mobility and Identity (Caribbean Series). Brill Publishers, November 28, 2014. ISBN 900428012X, 9789004280120. Start p. 196.
- Zijlmans, G.C. en H.A. Enser, De Chinezen in Suriname. een geschiedenis van immigratie en aanpassing 1853-2000, ISBN 90-806479-3-4.
