= Tjong Ayong family =

Chinese-Surinamese family

Tjong Ayong 張亞养 Tjong-Ayong
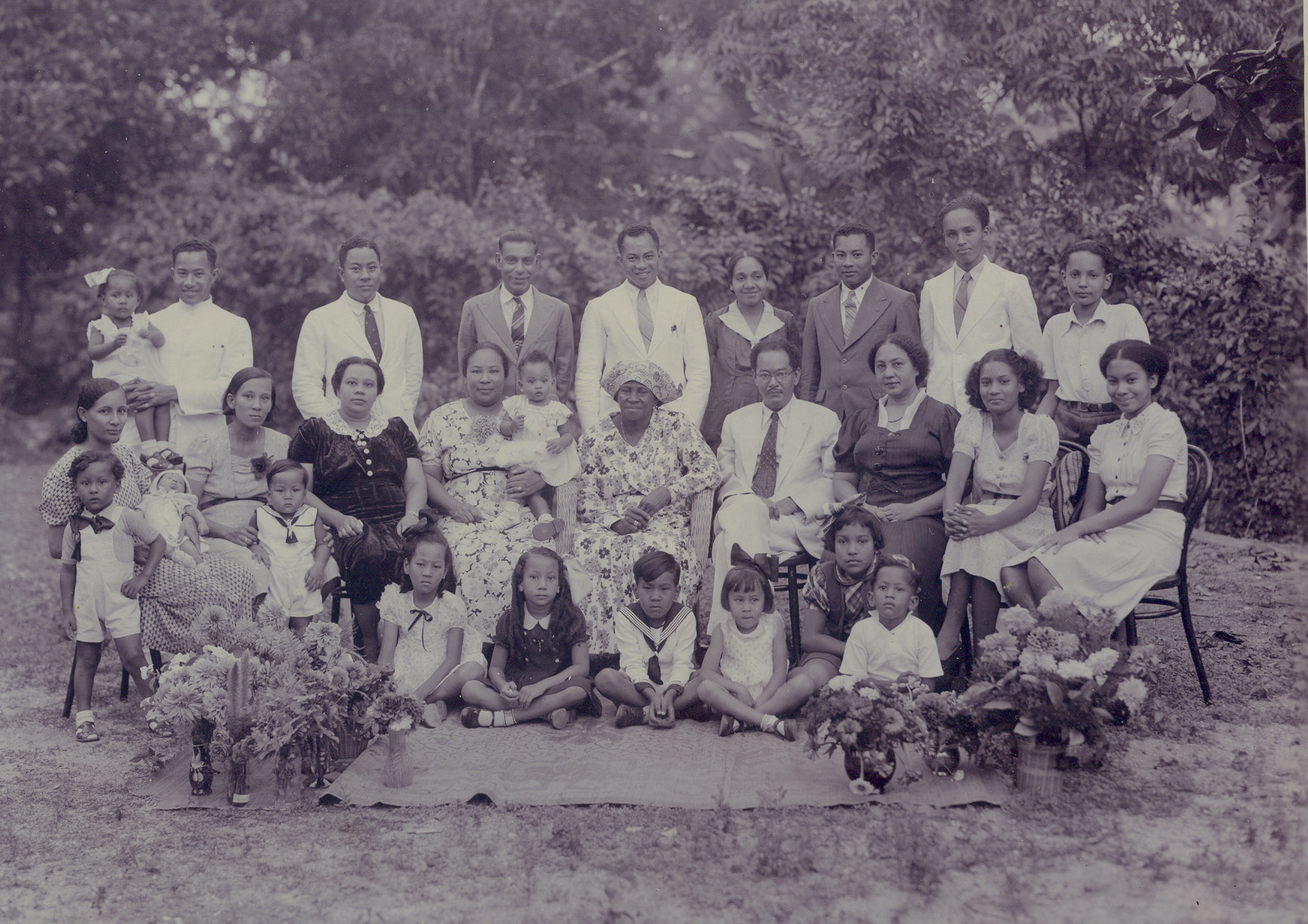
- Group portrait of the Tjong Ayong family in 1940
- Country: Suriname
- Origin: Lingshan County, Guangxi, China
- Founded: 1860s
- Founder: Willem Tjong-Ayong

The Tjong-Ayong family is a Surinamese family of Chinese descent known for its contributions to medicine, business, performing and visual arts, and social activism. The family has produced Suriname's first hospital director of Chinese descent, as well as numerous physicians, artists, business leaders, and public intellectuals active in Suriname, Indonesia, the Netherlands, France, Germany, and other countries. Notable members of the Tjong-Ayong family include hospital director Frits Tjong-Ayong, composer and pianist Majoie Hajary, dancer and choreographer Ilse-Marie Hajary, politician Carry-Ann Tjong Ayong, actress Manoushka Zeegelaar Breeveld, musical artist George Tjong-Ayong, and jazz vocalist Henny Vonk.

== Origin of the name ==
The surname Tjong-Ayong is derived from the Hakka Chinese family name "Tjong" or "Chong" (張) and the given name "Ayong" (亞养). This type of compound surname was common among Chinese indentured laborers and immigrants in Suriname, where naming conventions often merged personal and family names during immigration registration or baptism.

== Family patriarch ==
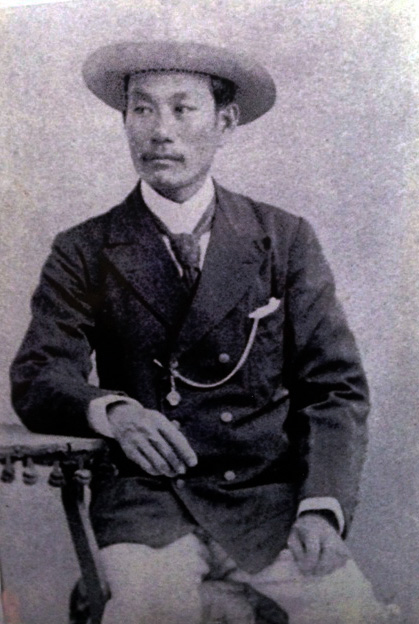
Willem Tjong-Ayong

The patriarch of the Tjong-Ayong family was Willem Tjong-Ayong (born Tjong Ayong 張亞养), who was born on 30 May 1869 at the Catharina Sophia plantation in Suriname. His mother, Jong Lim Fay, came from Limsam (Lingshan County 靈山縣), Guangxi Province, China, and arrived in Suriname in 1866 aboard the Whirlwind. His father, Tjong Ho Foeng (also known as A Foeng Pak), came from another Hakka community in southern China.

Originally known as Tjong Ayong, he later adopted the given name Willem, and his full name became the family surname: Tjong-Ayong. He was an avid reader and a respected businessman who owned a shop in Paramaribo.

He was first married in a traditional arranged Chinese marriage from which one child, A Kwie, was born. Following their divorce, his ex-wife continued to use the name Tjong-Ayong, and eventually had children with another partner using the same last name. His second marriage was to Carolina Beathseba Esse, on 18 October 1911. Together they had seven children, many of whom became notable professionals.

== Children and descendants ==
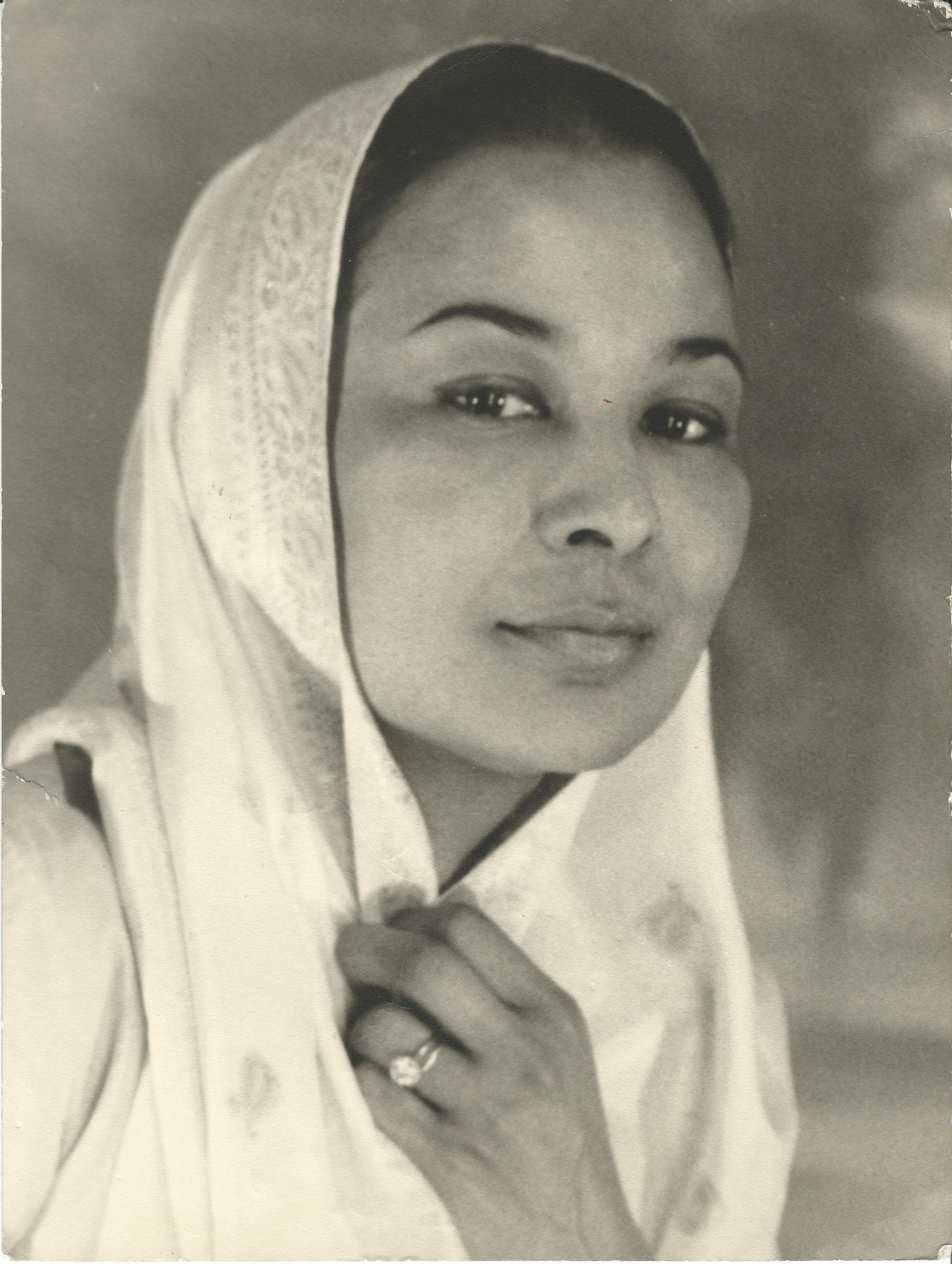
Majoie Hajary, composer and musician

Children and descendants of Willem Tjong-Ayong include:

- Willem Frederik Robert (b. 1894) – A physician who worked in the Dutch East Indies (now Indonesia) from 1921 to 1938. He authored a medical textbook in 1932. He had three children, including:
  - Willem Carel Albert Henry (b. 1921) – physician
  - Dorothea Christina Nelly Grace (b. 1923) – physician
- Philippintje Wilhelmina Albertina “Mientje”/“Maake” (b. 1896). Married to Harry Hajary. She had three children:
  - Majoie (Garros) Hajary (1921–2017) – internationally known composer and pianist based in France
  - Eleonoor Caroline (Toetie) (van Binnendijk) Hajary – actress and traditional Indian dancer
  - Jetty (Haakman) Hajary – pianist

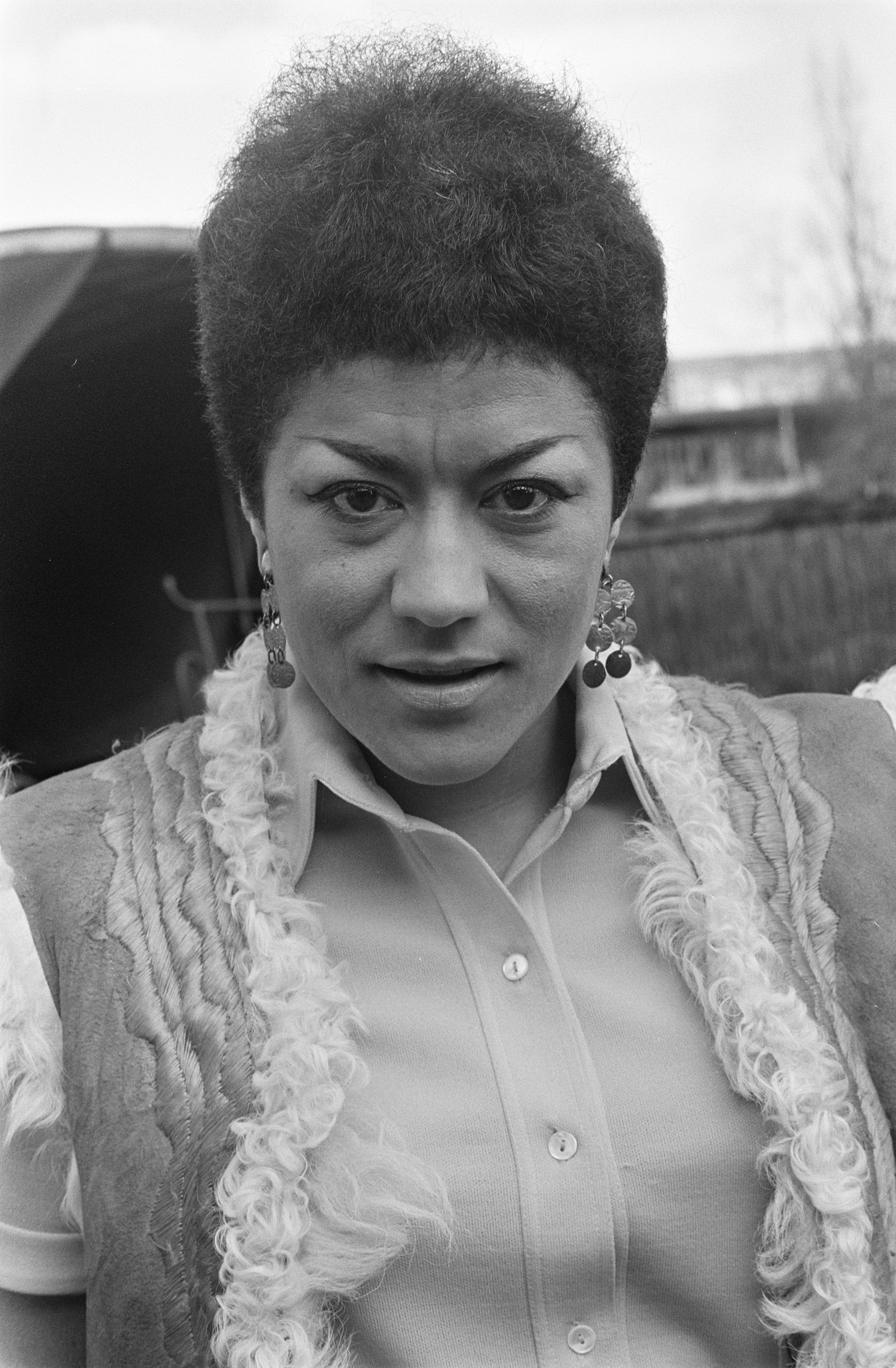
Henny Vonk, jazz vocalist

- Adolf Ethelrid René “Ettie” (b. 1906) – radio telegraph operator, helmsman, and violinist. Four children, including:
  - Henny Vonk (b. 1937) – jazz vocalist in the Netherlands
- Joseph (b. 1908) – accountant and general manager for the Chinese-owned Ma Ajong enterprise in Paramaribo. Nine children, including:
  - Robert (b. 1943) – physician in Suriname
- Henny (b. 1908) – twin brother of Joseph. Died at age 29, leaving four children, including:
  - Ethelrid Rudolph (b. 1933) – physician
  - Johanna Christina (b. 1935) – psychiatrist in the Netherlands
- Leonard George Adriaan “Leo” (b. 1910) – accountant and general manager of the department store C. Kersten & Co in Paramaribo. Six children, including:
  - Carl – dentist
- Frits André Tjong-Ayong (1912–1993) – Suriname's first hospital director of Chinese descent, he led St. Vincentius Hospital from 1938 to 1981. He was trained as a surgeon and urologist in the Netherlands and had five children, including:
  - Nell – author
  - Fritz – architect at TU Delft, founder of Tjong-Ayong Architects and Suriname's first archery club
  - Carry-Ann (b. 1941) – Dutch politician, poet, and social activist

== Fields of contribution ==
=== Medicine ===
Multiple generations of the Tjong-Ayong family served as physicians, including:

- Willem F.R.
  - Willem (Willem F.R.'s son)
  - Thea (Willem F.R.'s daughter)
- Frits André, director of St. Vincentius Hospital
- Ethelrid Rudolph (Henny's son)
- Johanna Christina (Henny's daughter)
- Robert (Joseph's son)
- Carl (Leonard's son)
- Sebastien Garros (Maake's grandson)

=== Music and performing arts ===
- Majoie Hajary (Maake's daughter), international composer and pianist
- Henny (Ettie's daughter), jazz singer
- Toetie Hajary (Maake's daughter), actress and dancer
- Jetty Hajary (Maake's daughter), pianist
- Ilse-Marie Hajary (Maake's granddaughter) ballet choreographer and cultural innovator
- Manoushka Breeveld (Joseph's granddaughter), actress
- George (Leo's grandson)
- Marie (Leo's granddaughter)

=== Business ===
- Willem Tjong-Ayong, merchant and trader
- Joseph, general manager at Ma Ajong
- Leonard, general manager at Kersten
- Fritz (Frits's son), architect, national archery club founder

=== Activism and literature ===
- Carry-Ann Tjong Ayong – awarded Dutch royal honors for her social engagement and contributions to literature
- Chandra van Binnendijk (Maake's granddaughter), writer
- Nell (Frits's daughter), writer

== In Israel ==
A branch of the family descended from Frits André Tjong-Ayong changed their surname to Tjong-Alvares after immigrating to Israel.

== See also ==
- Chinese Surinamese
- Tjin A Djie family
