= Tjin A Djie family =

Tjin A Djie
- Pronunciation: Chin Aa Jee

Origin
- Origin: Guangdong, China
- Region of origin: Suriname

Other names
- Related names: Tjin-Kon-Fat

The Tjin A Djie family is a family from the country of Suriname. It is one of the earliest Chinese Surinamese families, having arrived in Suriname in 1866. The descendants are known for their role as entrepreneurs and sporters. The family has been active at plantations for rice and vegetables. In the 20th and 21st centuries, descendants have been active in tennis and golf. In the 2010s The annual Opa Leo Tjin A Djie Tennis Tournament is being sponsored by them.

Branches of the family today can be found predominantly in Suriname, with members residing in North America and Europe, such as in the Netherlands. Their ancestor's full name was Tjin A Djie, but the root and base surname is Tjin.

== History ==
=== Joseph Tjin A Djie (1835–1903) ===
Upon a family reunification program, Joseph Tjin A Djie (1835–1903) moved from Kwangtung, China, to Suriname on the ship Whirlwind. He arrived in Suriname in 1866. In Suriname he began the development of a plantation that grew rice and various vegetables. On 15 March 1876 He obtained a license to begin opening grocery stores on a plantation in Mon Trésor.

He married a Chinese woman and they had two sons named Eduard (Kon-Fat) (1871–1930), and Rudolf (A-Djie) (1880–1962).

=== Eduard Alphons Tjin-Kon-Fat (1871–1930) ===
Eduard Alphons Tjin Kon Fat
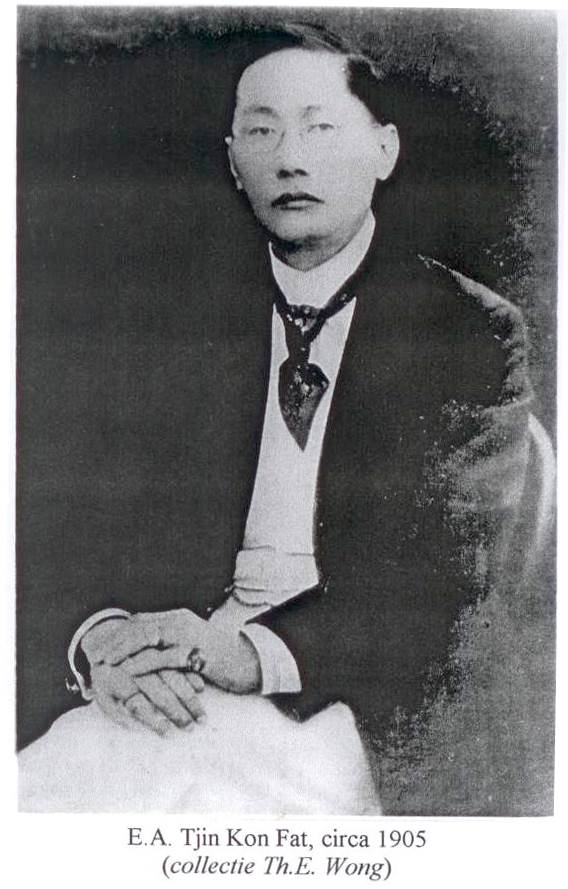
- Eduard Alphons Tjin-Kon-Fat; Circa 1905 (Collection: Th. E. Wong)

Eduard Alphons Tjin Kon Fat was a businessman who became wealthy through various proprietorships, retail and trade. He married Louise Nielo, the daughter of a wealthy business family. Together they started their business, known as Tjin Kon Fat - Nielo & Co. In 1899 a fire destroyed their business on Waterkant, but they were able to restart it again, using the Nielo family store at the Saramaccastraat. He later left his wife and her family in bankruptcy.

He predominantly was a plantation owner taking charge of at least three plantations: Oldenburg, Nieuw Meerzorg, and Monsort. His plantations grew rice, vegetables, coffee and coco. At the plantation Oldenburg his own rice peeling mills processed the raw materials into retail goods in which he sold in the supermarkets that he owned at Oldenburg, Nieuw Meerzorg, Waterkant, and Poelepantje. In his stores, he sold items like furniture and appliances, clothing, thread, needles, fabric, perfume, powder, cosmetics, cognac and wine, food and groceries, stationary, and cigars. He furthermore had a match factory named “Vulcan” and a coffee restaurant named “Halikibe”, a pawnbroking firm, and a hardware store. Along with his store at Waterkant Tjin Kon Fat had an import and export company importing products from Hong Kong, the United States, the Netherlands, England, France, and China, as well as a car renting establishment.

In addition to his business activities, Tjin Kon Fat played an active role helping to develop communities. He was a board member for education and a board member for sports. Also he was a board member for radio stations, president of the Chinese association Moe Poen Sah, executive board member of the Green Cross, and was an alternate member of the Board of Appeal on the taxation of rental value [Dutch: Huurwaardebelasting].

==== Legacy ====
Tjin A Djie
- (Family Crest)
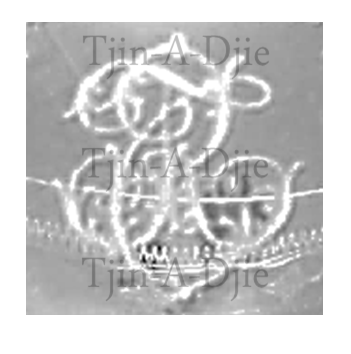
- The Family Crest of the Tjin A Djie Family of Suriname. It depicts a "R" and a "T" indicating Rudolf J. Tjin A Djie. (Watermarked)

Eduard Tjin Kon Fat married and had a number of children. At least four are known.

- H. Tjin Kon Fat (female) was the chairman of the Catholic Suriname soccer team, and treasurer for “Boys” tennis club.
- J. Tjin Kon Fat (female) took part in collecting for the church.
- Estelle Tjin Kon Fat (female)
- Edy Tjin Kon Fat (female) (died 2011). Edy became a judge, law professor and entrepreneur. The descendants of Eduard have the surname Tjin-Kon-Fat.

=== Rudolf J. Tjin A Djie (1880–1962) ===
Rudolf J. Tjin A Djie was a prosperous merchant and industrialist. He was born in Albina and met a young black woman. They had one child together, named Joseph (February 19, 1899 – 1988).

He was an owner of gold mines near French Guiana and often went to the other side of the border for shopping purposes; there he met his wife, named Elisabeth Marie (Majotte) Tong Lee A Tai. She was of Vietnamese descent and was born in Paris in 1883. Her family was wealthy and was established within the French culture scene. They married on 15 September 1904." Elisabeth had a fascination for fashion, craftsmanship, and artistry and had much influence on the family crest. In Suriname she established a millinery shop, creating and selling stylish hats.

Although Rudolf spoke Dutch and Elisabeth spoke French, they communicated with each other in the Surinamese creole language Sranan Tongo. In 1938 Rudolf Tjin A Djie also became the owner of the Hollandia bakery.

==== Legacy ====
Rudolf J. Tjin A Djie and Family
- (family portrait); Suriname, c. 1923–1925
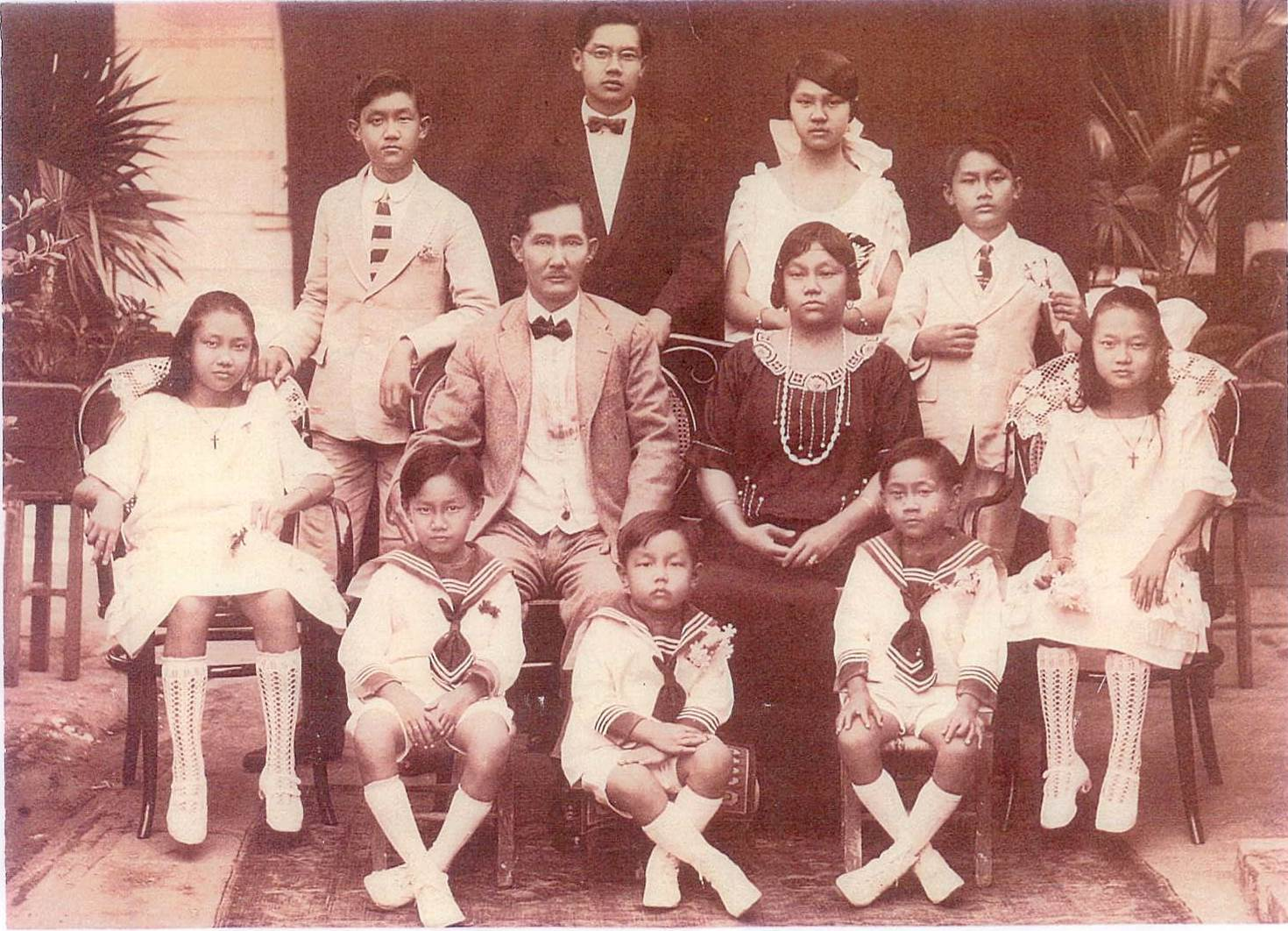
- Top: Herman, Eduard, Henriette, Leonard Middle: Agnes, Rudolf J., Elisabeth, Angeline Bottom: Arthur, Rudolf P.B., Raymond

Rudolf J. Tjin A Djie and Elisabeth Marie had nine children. They moved from Albina to Paramaribo when their children were young.

1. Eduard Leo Henri (October 15, 1905 – 1933) (Studying to be a doctor when died)
2. Henriette Magdalena Antoinette (February 14, 1907 – 1967) (Teacher)
3. Herman Rudolf Johan (November 6, 1910 – 1975) (Tennis champion, Vice President of Suriname Sports Committee, Founder of Tennis BOYS, Board member of the Suriname Tennis Association, Owner of lumber mill companies, President of Suriname K.L.N Airline)
4. Leonard Ernest Theodoor (March 29, 1912 – 1999) (Tennis champion, Treasurer of Suriname Sports Committee, Well known golfer, Member and champion of the Curaçao Racing Club, Rice plantation owner, Bakery owner, proprietor)
5. Agnes Regina Marie (September 13, 1913 – 2000) (Head of Chinese Association, member of the Roman Catholic RK School Board, Teacher, played active role in politics.)
6. Angeline Fanny Josephine (August 11, 1915 – June 18, 1926) (Died from typhus at sea—traveling to study—and was buried in the Gulf of Biscay)
7. Arthur Jean Marie (February 11, 1917 – 1979) (President of Suriname Pan American Airline executive lumber factory)
8. Raymond Octave Maurits (May 18, 1919 – 1988) (Owner of chicken, pig, and vegetable farms, and a store)
9. Rudolf Percy Benjamin (October 30, 1920 – 1991) (Owner of two grocery stores)

== Tjin A Djie and tennis ==
The Tjin A Djie family has made notable contributions to sports culture and industry in Suriname, specifically with tennis. The family produced three national champions in the sport. Herman Rudolf Johan and his brother Leonard Ernest Theodoor were national tennis champions between 1941 and 1957, with Herman’s second son becoming national champion in 1960.

== See also ==
- Tjong Ayong family
