= Diakonessenhuis (Paramaribo) =

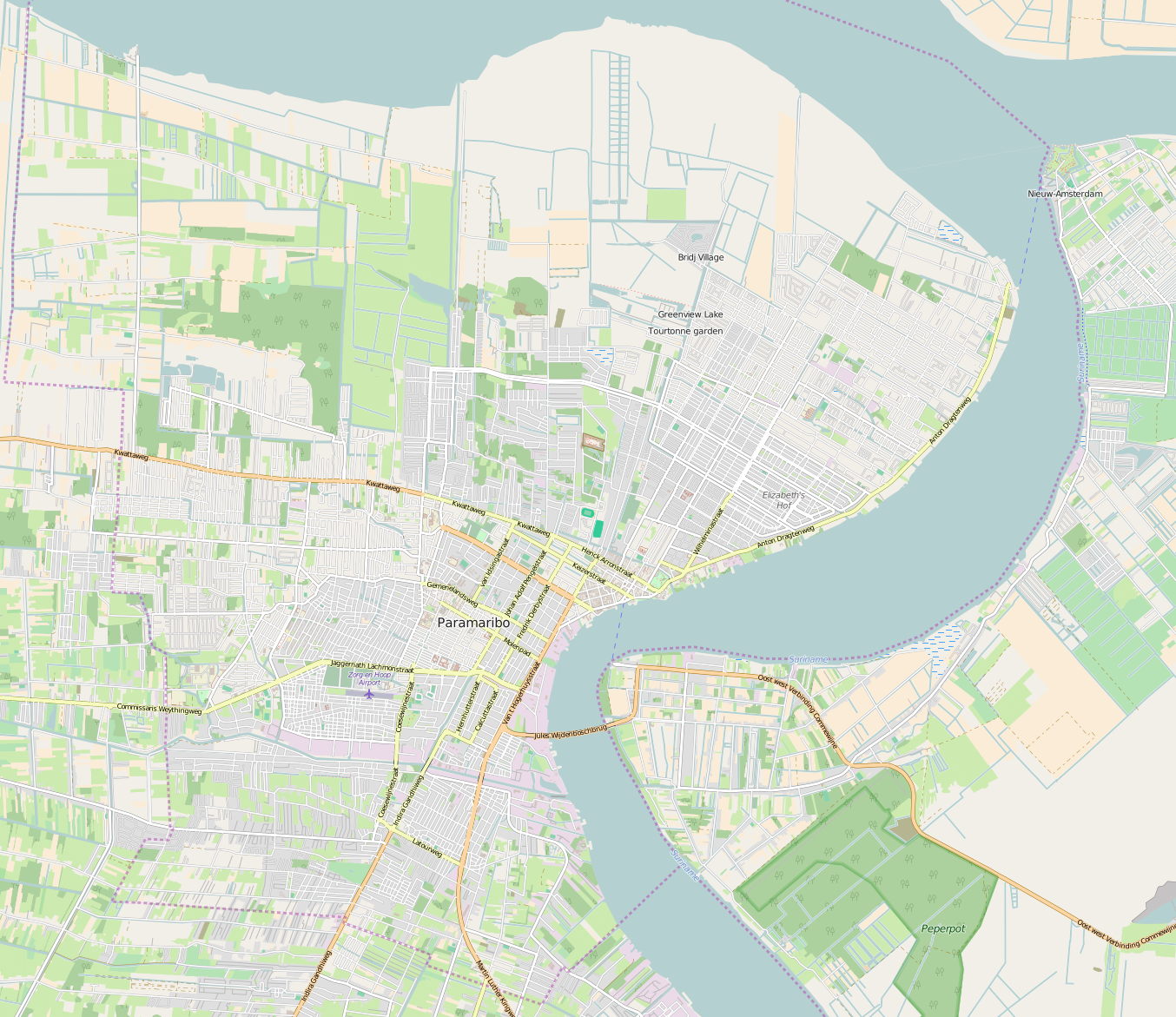
- Location within Paramaribo

Geography
- Location: Paramaribo, Suriname
- Coordinates: 5.822366°N 55.183445°W

History
- Founded: 30 November 1962

Links
- Website: www.diakonessenhuis.org
- Lists: Hospitals in Suriname

Diakonessenhuis is a hospital in Paramaribo, Suriname. It was founded as the Protestant hospital of Paramaribo.

== History ==
In 1946 a foundation was set up to start a Diakonessenhuis in Paramaribo, but only when the director of the Diakonessenhuis in Utrecht, dr. M.A. van Melle, took over the initiative in 1955 and contacted the Dutch public broadcaster NCRV did developments grow more seriously. In 1960 a fundraising show was broadcast on television which generated more than 2 million Dutch guilders. Together with a large donation from Suralco and a low interest loan of the same amount, there was enough money to build a hospital.

In late 1961 construction was started, and the hospital eventually opened on 30 November 1962.

== Notable births ==
- Zachari Zeegelaar (born 1989), FIFA football referee, born at Diakonessenhuis

== See also ==
- Academic Hospital Paramaribo, a university hospital in Paramaribo;
- 's Lands Hospitaal, a general hospital in Paramaribo
- Sint Vincentius Hospital, a Catholic hospital in Paramaribo
