= Academic Hospital Paramaribo =

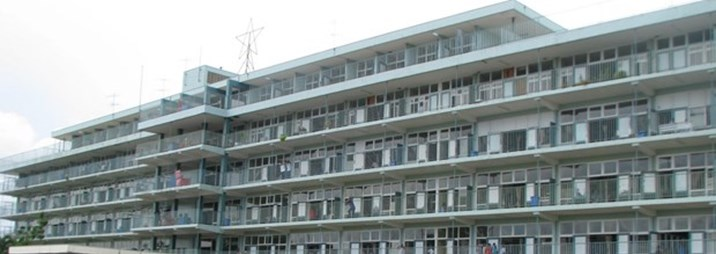

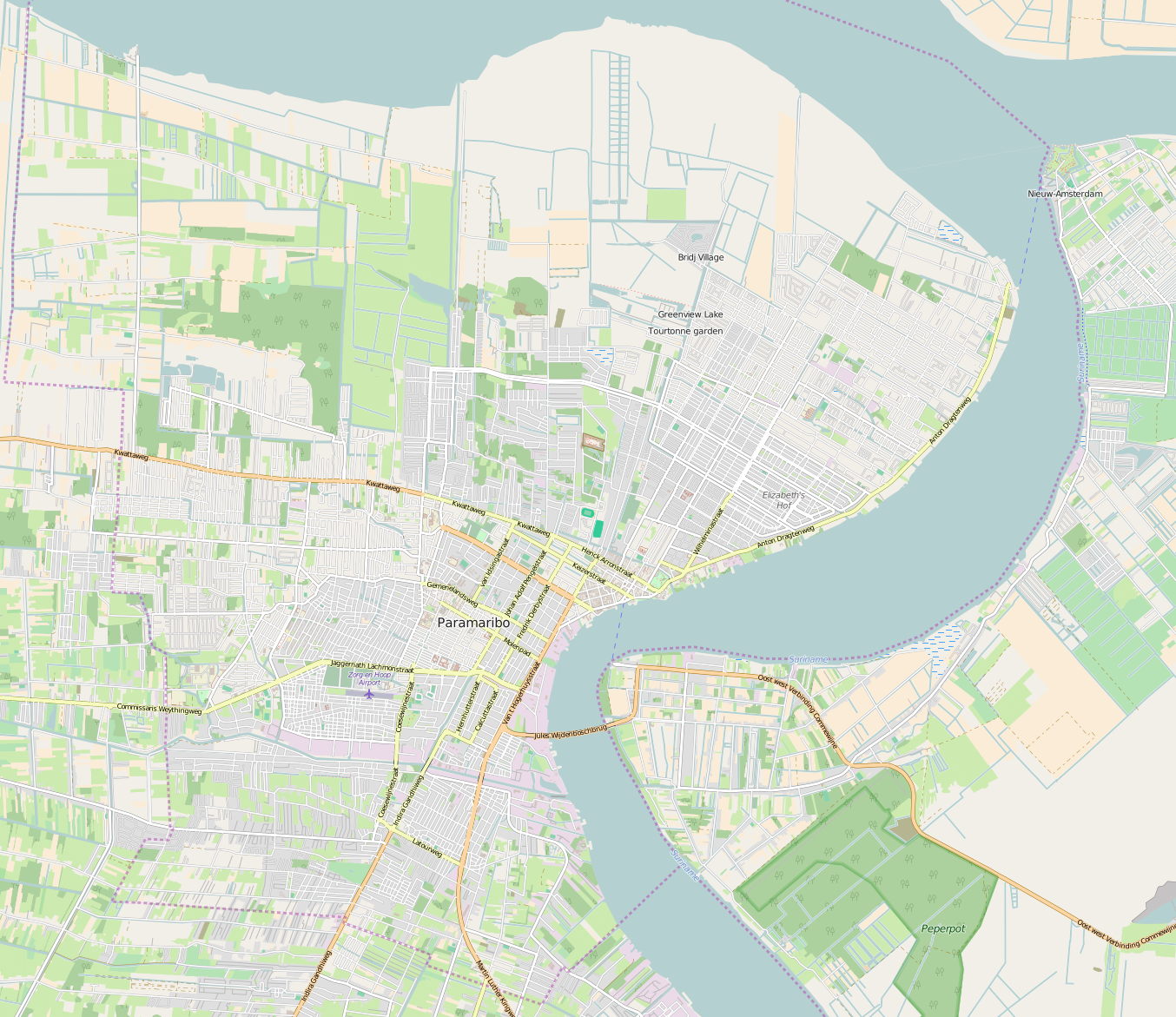
- Location within Paramaribo

Geography
- Location: Paramaribo, Suriname
- Coordinates: 5.835767°N 55.183661°W

Organisation
- Type: Academic
- Affiliated university: Anton de Kom University of Suriname

Services
- Beds: 465

History
- Founded: 9 March 1966

Links
- Website: www.azp.sr
- Lists: Hospitals in Suriname

Academic Hospital Paramaribo (Dutch: Academisch Ziekenhuis Paramaribo or AZP) is a hospital in Paramaribo, Suriname. With 465 beds, it is the largest hospital in Suriname.

== History ==
The hospital was opened on 9 March 1966 as Centraal Ziekenhuis (Central Hospital), but changed its name in 1969 to Academic Hospital when the medical faculty of the Anton de Kom University of Suriname was founded.

== See also ==
- 's Lands Hospitaal, a general hospital in Paramaribo;
- Sint Vincentius Hospital, a Catholic hospital in Paramaribo;
- Diakonessenhuis, a Protestant hospital in Paramaribo.
- Mungra Medisch Centrum, medical centre district Nickerie.
