= List of hospitals in Suriname =

List of hospitals in Suriname include:

- Academic Hospital Paramaribo, Paramaribo
- Diakonessenhuis (Paramaribo), Paramaribo
- Mungra Medical Centre, Nieuw Nickerie
- 's Lands Hospitaal, Paramaribo
- Regional Hospital Wanica, Lelydorp
- Sint Vincentius Hospital, Paramaribo
