= Surinaams Chinees Televisie Station =

SCTV
- Country: Suriname
- Broadcast area: National
- Headquarters: Paramaribo

Programming
- Languages: Mandarin Chinese; Cantonese
- Picture format: 480i (NTSC and ATSC)

Ownership
- Owner: Kong Ngie Tong Sang

History
- Launched: February 2, 2008

Availability

Terrestrial
- UHF: Channel 45

Surinaams Chinees Televisie Station (SCTV) is a Surinamese television station founded in February 2008 by Kong Ngie Tong Sang. The station is located at Kwattaweg in Paramaribo and broadcasts on channel 45.

== History ==
SCTV evolved from the CCTV programming of STVS, the national channel. Standalone broadcasts began in February 2008 The station was founded by Thomson Cheung, the "Godfather of SCTV", where he was also director until 2014; he died in Miami in 2019 at age 65.

Vishmohanie Thomas had a brief career on SCTV before returning to the press.

== Programming ==
The main SCTV channel (analog 45/digital 45.1) broadcasts a mix of programs from mainland China, Hong Kong and Taiwan, as well as TV series from the United States, relays of CCTV-4 and limtied original programming, in Mandarin and Cantonese. Mandarin and Cantonese speakers are its target audience.
