= Guillaume Lo-A-Njoe =

Dutch painter of Surinamese descent

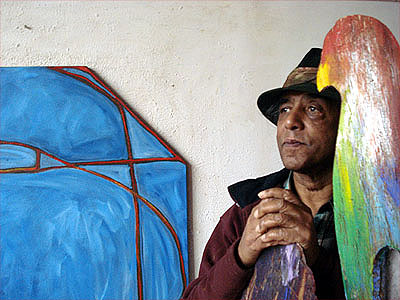
Guillaume in his studio with one of his painted wooden sculptures, to the left part of an eight-sided painting; 2008

Guillaume Theodoor Lo-A-Njoe (Amsterdam, June 25, 1937) is a Dutch painter of Surinamese descent. He is married and has one son. He currently resides and works in Amsterdam where he celebrated his 60th anniversary as an artist in 2019.

== Biography ==
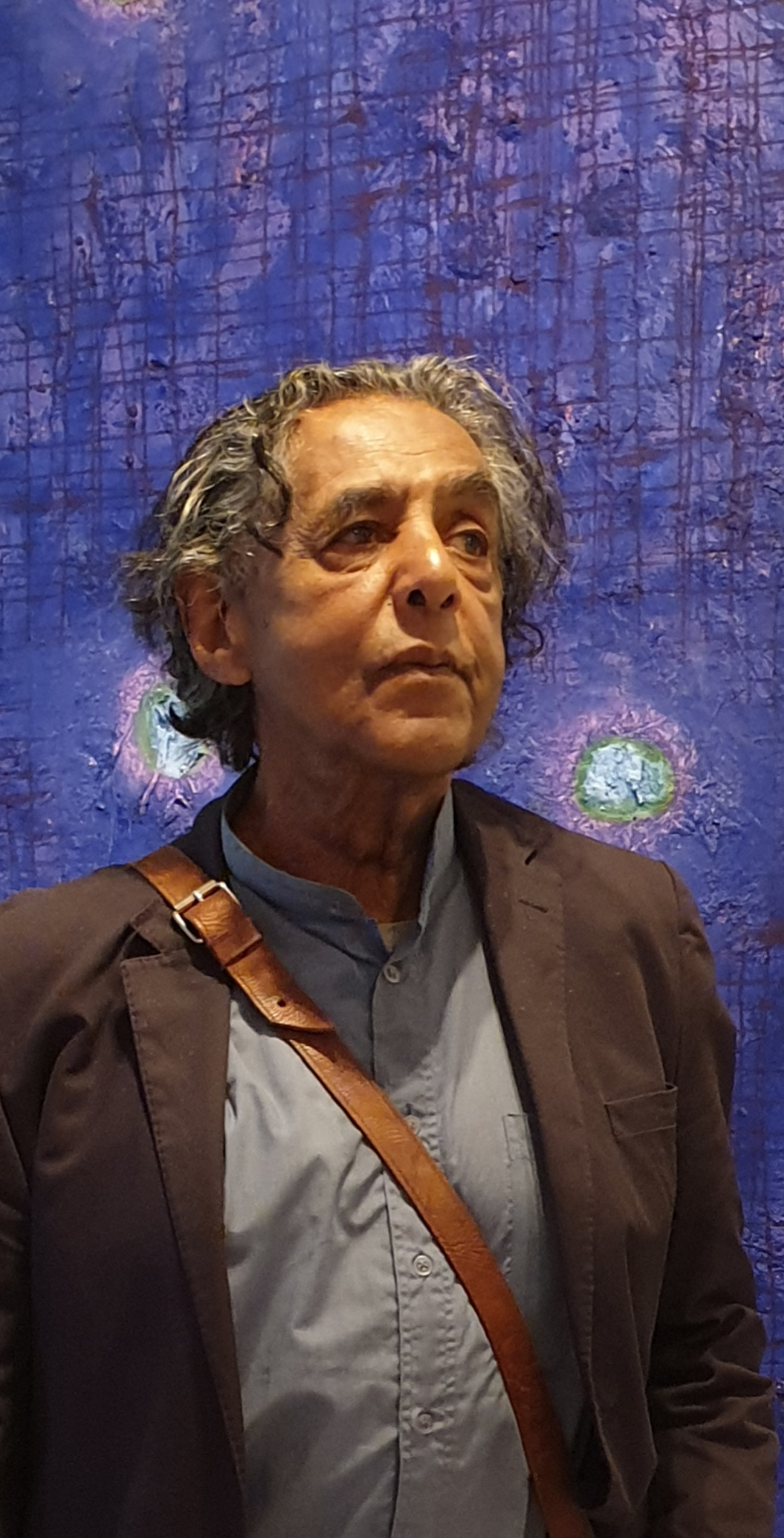

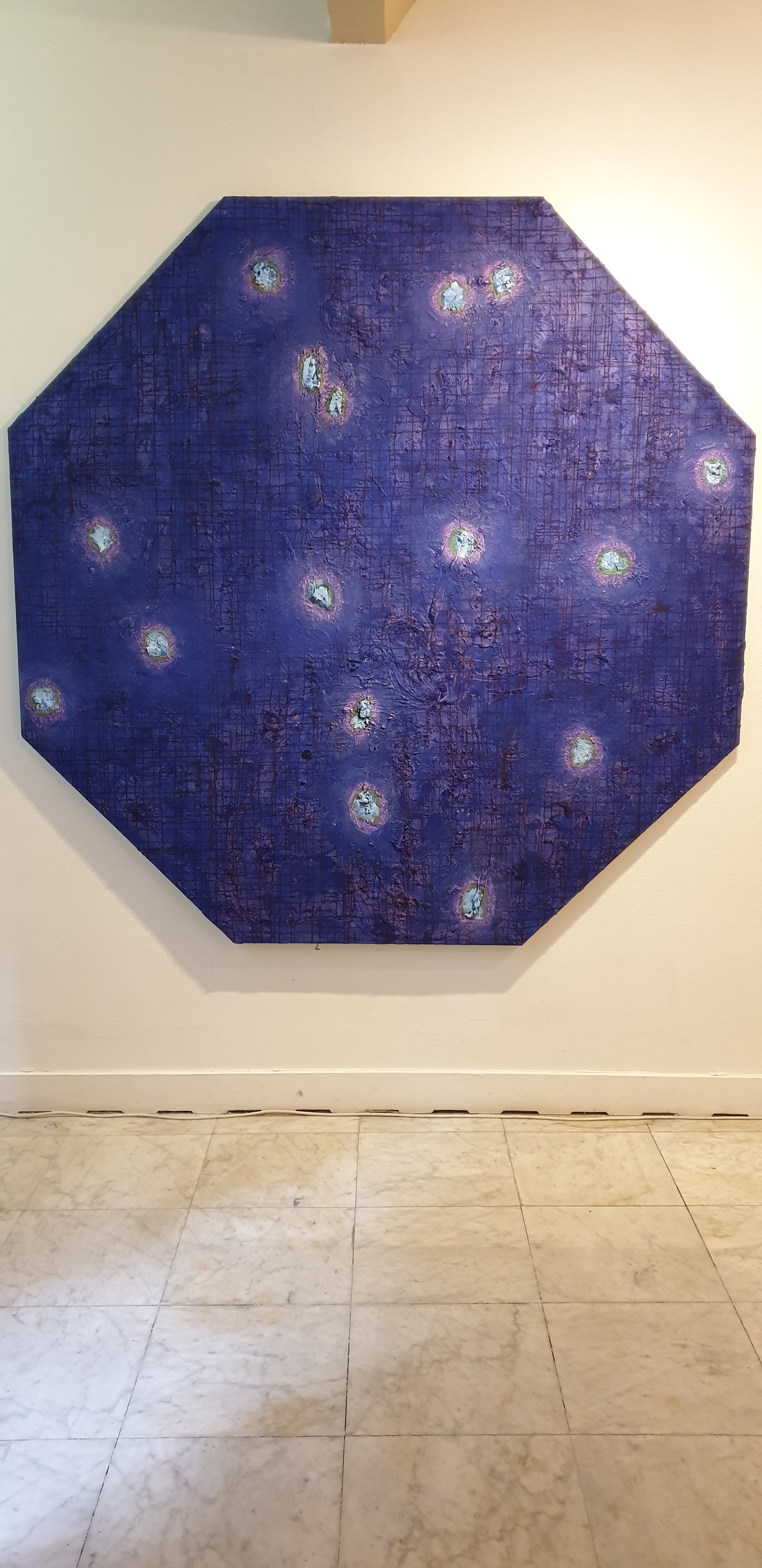

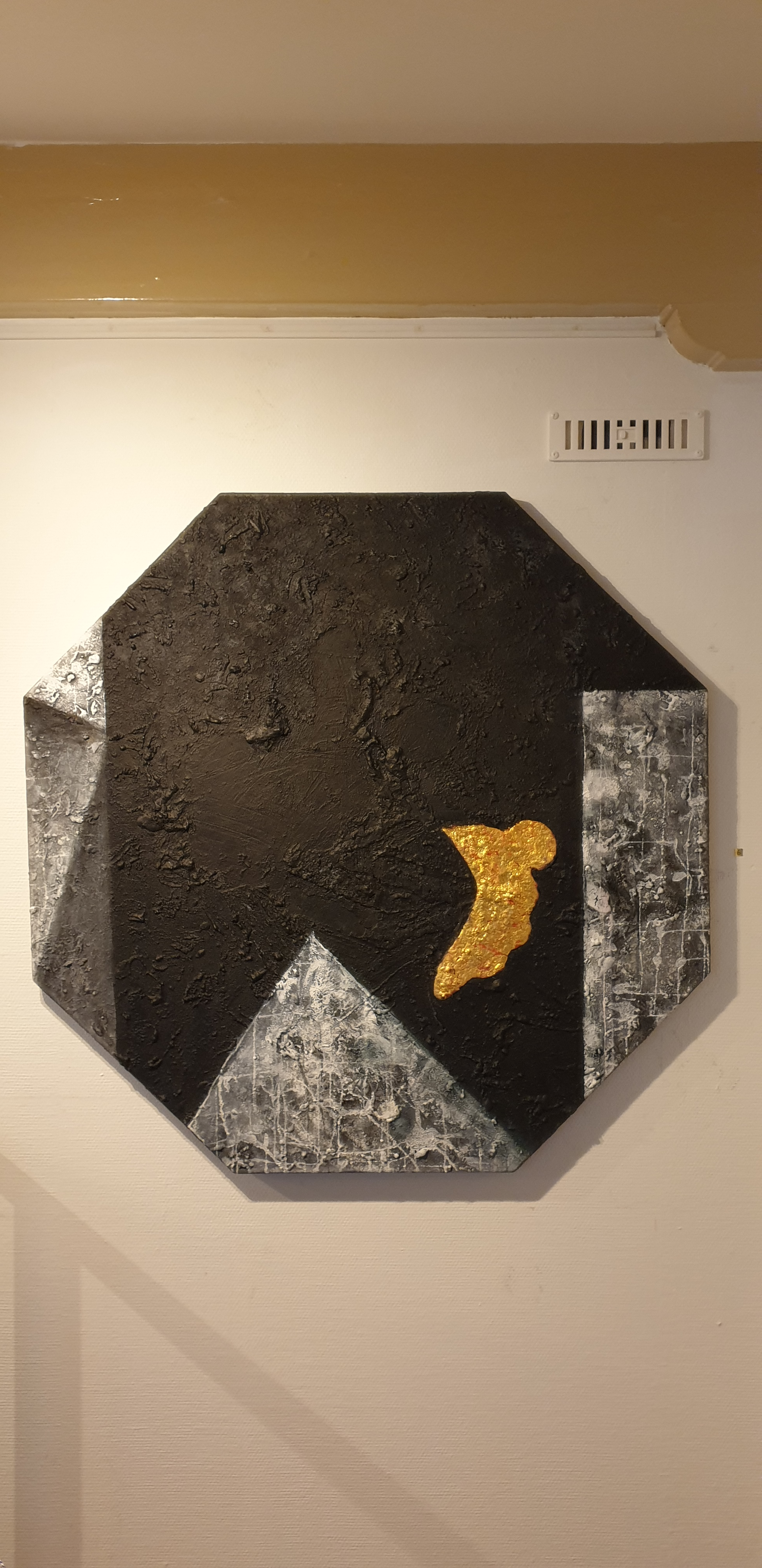

Lo-A-Njoe has Nepalese, Indian and Chinese ancestry. His ancestors moved to Surinam, a former Dutch colony, now known as Suriname. His parents immigrated to the Netherlands in 1937, and Lo-A-Njoe was born in Amsterdam later that year. He lived through the Second World War as a young child. From 1953 to 1958, Lo-A-Njoe studied fine art and painting at the Amsterdam Kunstnijverheidsschool (School of Applied Arts), a predecessor to the Gerrit Rietveld Academie.

In 1958, Lo-A-Njoe received the Koninklijke Subsidie voor de Vrije Schilderkunst (Royal Subsidy for Fine Art Painting) to encourage young promising artists. Later that year, he had his first exhibition at Café Eijlders: a large venue at the Leidseplein in Amsterdam, which is famous for its artistic ambiance and clientele.

During the 1960s and 70s, he made many study trips in Europe and lived in the United States and Suriname. He also travelled to India, Morocco, Mexico and the Caribbean for inspiration. Lo-A-Njoe's art is present in museums worldwide: the Municipal Museum of Mexico City; Stedelijk Museum in Amsterdam; Cobra Museum for Modern Art in Amstelveen; Kunstmuseum Den Haag in The Hague; Surinaams Museum in Paramaribo; het Curaçaosch Museum in the Dutch Caribbean; the state art collection of the Netherlands (Rijksdienst voor het Cultureel Erfgoed); among others.

Besides having a presence in museums, Lo-A-Njoe's art can be found in many private collections worldwide and is regularly put up for auction at prestigious auction houses such as AAG (Arts & Antiques Group) or Christie's and Sotheby's.

Lo-A-Njoe also works as a commissioned artist for private and public commissions. In Amsterdam, two of his commissioned artworks can be seen in public space. He designed a plaque to commemorate Surinamese nationalist and WWII resistance fighter Anton de Kom, who died in a concentration camp. The plaque was unveiled by Lo-A-Njoe on 24 November 1990 at the Anton de Kom square in Amsterdam. In 1991, a monument was unveiled in memory of the victims of Surinam Airways Flight 764, which crashed on 7 June 1989 during en route to Paramaribo-Zanderij International Airport, killing 176 of the 187 on board, making it the deadliest aviation disaster in Suriname's history. In 2008, Lo-A-Njoe celebrated his 70th birthday and his 50th anniversary as an artist. This special jubilee was enough reason for a large retrospective where he showed works spanning his entire career which still continues to date. Lo-A-Njoe currently lives and works in Amsterdam-Noord where he and his wife Lydia continue to receive guests and prospective clients and prepare exhibitions. A new personal website features his motto: 'The beauty of a painting is that it makes no sound.' Lo-A-Njoe states that, according to him, 'Creating bears witness to my presence on Earth.' In 2019, Guillaume celebrated his 60th anniversary as an artist with large retrospective shows, like the 'Arti et Amicitia' art collective in Amsterdam in July 2019, the oldest artist association and club in Amsterdam.

== Art and Method ==
Inspired by COBRA during his education and formation as an artist in the early 1950s, Lo-A-Njoe developed a style of expression that follows that of the COBRA movement and can be characterised by a powerful and colourful palette. His style is akin to expressionism and can be counted to post-COBRA, where, over the years, Lo-A-Njoe's art has evolved into a dynamic expressive style with his unique signature. His later oil paintings are built up from thick layers of paint, to the extent they sometimes almost become sculptural in appearance. Oskar Kokoschka and Marc Chagall are among his sources of inspiration. His international multicultural background, which combines Dutch, Surinamese, Indian, Nepalese and Chinese traditions, also plays a role. In his work, one can perceive influences of the native cultures and local nature he encountered on his travels in Asia and the Amazon rainforest in South America, as can be seen in his wooden totems and wooden sculptures, for instance.

Overall, Lo-A-Njoe stands in a long Dutch tradition of painters. Like the old masters, such as Rembrandt, Lo-A-Njoe prepares his canvasses thoroughly before beginning actual artistic composition. He fixes his canvases on a self-built wooden frame and uses self-made tempera as a grounder and organic glue as a binder to prepare the painting surface. With this procedure, the artwork is already being born bit by bit according to his experience, which he shares on a website devoted to his 2008 jubilee exhibition.

Next, the oil paint is applied, which he makes from real pigments. His method of painting is direct, with emotion and temperament and full of expression. When working, Lo-A-Njoe enters into a physical dialogue with the canvas. Lo-A-Njoe's works of art include paintings, mostly oil on canvas, gouaches, wooden sculptures and objects, and screen prints.
