= Frits Tjong-Ayong =

Surinamese physician and hospital director

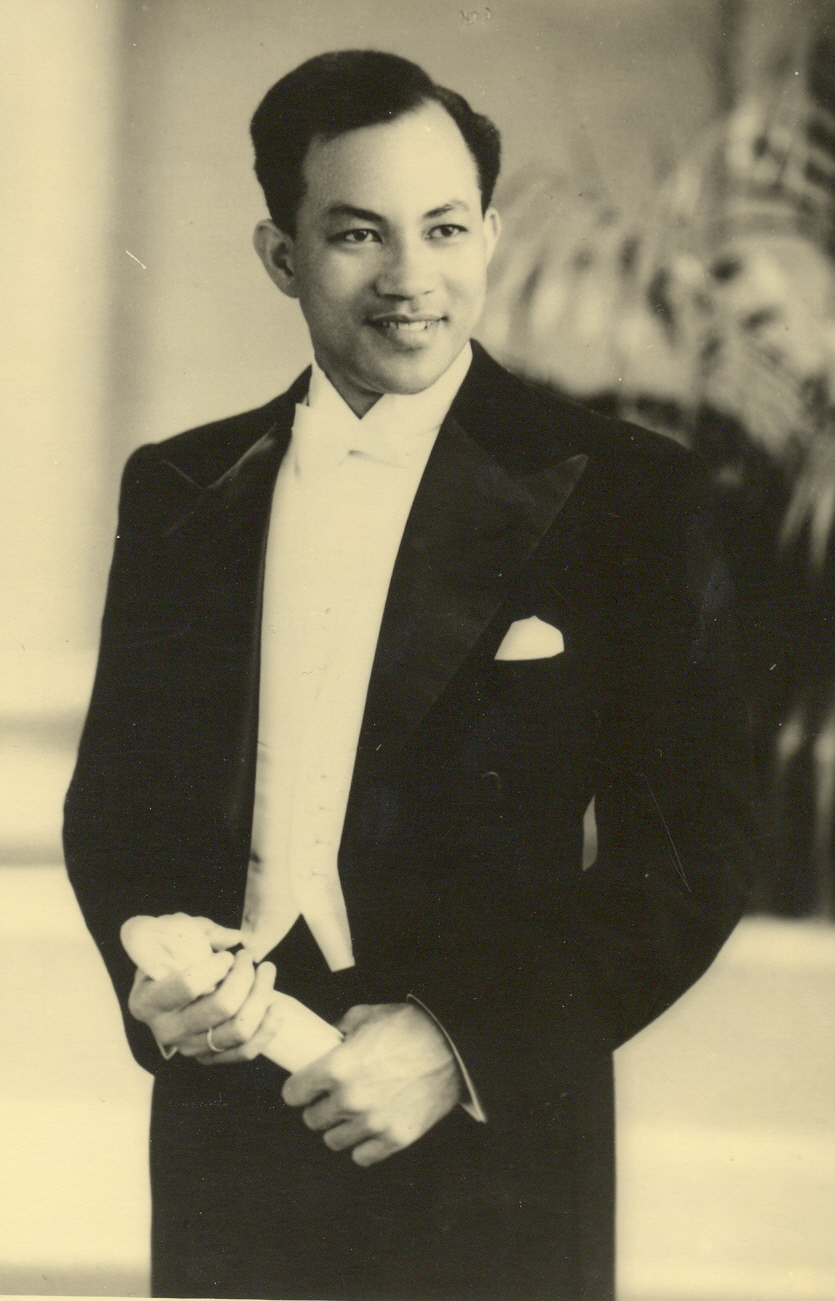
- Frits Tjong-Ayong at Groningen in 1949
- Born: Frits André Tjong Ayong; January 13, 1912; Paramaribo, Suriname
- Died: December 23, 1993 (aged 81); Paramaribo, Suriname
- Other name: Frits Tjong Ayong
- Occupations: Surgeon and hospital director
- Spouse: Paulina Comvalius (m. 1937)
- Children: 5

Academic background
- Education: University of Groningen
- Thesis: Prostatectomia retropubica extra-vesicalis volgens van Stockum-Millin (1949)
- Doctoral advisor: Leendert Eerland

Frits André Tjong Ayong (Paramaribo, January 13, 1912 – Paramaribo, December 23, 1993; also known as Frits Tjong-Ayong) was a Surinamese surgeon and urologist. He was the father of writer and poet Carry-Ann Tjong Ayong and uncle of composer and pianist Majoie Hajary.

== Biography ==
He was born into the Tjong Ayong family as the youngest son of Willem Tjong Ayong and Carolina Esse. He completed his medical training at the University of Groningen under Professor Leendert Eerland, under whom he received his doctorate as a surgeon and urologist on April 4, 1949. His thesis was Prostatectomia retropubica extra-vesicalis volgens van Stockum-Millin ("Prostatectomia retropubica extra-vesicalis according to van Stockum-Millin"). One of his papers was "Suriname heeft behoefte aan volledig en modern opgeleide specialisten" ("Suriname needs fully and modernly trained specialists"). In 1937, he married Paulina Comvalius, daughter of Samuel Henriquez de Granada. They had five children.

From August 1, 1938, to 1981, Tjong Ayong was the director of the Sint Vincentius Hospital in Paramaribo. He was the first hospital director of Chinese descent in Suriname. Under his leadership, many improvements were implemented, training programs for nurses and midwives were established, and expansions were made.

== Legacy ==
He died at the age of 81 in Paramaribo. Erwin de Vries made a bust of him, which stands in the hall of the Sint Vincentius Hospital, and painted him several times. At Flora resort in Paramaribo District, Dr. F. Tjong Ayong Street is named after him.
