= Caribbean Series (monograph series) =

Academic book series by Brill

The Caribbean Series is an academic book series published by Brill in collaboration with the KITLV. It features monographs and edited volumes on the Caribbean, including the archipelago and related continental regions in the Americas, exploring historical, cultural, and diasporic connections.

The series is edited by Sophie Maríñez, a professor of modern languages, cultures, and literature at the Borough of Manhattan Community College, a Hispanic-Serving Institution (HSI).

It covers among others arts, humanities, and social sciences, addressing themes such as decolonization, diasporic identities, Afro Caribbean and indigenous traditions, race, class, gender, and LGBTQ+, migration, the legacies of imperialism, and the effects of neo-liberal policies. The series complements KITLV's other publications, including the New West Indian Guide.

== Volumes (in selection) ==
Among the published volumes are:

- 1. The American Takeover: Industrial Emergence and Alcoa's Expansion in Guyana and Surinam 1914-1921. Carlo Lamur. 1983.
- 2. Werken onder de boom: Dynamiek en informele sector: de situatie in Groot-Paramaribo. Paul van Gelder. 2025.
- 3. South American and Caribbean Petroglyphs. C.N. Dubelaar. 1986.
- 7. The Netherlands Antilles and Aruba: A Research Guide. Ingrid Koulen, G. Oostindie. 1987.
- 8. The British West Indies during the American Revolution. Selwyn H.H. Carrington. 1988.
- 13. Surinaams contrast: Roofbouw en overleven in een Caraïbische plantagekolonie, 1750-1863. A.A. van Stipriaan. 2015.
- 14. Wolves from the Sea: Readings in the Anthropology of the Native Caribbean. Bandherausgeber: Neil L. Whitehead. 2024.
- 15. Fifty Years Later: Antislavery, Capitalism, Modernity, and Antislavery in the Dutch Orbit. Bandherausgeber: Gert Oostindie. 2025.
- 18. Illicit Riches: Dutch Trade in the Caribbean, 1648-1795. Wim Klooster. 2024.
- 19. Tussen autonomie en onafhankelijkheid: Nederlands-Surinaamse betrekkingen, 1954-1961. Peter Meel. 2024.
- 21. Ik heb Suriname altijd liefgehad: Het leven van de Javaan Salikin Hardjo. Klaas Breunissen. 2001.
- 24. De rechten van inheemse volken en marrons in Suriname. Ellen-Rose Kambel, Fergus MacKay. 2003.
- 25. De kleur van mijn eiland: Aruba, Bonaire, Curaçao (2 vols.): Ideologie en schrijven in het Papiamentu sinds 1863. Aart G. Broek. 2006.
- 26. Een leven in de West: Van Raders en zijn werkzaamheden op Curacao. W.E. Renkema. 2009.
- 27. In Search of a Path: An Analysis of the Foreign Policy of Suriname from 1975 to 1991. Roger Janssen. 2011.
- 28. Creole Jews: Negotiating Community in Colonial Suriname. Wieke Vink. 2010.
- 29. Een zwarte vrijstaat in Suriname: De Okaanse samenleving in de achttiende eeuw. H.U.E. Thoden van Velzen, Wilhelmina van Velzen. 2011.
- 30. Curaçao in the Age of Revolutions, 1795-1800. Bandherausgeber:innen: Wim Klooster, Geert Oostindie. 2011.
- 31. Lachen, huilen, bevrijden: De weerspiegeling van de Surinaamse samenleving in het werk van het Doe-theater, 1970-1983. Annika Ockhorst, Thea Doelwijt. 2012.
- 32. Een zwarte vrijstaat in Suriname (deel 2): De Okaanse samenleving in de negentiende en twintigste eeuw. Wilhelmina van Velzen, H.U.E. Thoden van Velzen. 2013.
- 33. Geweld in de West: Een militaire geschiedenis van de Nederlandse Atlantische wereld, 1600-1800. Bandherausgeber:innen: Victor Enthoven, Henk den Heijer, Han R. Jordaan. 2013.
- 34. In and Out of Suriname: Language, Mobility and Identity. Herausgeber:innen: Eithne B. Carlin, Isabelle Léglise, Bettina Migge, Paul B. Tjon Sie Fat. 2014.
- 35. Marie Vieux Chauvet's Theatres: Thought, Form, and Performance of Revolt. Bandherausgeber:innen: Christian Flaugh, Lena Taub Robles. 2019.
- 36. Beyond the Legacy of the Missionaries and East Indians: The Impact of the Presbyterian Church in the Caribbean. Jerome Teelucksingh. 2019.
- 37. The Things of Others: Ethnographies, Histories, and Other Artefacts. Olívia Maria Gomes da Cunha. 2020.
- 38. The Humble Ethnographer: Lodewijk Schmidt's Accounts from Three Voyages in Amazonian Guiana. Renzo S. Duin. 2020.
- 39. When Creole and Spanish Collide: Language and Cultural Contact in the Caribbean. Bandherausgeber:innen: Glenda-Alicia Leung, Miki Loschky. 2021.
- 40. Monty Howell. Milestones of Life among Rastafari. Linda Ainouche. 2021.
- 41. Caribbean Letters: The Circulation of Information in the Spanish Monarchy during the Bourbon Reforms. Rocio Moreno Cabanillas, Übersetzer: David Govantes Edwards. 2024.
- 42. 26 Years a Slave: Juan Miranda and Other “Spanish Negroes” in Colonial New York. Beatriz Carolina Peña. 2025.

== See also ==
- Portal:Caribbean
- Caribbean Writers Series (Heinemann)
