= Mungra Medical Centre =

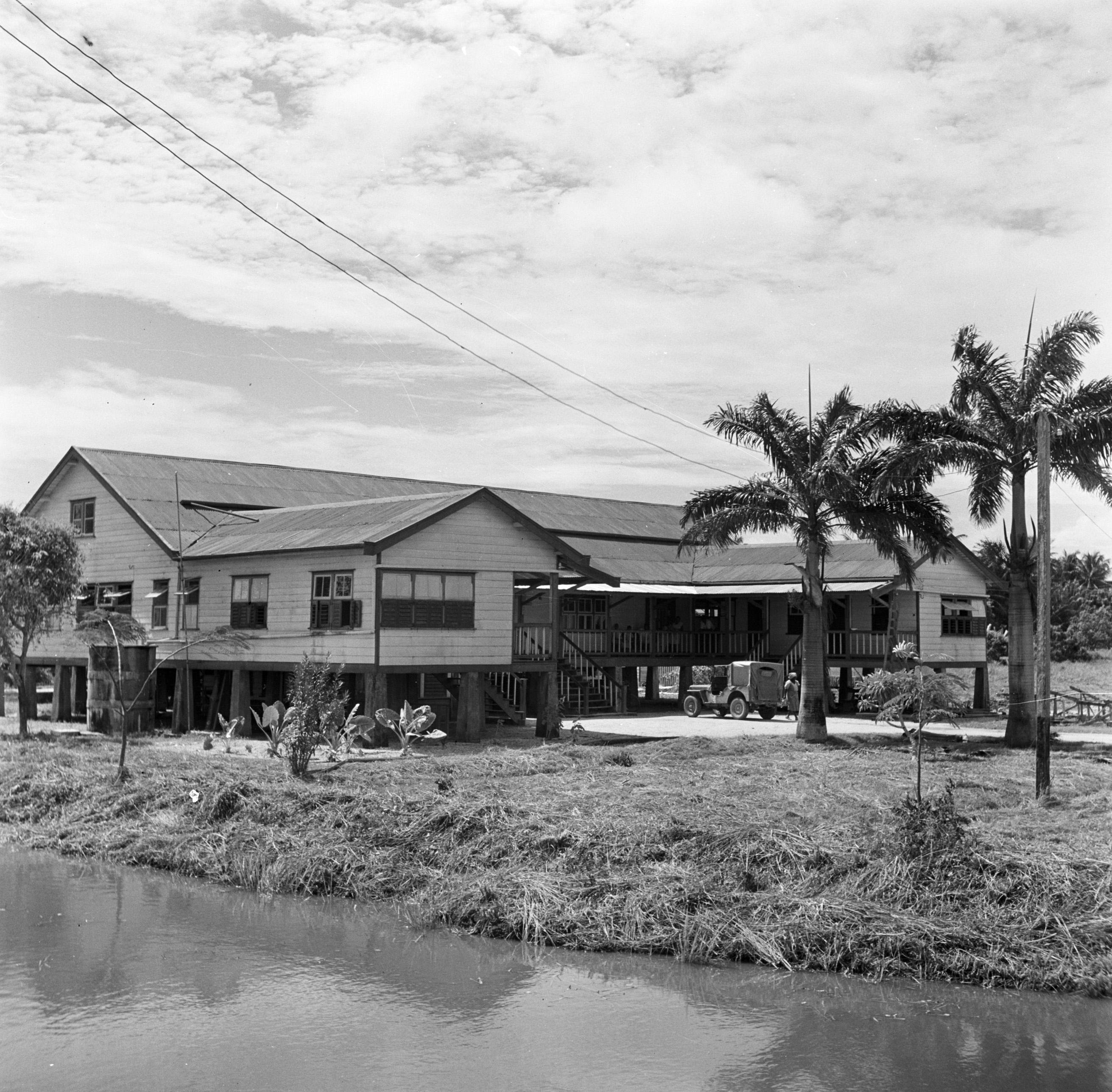
- 's Lands Ziekenhuis Nickerie (1947)

Geography
- Location: Nieuw-Nickerie, Suriname
- Coordinates: 5.940542°N 56.986842°W

Services
- Beds: 100

History
- Founded: 15 January 1959

Links
- Website: www.szn.sr
- Lists: Hospitals in Suriname

Mungra Medical Centre (Dutch: Mungra Medisch Centrum or MMC) is a hospital in Nieuw-Nickerie, Suriname. It was the first hospital in Suriname outside of Paramaribo.

== History ==
On 31 March 1907, the government set up a commission to upgrade the infirmary in Nickerie to a hospital. This became known as the 's Lands Ziekenhuis Nickerie, which was located in Margarethenburg, not too far from Nieuw-Nickerie. Due to its remote location, small size and problems with flooding, it was decided in the 1950s to close it and open a new hospital on the Annastraat in Nieuw-Nickerie. The first stone was laid on 25 July 1956 and the hospital was eventually opened on 15 January 1959.

On 7 March 1994, the hospital was named Lachmipersad Mungra Regional Hospital Nickerie after Lachmipersad Mungra, a physician and member of parliament from Nickerie. On 25 May 2017, the hospital was renamed to Mungra Medical Centre. On 8 December 2017, the MMC together with the Ministry of Defence will be setting up five outpatient clinics in Kalebaskreek, Donderskamp, Corneliskondre, and Kabalebo.

== Services ==
The hospital specializes in gynecology, surgery, internal medicine, pediatrics, radiology, urology, psychology, otorhinolaryngology. The patient will be referred to Paramaribo for ophthalmology, orthopedic surgery, dermatology, psychiatry, and neurology.
