= China–Suriname relations =

- China: Suriname

China-Suriname relations are the bilateral relations between the Republic of Suriname and the People's Republic of China. China has an embassy in Paramaribo. Suriname has an embassy in Beijing.

== History ==
In 1976, China and Suriname officially established diplomatic relations between the two countries. Suriname engaged with the Belt and Road Initiative by signing a memorandum of understanding, which made it the second Caribbean country to sign.

Suriname joined the Belt and Road Initiative (BRI) in 2018.

In June 2020, Suriname was one of 53 countries that backed the Hong Kong national security law at the United Nations.

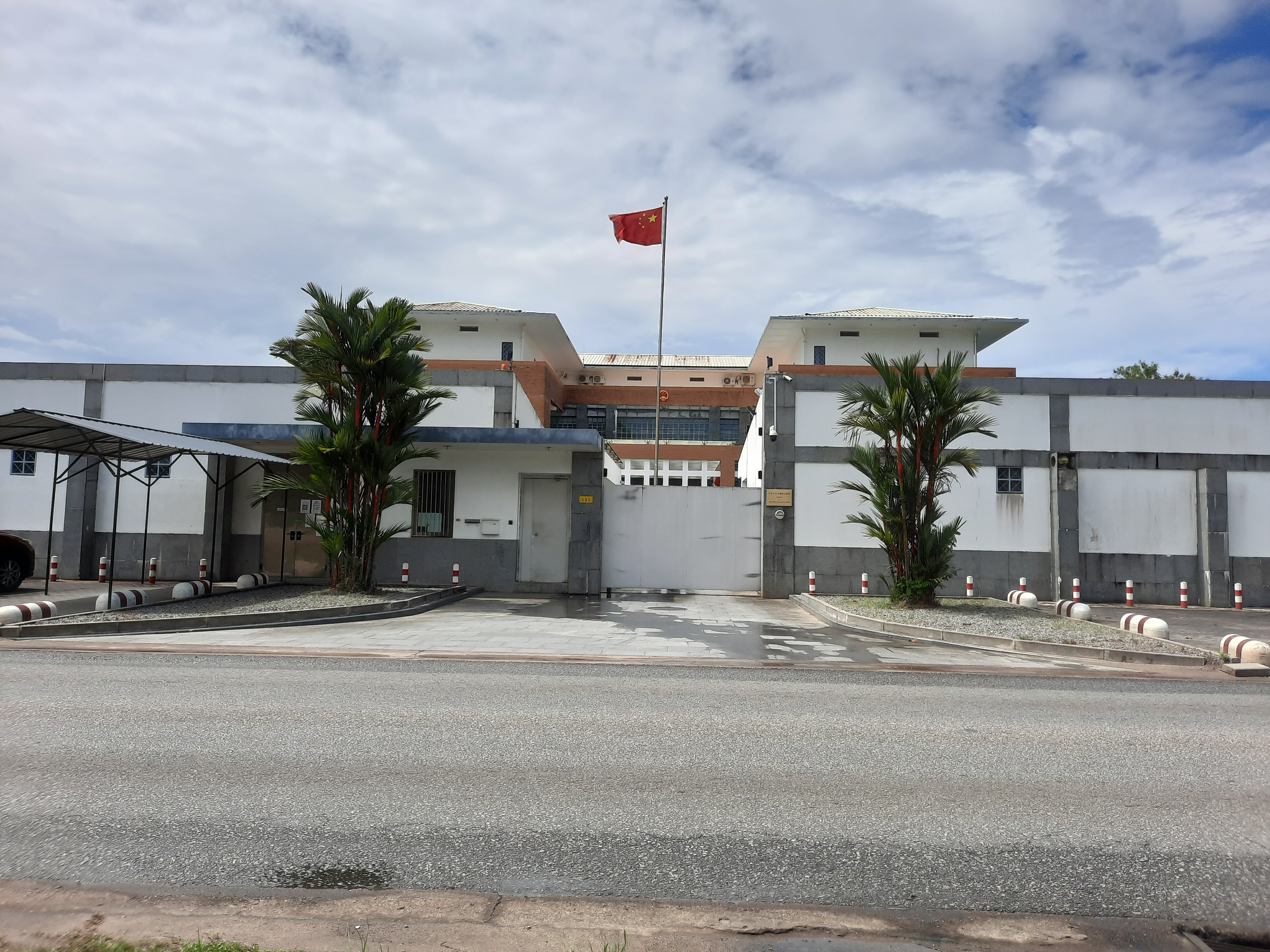
Embassy of China in Paramaribo

== See also ==
- Chinese Surinamese
- Sino-Caribbean relations
