= 's Lands Hospitaal =

- Government of Suriname
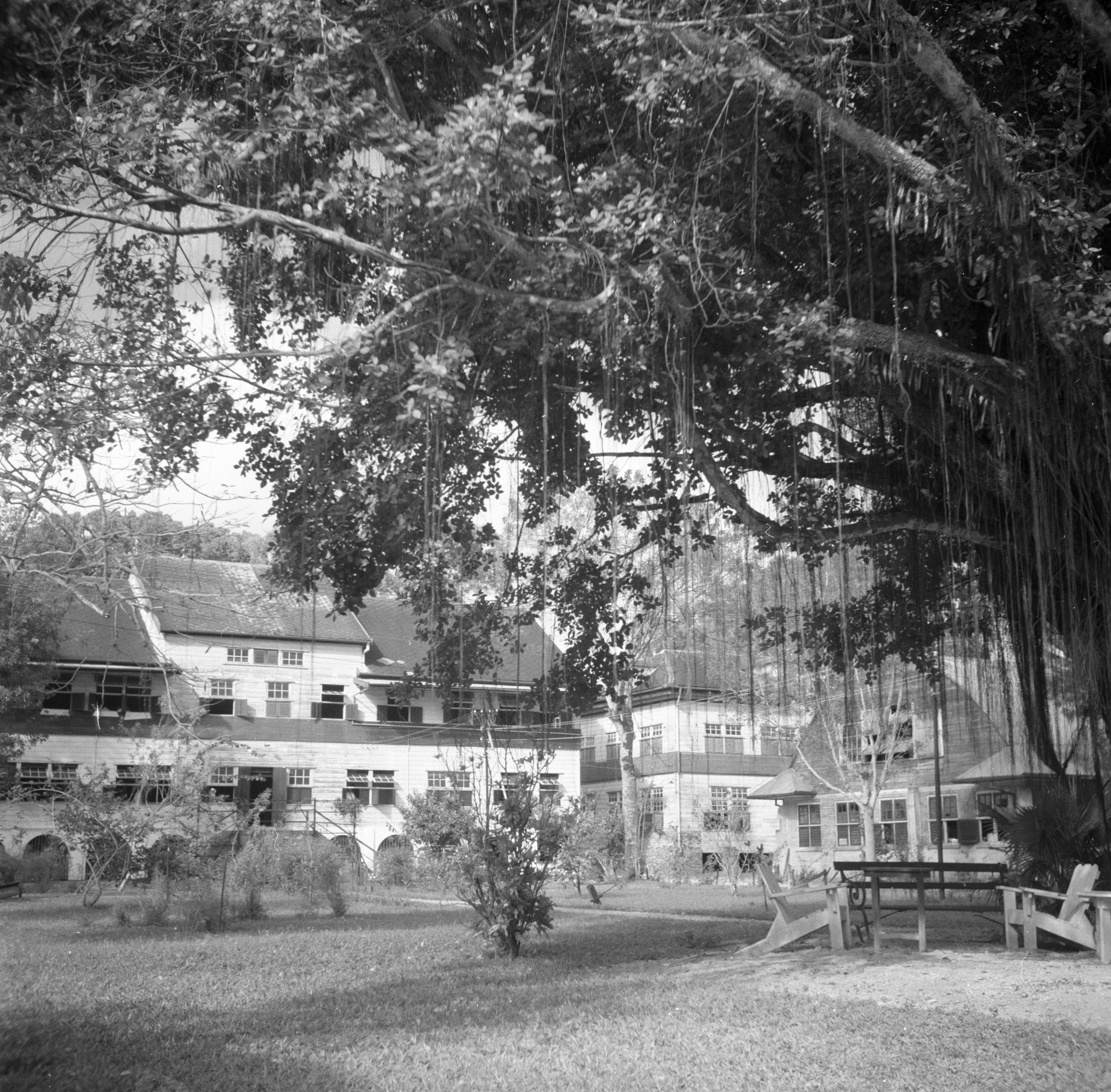
- 1947 photo

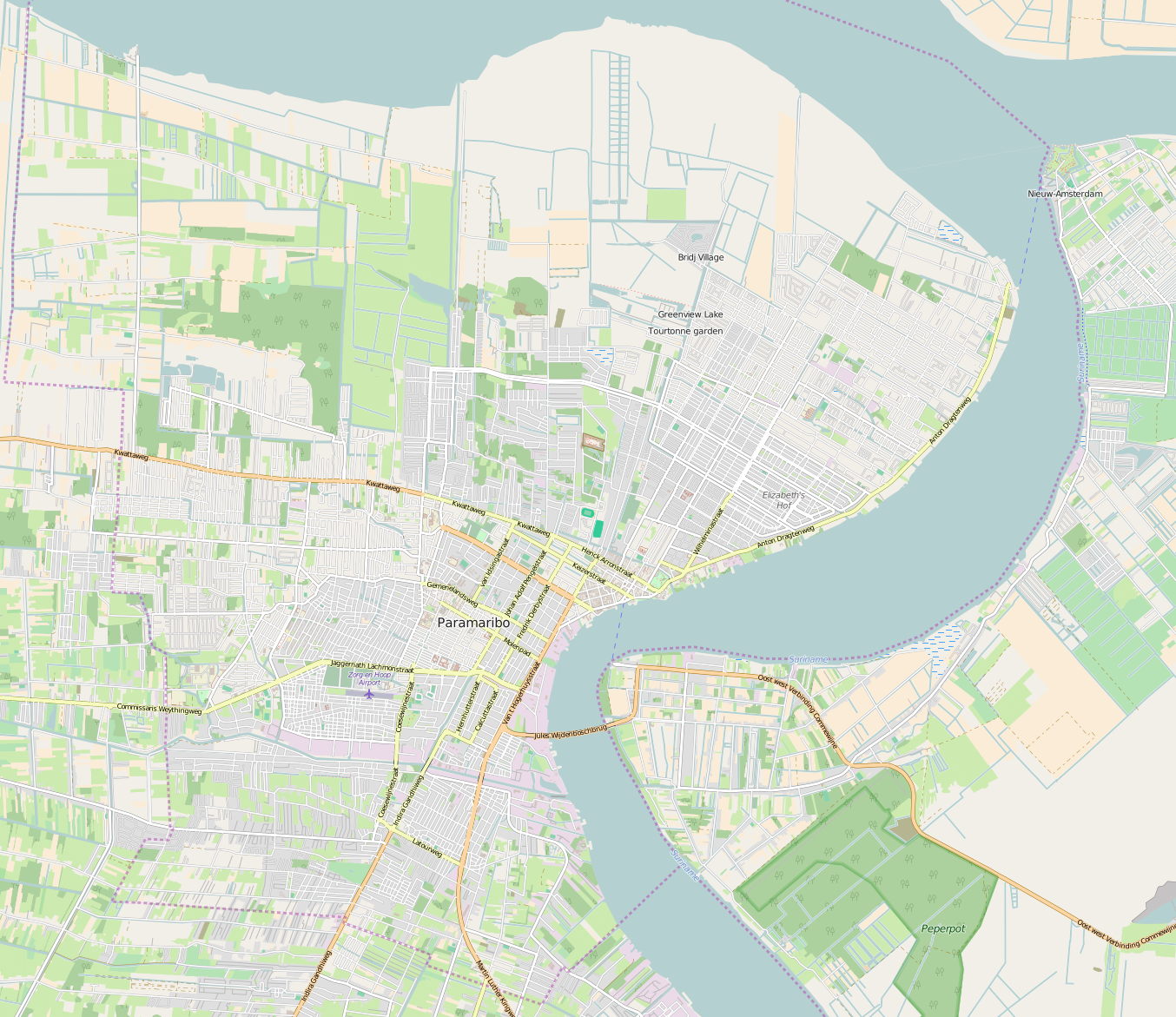
- Location within Paramaribo

Geography
- Location: Tourtonnelaan 3, Paramaribo, Suriname
- Coordinates: 5.830591°N 55.156351°W

Organisation
- Type: General

Services
- Beds: 310

History
- Founded: 1760 (military hospital); 1934 (general hospital)

Links
- Website: www.slandshospitaal.sr
- Lists: Hospitals in Suriname

's Lands Hospitaal is a hospital in Paramaribo, Suriname. The hospital started as a military hospital when it was established in 1760. In 1934, the hospital was transformed into a general hospital and renamed 's Lands Hospitaal. The hospital has specialized in neonatology and pediatrics. In 2015, an intensive care unit was opened.

== See also ==
- Academic Hospital Paramaribo, the university hospital of Paramaribo;
- Sint Vincentius Hospital, a Catholic hospital in Paramaribo;
- Diakonessenhuis, a Protestant hospital in Paramaribo.
