= Sint Vincentius Hospital =

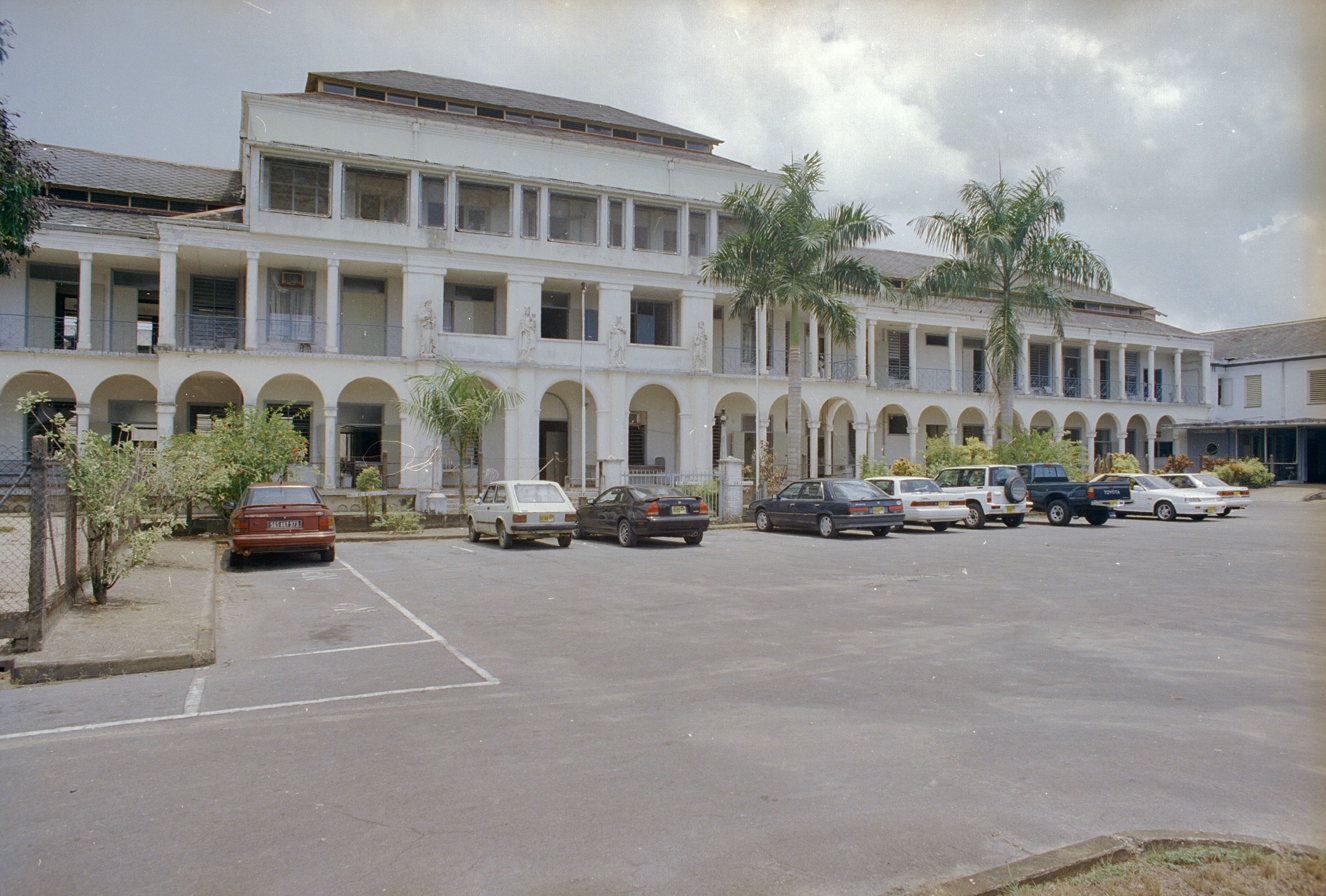

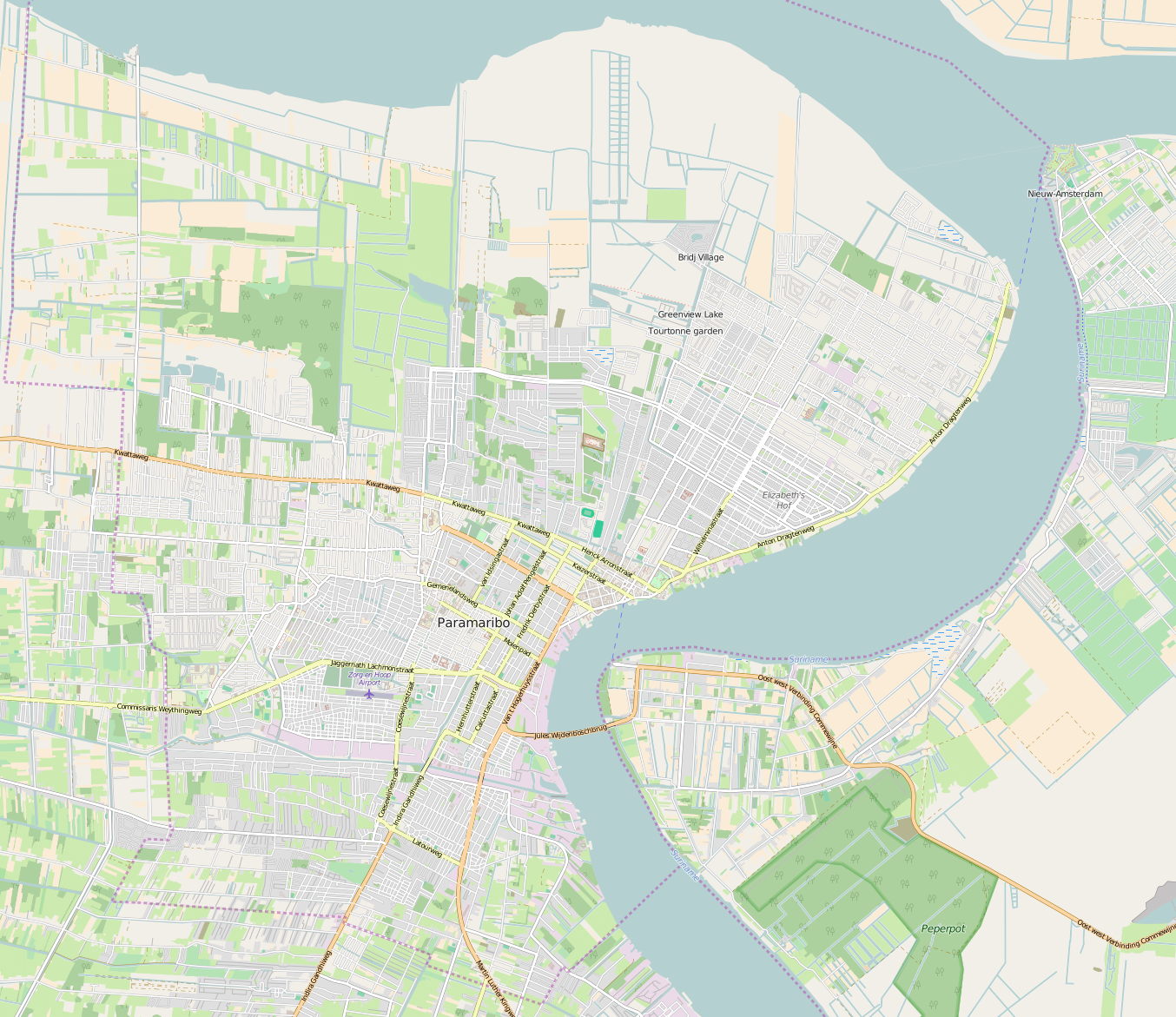
- Location within Paramaribo

Geography
- Location: Paramaribo, Suriname
- Coordinates: 5.831786°N 55.152869°W

History
- Founded: 1916

Links
- Website: www.svzsuriname.org
- Lists: Hospitals in Suriname

Sint Vincentius Hospital (Dutch: Sint Vincentiusziekenhuis) is a Catholic hospital in Paramaribo, Suriname, named after Saint Vincentius. It started as a Catholic charity but later became a state run hospital.

== History ==
The hospital has its roots in a congregation of Sisters of Love from Tilburg who were deployed to Suriname in 1894. Out of the infirmary they started, the Sint Vincentius Hospital was founded in 1916, originally with a capacity of 70 beds. With the passing of time the hospital became more professional and shifted its focus from charity to professional medical care. The hospital was expanded in 1964, 1976 and 1978.

From August 1, 1938 to 1981, Frits Tjong-Ayong was the director of the hospital. He was the first hospital director of Chinese descent in Suriname. Under his leadership, many improvements were implemented, training programs for nurses and midwives were established, and expansions were made.

By 1974, the hospital foundation running the hospital was still part of the Roman Catholic Church. In that year, the Diocese of Paramaribo transferred the hospital from a church body into a local secular foundation with a board of lay people. It is now affiliated to the Suriname Ministry of Health. The hospital later opened a medical school on campus to give students an opportunity to study attached to a live hospital. In 2019, the hospital went on strike but it was resolved when the staff were paid a last payment they were owed. During the COVID-19 pandemic in Suriname, Sint Vincentius Hospital received a donation of medical equipment from Japan.

== See also ==
- Academic Hospital Paramaribo, a university hospital of Paramaribo;
- 's Lands Hospitaal, a general hospital in Paramaribo
- Diakonessenhuis, a Protestant hospital in Paramaribo
