= South America =

Continent

- Area: 17,840,000 km^{2} (6,890,000 sq mi) (4th)
- Population: ▲434,254,119 (2021; 5th)
- Population density: 21.4/km^{2} (56.0/sq mi)
- GDP (PPP): $7.61 trillion (2022 est; 5th)
- GDP (nominal): $3.62 trillion (2022 est; 4th)
- GDP per capita: $8,340 (2022 est; 5th)
- Ethnic groups: White Latin Americans (Note: Europeans and West Asians); Indigenous peoples; Afro–Latin Americans; Asian Latin Americans; Multiracial people; Mestizo (European and Indigenous); Mulatto (European and Sub-Saharan African); Pardo (European, Indigenous, Sub-Saharan African); Zambo (Indigenous and Sub-Saharan African)
- Religions: 90.0% Christianity; 67.4% Catholicism; 22.6% Protestantism; 1.0% other Christian; 7.0% no religion; 1.3% Spiritism; 0.4% Islam; 0.3% Judaism; 1.0% other/unspecified
- Demonym: South American
- Countries: 12: Argentina; Bolivia; Brazil; Chile; Colombia; Ecuador; Guyana; Paraguay; Peru; Suriname; Uruguay; Venezuela
- Dependencies: External (1–5): Aruba (Note: Sometimes included. Physiographically a part of South America, but geopolitically a part of North America. Aruba is a member nation of ODESUR.) (Netherlands); Bouvet Island (Note: Occasionally included. An isolated volcanic island near the boundary between the African Plate and the Antarctic Plate, Bouvet Island is biogeographically and geologically associated with Antarctica. Despite being closer to Antarctica and Africa geographically, the United Nations geoscheme has included Bouvet Island in South America instead.) (Norway); Curaçao (Note: Sometimes included. Physiographically a part of South America, but geopolitically a part of North America. Curaçao is a member nation of ODESUR.) (Netherlands); Falkland Islands (United Kingdom); South Georgia and the South Sandwich Islands (Note: Geologically, South Georgia Island and the southernmost portion of mainland South America are both on the Scotia Plate, while the South Sandwich Islands are on the nearby Sandwich Plate. Biogeographically and hydrologically, South Georgia and the South Sandwich Islands are associated with Antarctica. The United Nations geoscheme has included the disputed territory in South America.) (United Kingdom); Internal (1–3): Ascension Island (Note: Occasionally included. An isolated volcanic island on the South American Plate, Ascension Island is geologically a part of South America, but geopolitically a part of Africa.) (United Kingdom); Bonaire (Note: Sometimes included. Physiographically a part of South America, but geopolitically a part of North America.) (Netherlands); French Guiana (France)
- Languages: Spanish; Portuguese; English; French; Dutch; Aymara; Guaraní; Mapudungun; Quechua; Wayuu; Sranan Tongo; many others
- Time zone: UTC−02:00 to UTC−05:00
- Largest cities: Largest cities: São Paulo; Lima; Bogotá; Rio de Janeiro; Santiago; Caracas; Buenos Aires; Salvador; Brasília; Fortaleza
- UN M49 codes: 005 – South America; 419 – Latin America and the Caribbean; 019 – Americas; 001 – World

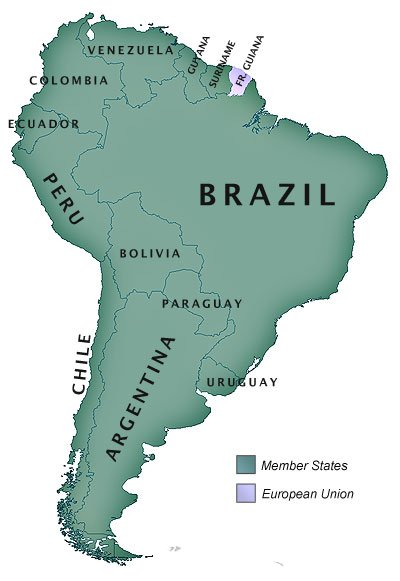
Scheme for geographical regions and subregions used by the United Nations Statistics Division

South America is a continent (Note: In some parts of the world, for example, Latin America, Romance-speaking Europe, and Iran, South America is viewed as a subcontinent of the Americas (a single continent named America). However, in many countries with English as an official language, it is considered a continent; see Americas (terminology).) entirely in the Western Hemisphere (Note: Except Bouvet Island, which has occasionally been included as a part of South America.) and mostly in the Southern Hemisphere, with a considerably smaller portion in the Northern Hemisphere. It can also be described as the southern subregion of the Americas.

South America is bordered on the west by the Pacific Ocean, on the north and east by the Atlantic Ocean, and on the south by the Drake Passage; North America, the Caribbean Sea lying to the northwest, and the Antarctic Circle, Antarctica, and the Antarctic Peninsula to the south.

The continent includes twelve sovereign countries: Argentina, Bolivia, Brazil, Chile, Colombia, Ecuador, Guyana, Paraguay, Peru, Suriname, Uruguay, and Venezuela; two dependent territories: the Falkland Islands and South Georgia and the South Sandwich Islands; (Note: Both are administered as British Overseas Territories under the Crown, claimed by Argentina.) and one internal territory: French Guiana. (Note: An overseas department and region of France.)

The Caribbean South America ABC islands (Aruba, Bonaire, and Curaçao) and Trinidad and Tobago are geologically located on the South-American continental shelf, and thus may be considered part of South America as well. Panama, Ascension Island (a part of Saint Helena, Ascension and Tristan da Cunha) and Bouvet Island (a dependency of Norway) may also be considered parts of South America.

South America has an area of 17,840,000 square kilometers (6,890,000 sq mi). Its population as of 2021 has been estimated at more than 434 million. South America ranks fourth in area (after Asia, Africa, and North America) and fifth in population (after Asia, Africa, Europe, and North America). Brazil is by far the most populous South American country, with almost half of the continent's population, followed by Colombia, Argentina, Venezuela, and Peru. In recent decades, Brazil has also generated half of the continent's GDP and has become the continent's first regional power.

Most of the population lives near the continent's western or eastern coasts while the interior and the far south are sparsely populated. The geography of western South America is dominated by the Andes Mountains; in contrast, the eastern part contains both highland regions and vast lowlands where rivers such as the Amazon, Orinoco, and Paraná flow. Most of the continent lies in the tropics, except for a large part of the Southern Cone located in the middle latitudes.

The continent's cultural and ethnic outlook has its origin in the interaction of Indigenous peoples with European conquerors and immigrants and, more locally, with African slaves. Given a long history of colonialism, the overwhelming majority of South Americans speak Portuguese or Spanish, and societies and states are rich in Western traditions. Relative to Africa, Asia, and Europe, post-1900 South America has been a peaceful continent with few wars, (Note: Despite relative peace, some international tensions persist, and intra-state levels of violence are high.) although high rates of violent crime remain a concern in some countries.

== History ==
=== Prehistory ===
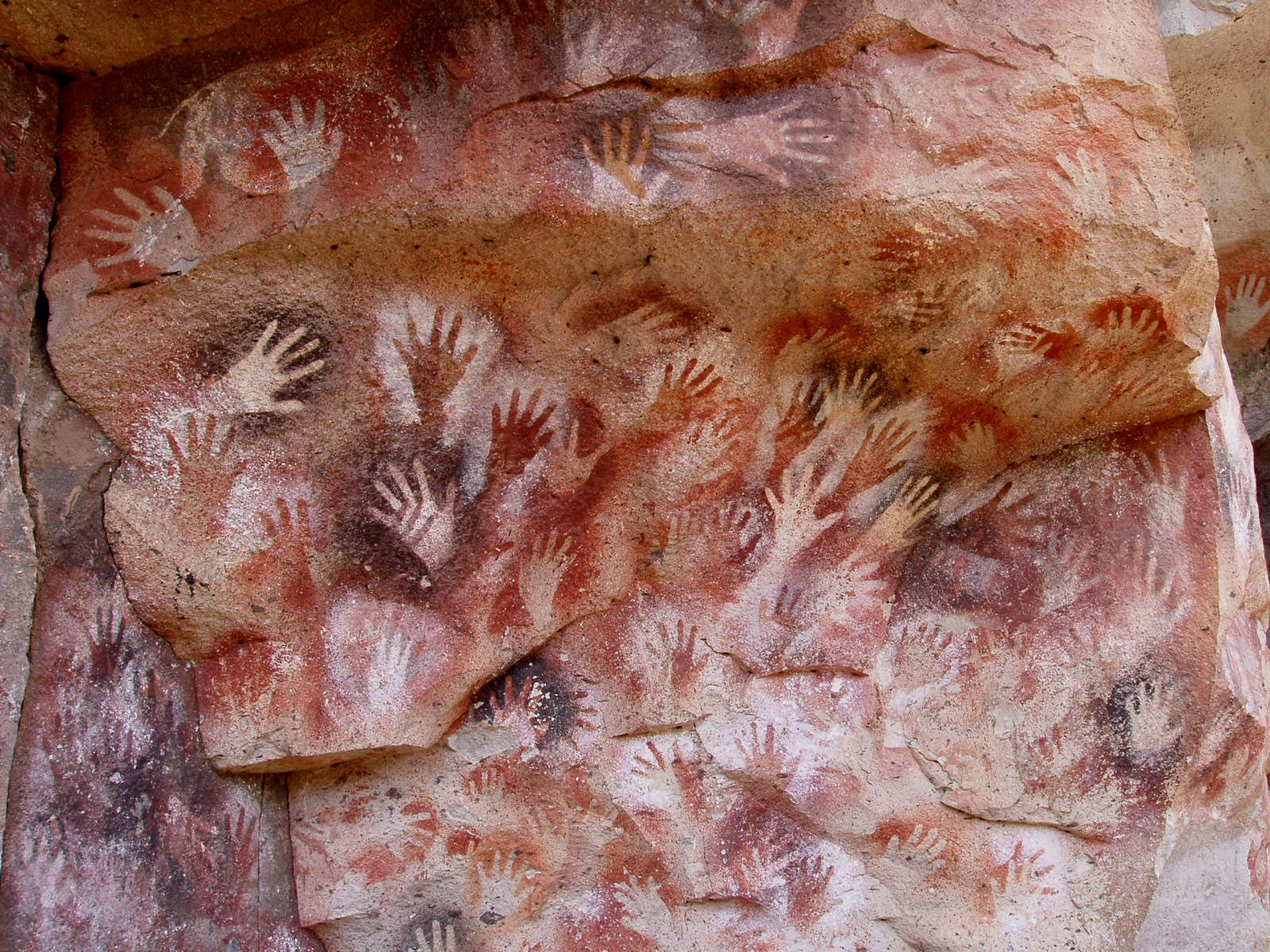
The prehistoric Cueva de las Manos, or "Cave of the Hands", in Argentina

South America is thought to have been first inhabited by humans when people were crossing the Bering Land Bridge (now the Bering Strait) at least 15,000 years ago from the territory that is present-day Russia. They migrated south through North America, and eventually reached South America through the Isthmus of Panama.

Amongst the oldest evidence for human presence in South America is the Monte Verde II site in Chile, suggested to date to around 14,500 years ago. From around 13,000 years ago, the Fishtail projectile point style became widespread across South America, with its disappearance around 11,000 years ago coincident with the disappearance of South America's megafauna.

Ancient DNA evidence indicates that the peopling of South America was more complex than a single southward migration followed by uninterrupted population continuity. A genomic study identified at least three major dispersals into the subcontinent, followed by regional differentiation and long-term genetic continuity in some regions, with evidence of population replacement in others.

Maize was present in northern South America by around 6,000 years ago. South American cultures began domesticating llamas and alpacas in the highlands of the Andes circa 3500 BC. Besides their use as sources of meat and wool, these animals were used for transportation of goods.

By 2000 BC, many agrarian communities had been settled throughout the Andes and the surrounding regions. Fishing became a widespread practice along the coast, helping establish fish as a primary source of food. Irrigation systems were also developed at this time, which aided in the rise of an agrarian society.

=== Pre-Columbian civilizations ===
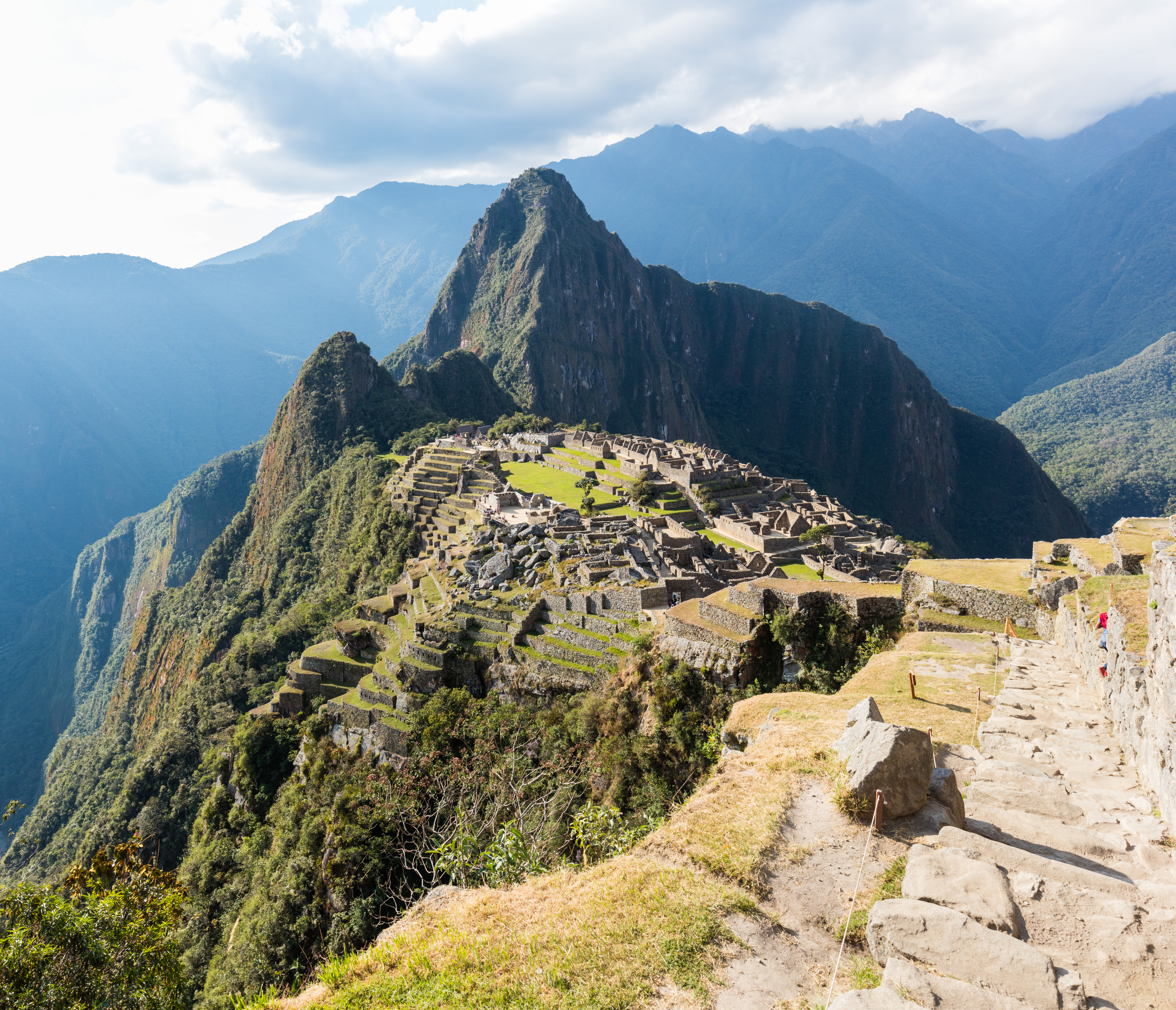
The Inca estate of Machu Picchu, Peru, is one of the New Seven Wonders of the World.

The rise of plant growing and the subsequent appearance of permanent human settlements allowed for the multiple and overlapping beginnings of civilizations in South America.

One of the earliest known South American civilizations was Caral–Supe, on the central Peruvian coast. Though a pre-ceramic culture, the monumental architecture of Caral–Supe created one of the first cities of the world, generally dated to around 3500 BC, at Huaricanga in the Fortaleza area, contemporaneous with the pyramids of Ancient Egypt, one of the oldest-known civilizations in the Americas and one of the six sites where civilization separately originated in the ancient world. The Caral–Supe governing class established a trade network and developed agriculture, followed by Chavín by 900 BC, according to some estimates and archaeological finds. Artifacts were found at a site called Chavín de Huántar in modern Peru at an elevation of 3,177 meters (10,423 ft). Chavín civilization spanned 900 BC to 300 BC.

On the central coast of Peru, around the beginning of the 1st millennium AD, Moche (100 BC – 700 AD, on the northern coast of Peru), Paracas, and Nazca (400 BC – 800 AD, Peru) cultures flourished with centralized states with permanent militias, improving agriculture through irrigation and new styles of ceramic art. At the Altiplano, Tiahuanaco or Tiwanaku (100 BC – 1200 AD, Bolivia) managed a large commercial network based on religion.

Around the 7th century, both Tiahuanaco and the Wari or Huari Empire (600–1200, Central and northern Peru) expanded their influence to all the Andean region, imposing the Huari urbanism and Tiahuanaco religious iconography.

The Muisca were the main indigenous civilization in what is now Colombia. They established the Muisca Confederation of many clans, or cacicazgos, that had a free trade network among themselves. Many were goldsmiths and farmers.

Other important Pre-Columbian cultures include: the Cañaris (in south central Ecuador), Chimú Empire (1300–1470, Peruvian northern coast), Chachapoyas, and the Aymaran kingdoms (1000–1450, Western Bolivia and southern Peru). Holding their capital at the great city of Cusco, the Inca civilization dominated the Andes region from 1438 to 1533. Known as Tawantin Suyu, or "the land of the four regions" in Quechua, the Inca Empire was highly distinct and developed. Inca rule extended to nearly a hundred linguistic or ethnic communities, some nine to fourteen million people connected by a 25,000 kilometer road system. Cities were built with precise, unmatched stonework, constructed over many levels of mountain terrain. Terrace farming was a useful form of agriculture.

The Mapuche in Central and Southern Chile resisted the European and Chilean settlers, waging the Arauco War for more than 300 years.

=== European colonization ===
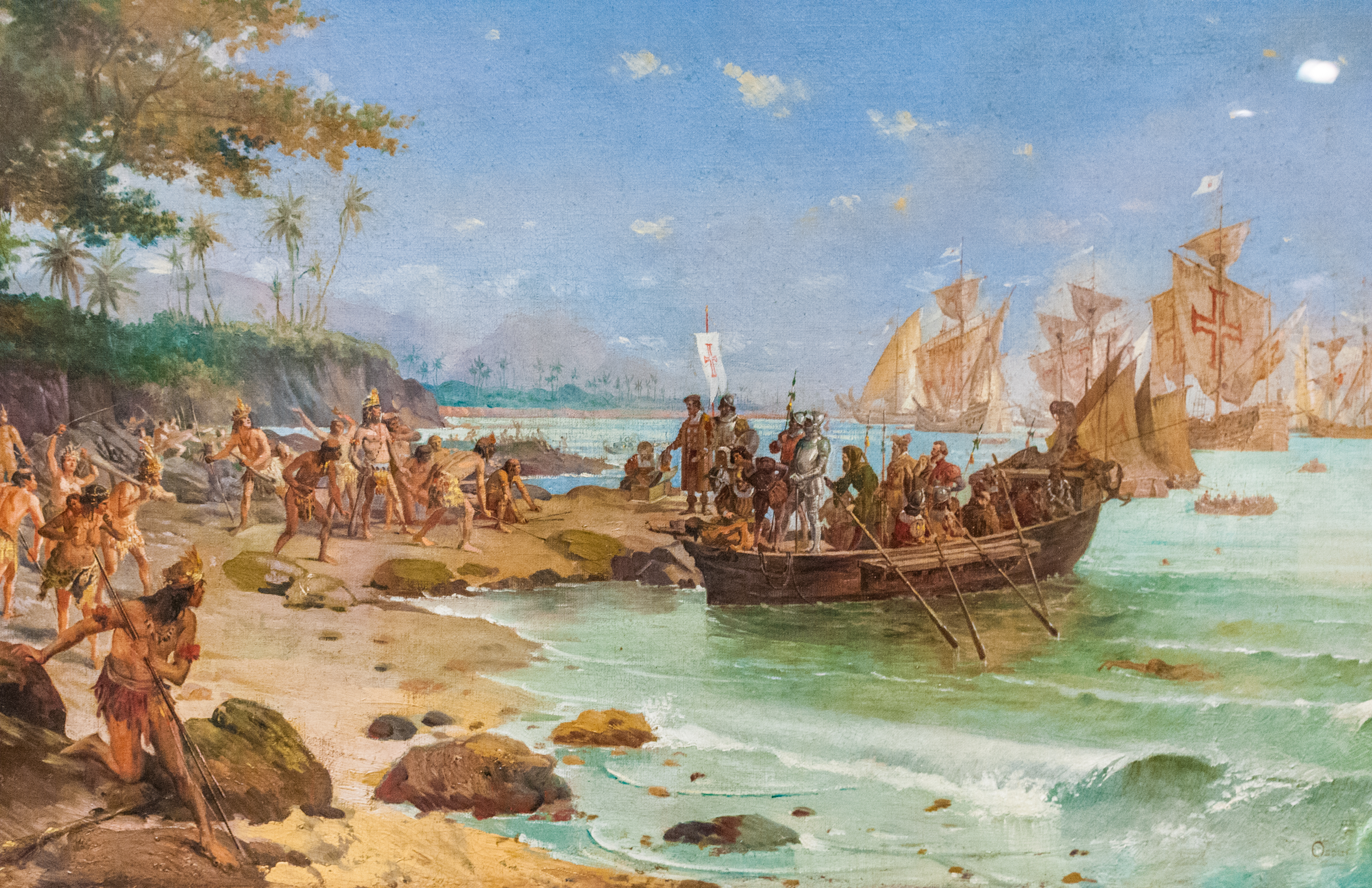
The Portuguese explorer Pedro Álvares Cabral landing in Brazil in 1500

In 1494, Portugal and Spain, the two great maritime European powers of that time, on the expectation of new lands being discovered in the west, signed the Treaty of Tordesillas, by which they agreed, with the support of the Pope, that all the land outside Europe should be an exclusive duopoly between the two countries.

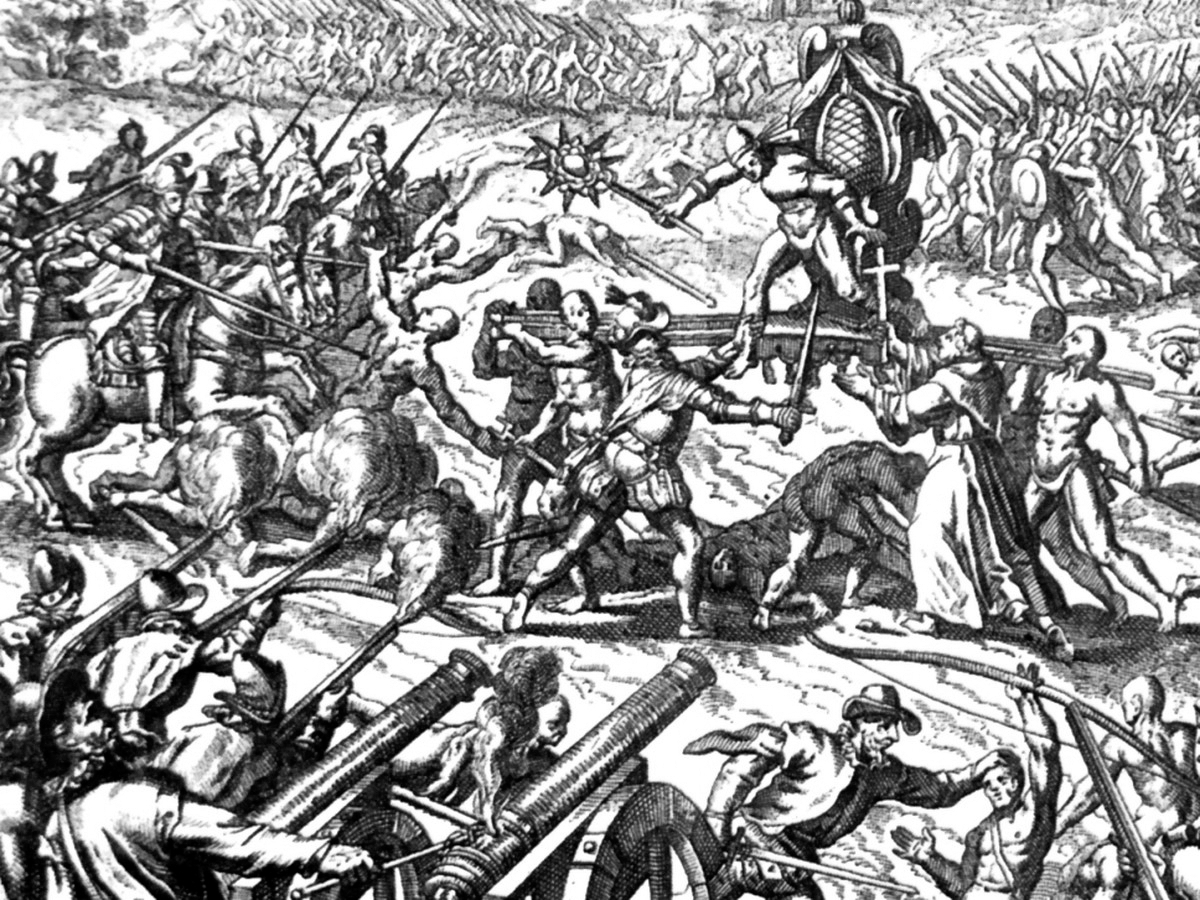
The Inca–Spanish confrontation in the Battle of Cajamarca left thousands of natives dead.

The treaty established an imaginary line along a north–south meridian 370 leagues (approximately 1,110 mi (1,790 km)) west of the Cape Verde Islands, roughly 46° 37' W. In terms of the treaty, all land to the west of the line (known to comprise most of the South American soil) would belong to Spain, and all land to the east, to Portugal. As accurate measurements of longitude were impossible at that time, the line was not strictly enforced, resulting in a Portuguese expansion of Brazil across the meridian.

Beginning in the 1530s, the people and natural resources of South America were repeatedly exploited by foreign conquistadors, first from Spain and later from Portugal. These competing colonial nations claimed the land and resources as their own and divided it into colonies.

European infectious diseases (smallpox, influenza, measles, and typhus) – to which the native populations had no immune resistance – caused large-scale depopulation of the native population under Spanish control. Systems of forced labor, such as the haciendas and the mining industry's mit'a, also contributed to the depopulation. After this, enslaved Africans, who had developed immunities to these diseases, were quickly brought in to replace them.

An interpretation of the extent of the Spanish and Portuguese colonies in the Americas in 1790

The Spaniards were committed to converting their native subjects to Christianity and were quick to purge any native cultural practices that hindered this end; however, many initial attempts at this were only partially successful, as native groups simply blended Catholicism with their established beliefs and practices. Furthermore, the Spaniards brought their language to the degree they did with their religion, although the Roman Catholic Church's evangelization in Quechua, Aymara, and Guaraní actually contributed to the continued use of these native languages, albeit only in the oral form.

Eventually, the natives and the Spaniards interbred, forming a mestizo class. At the beginning, many mestizos of the Andean region were offspring of Amerindian mothers and Spanish fathers. After independence, most mestizos had native fathers and European or mestizo mothers.

Many native artworks were considered pagan idols and destroyed by Spanish explorers; this included many gold and silver sculptures and other artifacts found in South America, which were melted down before their transport to Spain or Portugal. Spaniards and Portuguese brought the western European architectural style to the continent, and they helped to improve infrastructure such as bridges, roads, and the sewer system of the cities they discovered or conquered. They also significantly increased economic and trade relations, not just between the Old and New Worlds, but also between the different South American regions and peoples. Finally, with the expansion of the Portuguese and Spanish languages, many cultures that were previously separated became united through a shared Latin American culture.

Guyana was initially colonized by the Dutch before coming under British control, though there was a brief period during the Napoleonic Wars when it was occupied by the French. The region was initially partitioned between the Dutch, French, and British before fully coming under the control of Britain.

Suriname was first explored by the Spanish in the 16th century and then settled by the English in the mid-17th century. It became a Dutch colony in 1667.

=== Slavery ===
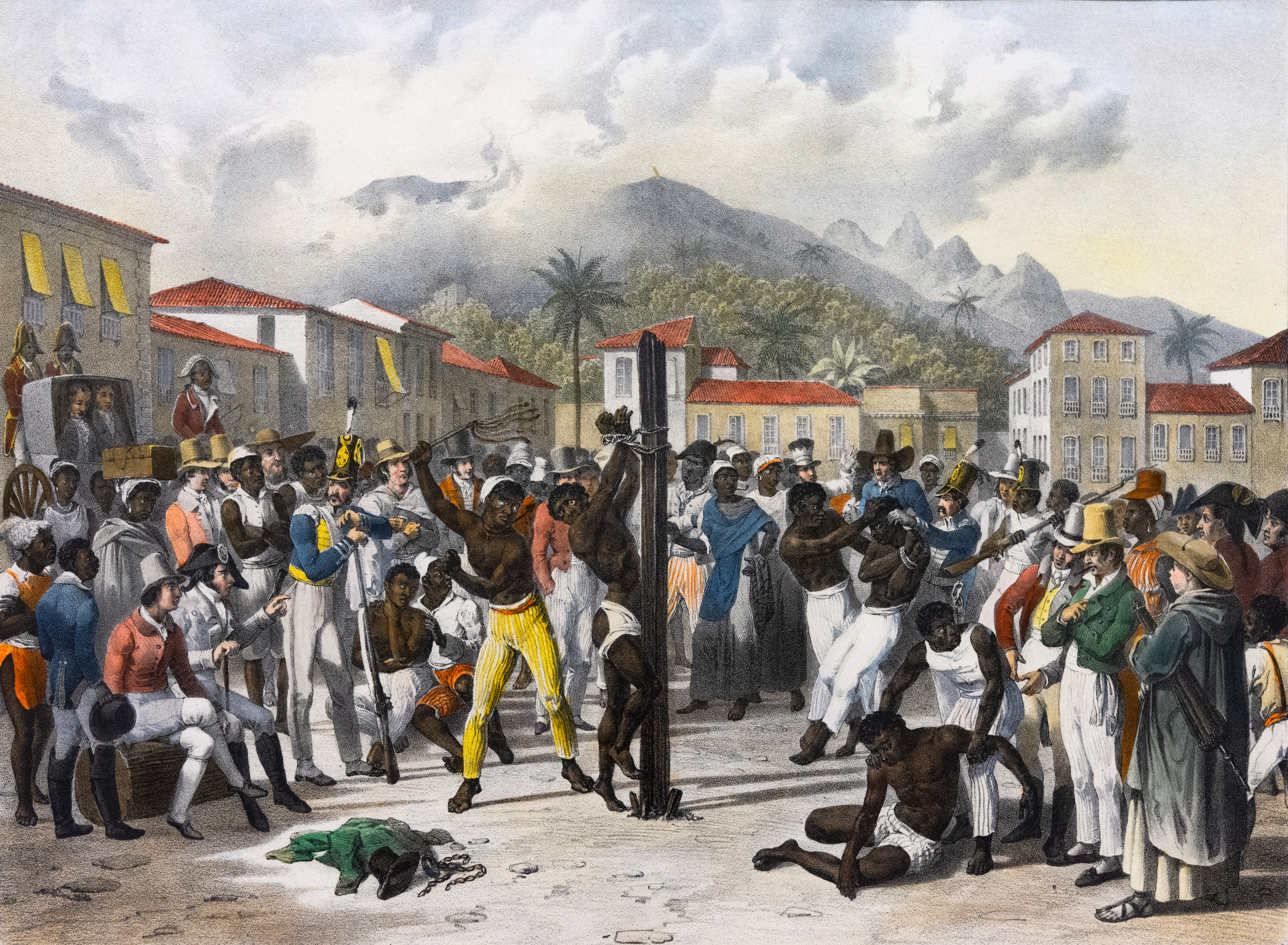
Public flogging of a slave in 19th-century Brazil

The indigenous peoples of the Americas in various European colonies were forced to work in European plantations and mines, along with enslaved Africans who were also introduced in the succeeding centuries via the Atlantic slave trade. European colonists were heavily dependent on indigenous labor during the initial phases of settlement to maintain the subsistence economy, and natives were often captured by expeditions. The importation of African slaves began midway through the 16th century, but the enslavement of indigenous peoples continued well into the 17th and 18th centuries. The slave trade brought enslaved Africans primarily to South American colonies, beginning with the Portuguese since 1502. The main destinations of this phase were the Caribbean colonies and Brazil, as European nations built up economically slave-dependent colonies in the New World. Nearly 40% of all African slaves trafficked to the Americas went to Brazil. An estimated 4.9 million slaves from Africa came to Brazil during the period from 1501 to 1866.

In contrast to other European colonies in the Americas, which mainly used the labor of African slaves, Spanish colonists mainly enslaved indigenous Americans. In 1750, the Portuguese Crown abolished the enslavement of indigenous peoples in colonial Brazil, under the belief that they were unfit for labor and less effective than enslaved Africans. Enslaved Africans were brought to the Americas on slave ships, under inhuman conditions and ill-treatment, and those who survived were sold in slave markets. After independence, all South American countries maintained slavery for some time. The first South American country to abolish slavery was Chile in 1823, Uruguay in 1830, Bolivia in 1831, Guyana in 1833, Colombia and Ecuador in 1851, Argentina in 1853, Peru and Venezuela in 1854, Suriname in 1863, Paraguay in 1869, and in 1888 Brazil was the last South American nation and the last country in the Western world to abolish slavery.

=== Independence from Spain and Portugal ===
The European Peninsular War (1807–14), a theater of the Napoleonic Wars, changed the political situation of the Spanish and Portuguese colonies. First, Napoleon invaded Portugal, but the House of Braganza avoided capture by escaping to Brazil. Napoleon captured King Ferdinand VII of Spain and appointed his own brother instead. This appointment provoked popular resistance, which created Juntas to rule in the name of the captured king.

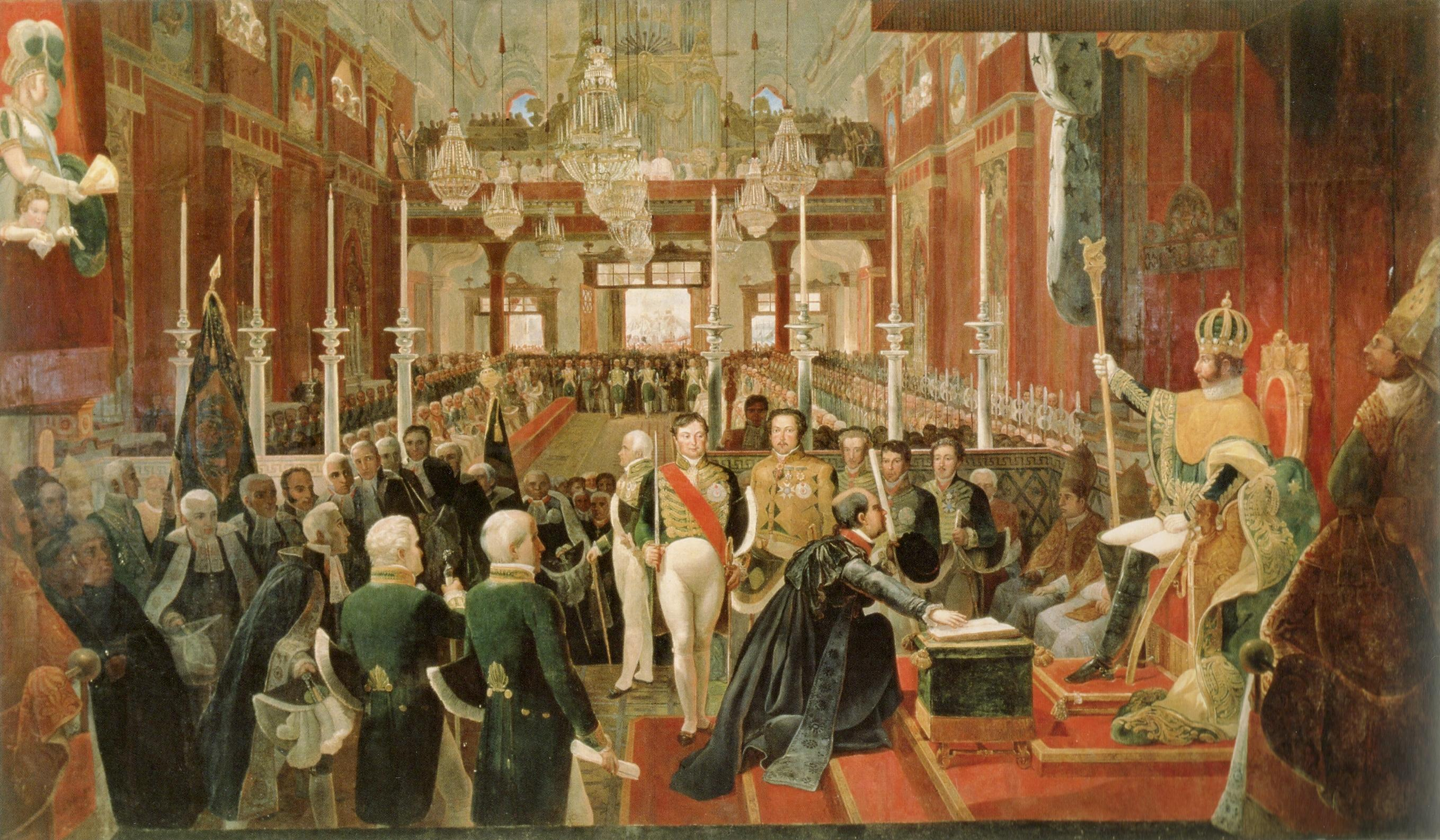
Coronation of Pedro I as 1st Emperor of Brazil

Many cities in the Spanish colonies, however, considered themselves equally authorized to appoint local Juntas like those of Spain. This began the Spanish American wars of independence between the patriots, who promoted such autonomy, and the royalists, who supported Spanish authority over the Americas. The Juntas, in both Spain and the Americas, promoted the ideas of the Enlightenment. Five years after the beginning of the war, Ferdinand VII returned to the throne and began the Absolutist Restoration, as the royalists got the upper hand in the conflict.

The independence of South America was secured by Simón Bolívar (Venezuela) and José de San Martín (Argentina), the two most important Libertadores. Bolívar led a great uprising in the north, then led his army south towards Lima, the capital of the Viceroyalty of Peru. Meanwhile, San Martín led an army across the Andes Mountains, along with Chilean expatriates, and liberated Chile. He organized a fleet to reach Peru by sea, and sought the military support of various rebels from the Viceroyalty of Peru. In 1822, the two men met at the Guayaquil Conference in Ecuador, where they failed to agree on governance strategies for the liberated nations. Two years later, Bolívar's forces beat the Spanish at the Battle of Ayacucho, securing the independence of Peru and the rest of South America.

In the Portuguese Kingdom of Brazil, Dom Pedro I (also Pedro IV of Portugal), son of the Portuguese King Dom João VI, proclaimed the independent Kingdom of Brazil in 1822, which later became the Empire of Brazil. Despite the Portuguese loyalties of garrisons in Bahia, Cisplatina, and Pará, independence was diplomatically accepted by Portugal in 1825, on condition of a high compensation paid by Brazil, mediated by the United Kingdom.

=== Nation-building and fragmentation ===
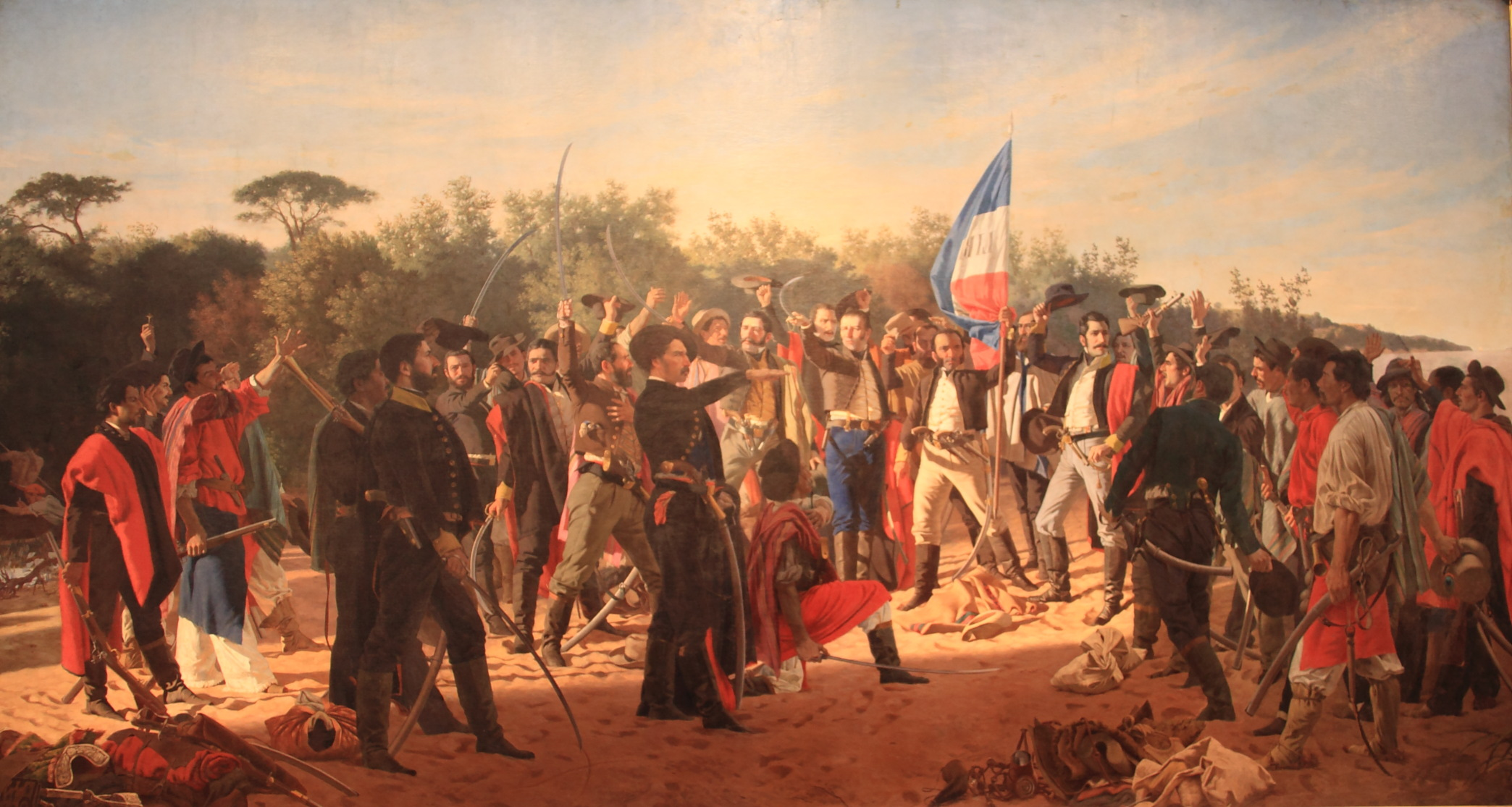
The Thirty-Three Orientals proclaimed the independence of Cisplatine Province.

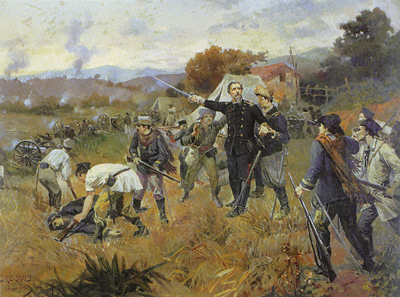
Battle scene in Southern Brazil during the Ragamuffin War

The newly independent nations began a process of fragmentation, with several civil and international wars. However, it was not as strong as in Central America. Some countries created from provinces of larger countries stayed as such up to modern times (such as Paraguay or Uruguay), while others were reconquered and reincorporated into their former countries (such as the Republic of Entre Ríos and the Riograndense Republic).

The first separatist attempt was in 1820 by the Argentine province of Entre Ríos, led by a caudillo. Despite the "Republic" in its title, General Ramírez, its caudillo, never really intended to declare an independent Entre Ríos. Rather, he was making a political statement in opposition to the monarchist and centralist ideas that back then permeated Buenos Aires politics. The "country" was reincorporated into the United Provinces in 1821.

In 1825, the Cisplatine Province declared its independence from the Empire of Brazil, which led to the Cisplatine War between the imperialists and the Argentines from the United Provinces of the Río de la Plata to control the region. Three years later, the United Kingdom intervened in the question by proclaiming a tie and creating in the former Cisplatina a new independent country: The Oriental Republic of Uruguay.

Later in 1836, while Brazil was experiencing the chaos of the regency, Rio Grande do Sul proclaimed its independence motivated by a tax crisis. With the anticipation of the coronation of Pedro II to the throne of Brazil, the country could stabilize and fight the separatists, which the province of Santa Catarina had joined in 1839. The conflict came to an end through a process of compromise by which both the Riograndense Republic and the Juliana Republic were reincorporated as provinces in 1845.

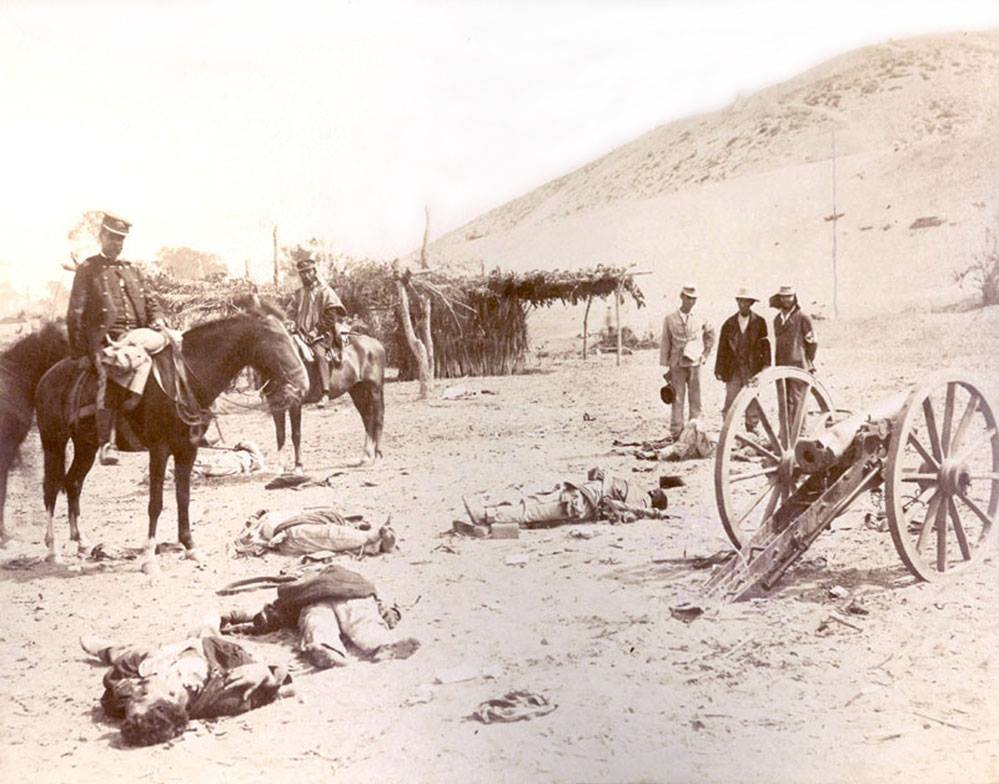
The Chilean Army in the battlefield of the Battle of Chorrillos, 1883

The Peru–Bolivian Confederation, a short-lived union of Peru and Bolivia, was blocked by Chile in the War of the Confederation (1836–1839) and again during the War of the Pacific (1879–1883). Paraguay was virtually destroyed by Argentina, Brazil, and Uruguay in the Paraguayan War.

=== Wars and conflicts ===
Despite the Spanish American wars of independence and the Brazilian War of Independence, the new nations quickly began to suffer from internal conflicts and wars among themselves. Most of the countries' borders that had initially accepted the 1810 borders on the uti possidetis iuris principle had by 1848 either been altered by war or were contested.

In 1825, the proclamation of independence of Cisplatina led to the Cisplatine War between historical rivals, the Empire of Brazil and the United Provinces of the Río de la Plata, Argentina's predecessor. The result was a stalemate, ending with the British government arranging for the independence of Uruguay. Soon after, another Brazilian province proclaimed its independence, leading to the Ragamuffin War, which Brazil won.

Between 1836 and 1839, the War of the Confederation broke out between the short-lived Peru-Bolivian Confederation and Chile, with the support of the Argentine Confederation. The war was fought mostly in the actual territory of Peru and ended with a Confederate defeat and the dissolution of the Confederation and annexation of many territories by Argentina.

Meanwhile, the Argentine Civil Wars plagued Argentina since its independence. The conflict was mainly between those who defended the centralization of power in Buenos Aires and those who defended a confederation. During this period, it can be said that "there were two Argentines": the Argentine Confederation and the Argentine Republic. At the same time, the political instability in Uruguay led to the Uruguayan Civil War among the main political factions of the country. All this instability in the Platine region interfered with the goals of other countries such as Brazil, which was soon forced to take sides. In 1851, the Brazilian Empire, supporting the centralizing unitarians, and the Uruguayan government invaded Argentina and deposed the caudillo, Juan Manuel Rosas, who ruled the confederation with an iron hand. Although the Platine War did not put an end to the political chaos and civil war in Argentina, it brought temporary peace to Uruguay, where the Colorados faction won, supported by Brazil, Britain, France, and the Unitarian Party of Argentina.

Peace lasted only a short time: in 1864, the Uruguayan factions faced each other again in the Uruguayan War. The Blancos, supported by Paraguay, started to attack Brazilian and Argentine farmers near the borders. The Empire made an initial attempt to settle the dispute between Blancos and Colorados without success. In 1864, after a Brazilian ultimatum was refused, the imperial government declared that Brazil's military would begin reprisals. Brazil declined to acknowledge a formal state of war, and, for most of its duration, the Uruguayan–Brazilian armed conflict was an undeclared war which led to the deposition of the Blancos and the rise of the pro-Brazilian Colorados to power again. This angered the Paraguayan government, which—even before the end of the war—invaded Brazil, beginning the longest and bloodiest interstate war in Latin American history: the Paraguayan War.

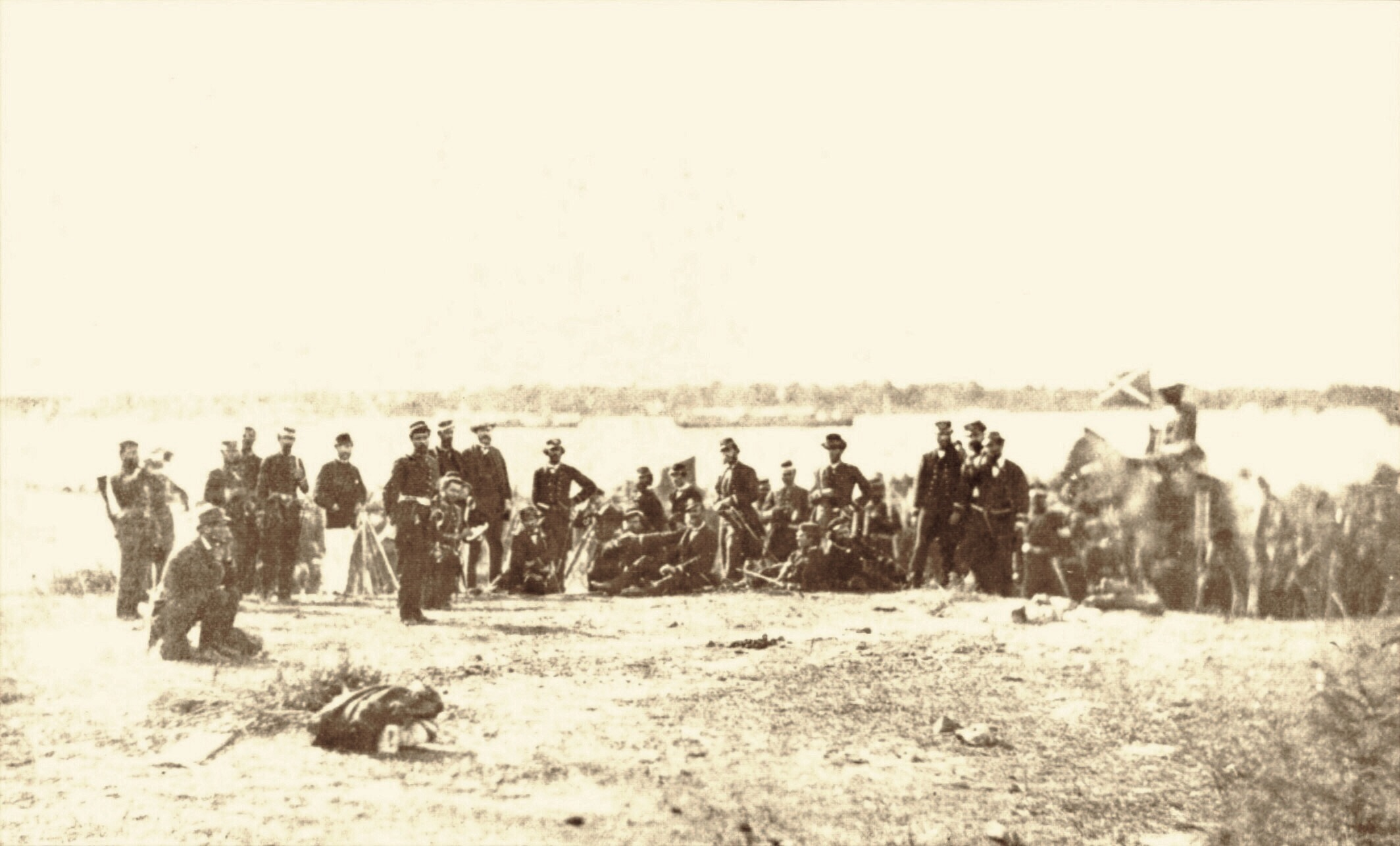
Imperial Brazilian Navy siege of Paysandú, 1865

The Paraguayan War began when the Paraguayan dictator Francisco Solano López ordered the invasion of the Brazilian provinces of Mato Grosso and Rio Grande do Sul. His attempt to cross Argentinian territory without Argentinian approval led the pro-Brazilian Argentine government into the war. The pro-Brazilian Uruguayan government showed its support by sending troops. In 1865, the three countries signed the Treaty of the Triple Alliance against Paraguay. At the beginning of the war, the Paraguayans took the lead with several victories, until the Triple Alliance organized to repel the invaders and fight effectively. This was the second total war experience in the world after the American Civil War. It was deemed the greatest war effort in the history of all participating countries, taking almost 6 years and ending with the complete devastation of Paraguay. The country lost 40% of its territory to Brazil and Argentina and lost 60% of its population, including 90% of the men. The dictator López was killed in battle, and a new government was instituted in alliance with Brazil, which maintained occupation forces in the country until 1876.

The last South American war in the 19th century was the War of the Pacific, with Bolivia and Peru on one side and Chile on the other. In 1879, the war began with Chilean troops occupying Bolivian ports, followed by Bolivia declaring war on Chile, which activated an alliance treaty with Peru. The Bolivians were completely defeated in 1880, and Lima was occupied in 1881. Peace was signed with Peru in 1883, while a truce was signed with Bolivia in 1884. Chile annexed territories of both countries, leaving Bolivia landlocked.

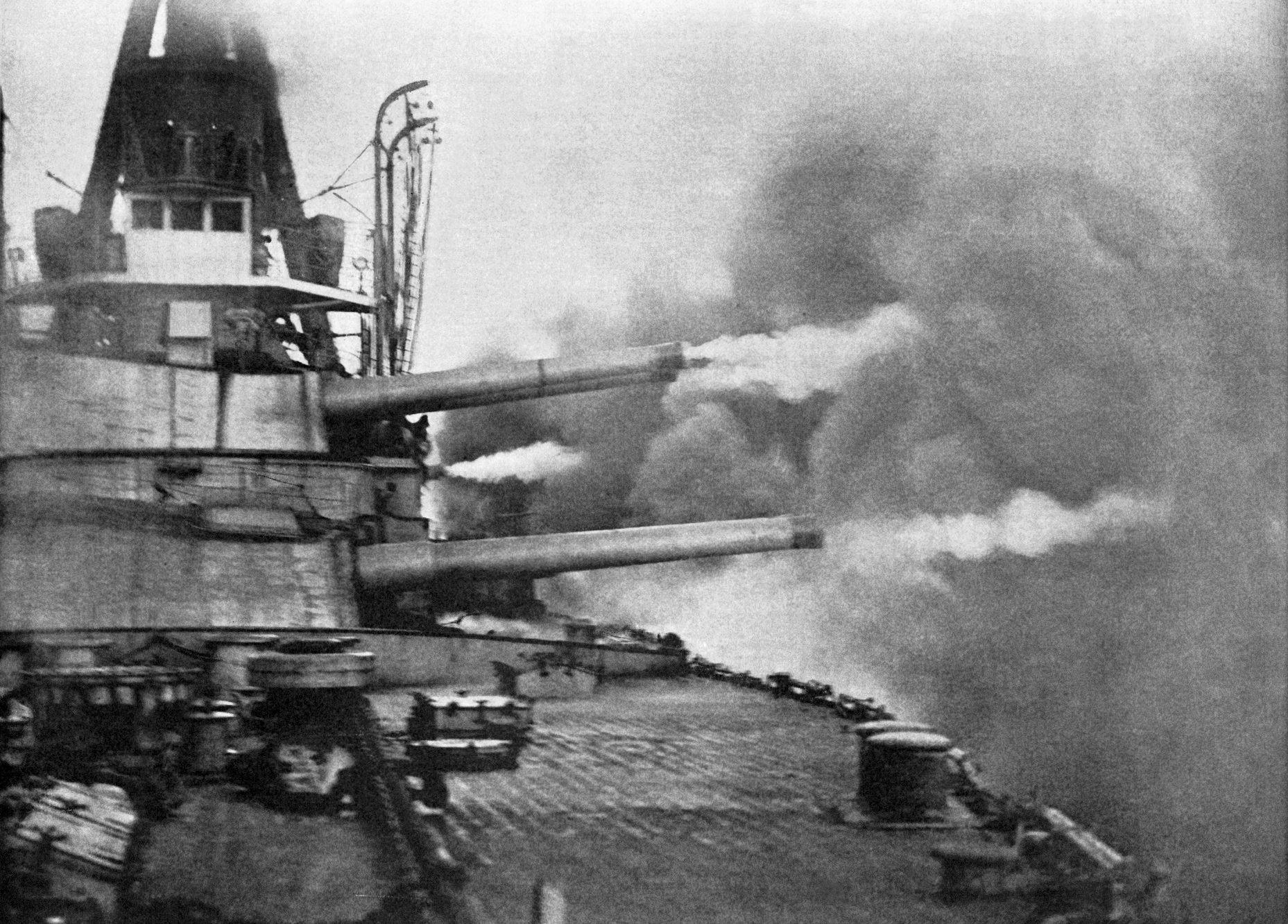
The Brazilian Minas Geraes class kindled an Argentine–Brazilian–Chilean naval arms race.

In the new century, as wars became less violent and less frequent, Brazil entered into a small conflict with Bolivia for the possession of the Acre, which was acquired by Brazil in 1902. In 1917, Brazil declared war on the Central Powers, joined the Allied side in the First World War, and sent a small fleet to the Mediterranean Sea, along with some troops to be integrated with the British and French forces in the region. Brazil was the only South American country that participated in the First World War. Later in 1932, Colombia and Peru entered a short armed conflict for territory in the Amazon. In the same year, Paraguay declared war on Bolivia for possession of the Chaco, in a conflict that ended three years later with Paraguay's victory. Between 1941 and 1942, Peru and Ecuador fought for territories claimed by both that were annexed by Peru, usurping Ecuador's frontier with Brazil.

Also in this period, the first major naval battle of World War II took place in the South Atlantic close to the continental mainland: the Battle of the River Plate, between a British cruiser squadron and a German pocket battleship. The Germans still made numerous attacks on Brazilian ships on the coast, causing Brazil to declare war on the Axis powers in 1942, making it the only South American country to fight in this war (and in both World Wars). Brazil sent naval and air forces to combat German and Italian submarines off the continent and throughout the South Atlantic, in addition to sending an expeditionary force to fight in the Italian Campaign.

A brief war was fought between Argentina and the UK in 1982, following an Argentine invasion of the Falkland Islands, which ended with an Argentine defeat. The last international war to be fought on South American soil was the 1995 Cenepa War between Ecuador and Peru along their mutual border.

=== Rise and fall of military dictatorships ===
Wars became less frequent in the 20th century, with Bolivia-Paraguay and Peru-Ecuador fighting the last interstate wars. Early in the 20th century, the three wealthiest South American countries engaged in a vastly expensive naval arms race which began after the introduction of a new warship type, the "dreadnought". At one point, the Argentine government was spending a fifth of its entire yearly budget for just two dreadnoughts, a price that did not include later in-service costs, which for the Brazilian dreadnoughts was sixty percent of the initial purchase.

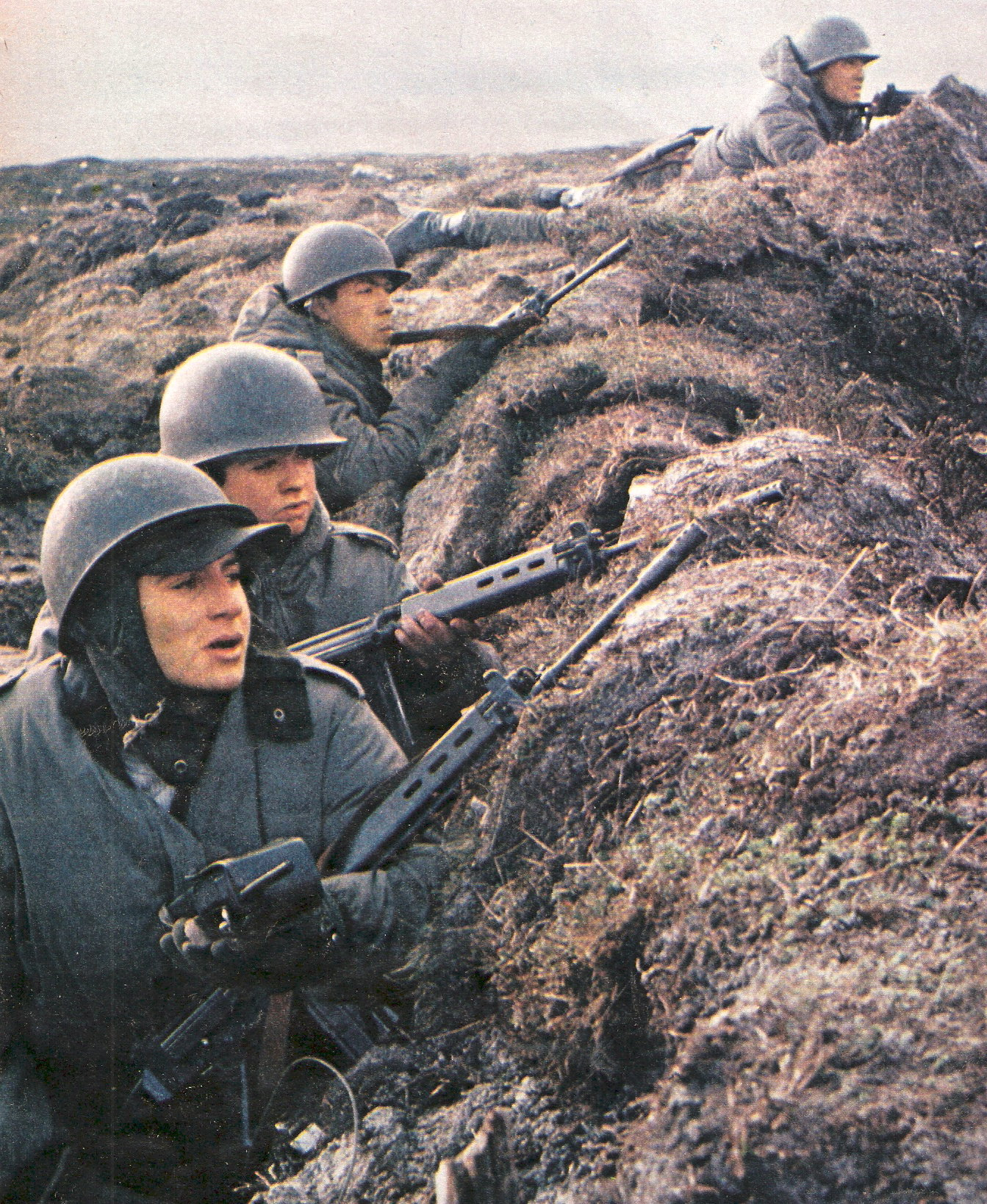
Argentine soldiers during the Falklands War

The continent became a battlefield of the Cold War in the late 20th century. Some democratically elected governments of Argentina, Brazil, Chile, Uruguay and Paraguay were overthrown or displaced by military dictatorships in the 1960s and 1970s. To curtail opposition, their governments detained tens of thousands of political prisoners, many of whom were tortured or killed in interstate collaboration. Economically, they began a transition to neoliberal economic policies. They placed their own actions within the US Cold War doctrine of "National Security" against internal subversion. Throughout the 1980s and 1990s, Peru suffered from an internal conflict.

In 1982, Argentina invaded the Falkland Islands, a British dependent territory. The Falklands War began, and 74 days later Argentine forces surrendered.

Colombia has had an ongoing, though diminished, internal conflict, which started in 1964 with the creation of Marxist guerrillas (FARC-EP) and then involved several illegal armed groups of leftist-leaning ideology as well as the private armies of powerful drug lords. Many of these are now defunct, and only a small portion of the ELN remains, along with the stronger, though also greatly reduced, FARC.

Revolutionary movements and right-wing military dictatorships became common after World War II, but since the 1980s, a wave of democratization has passed through the continent, and democratic rule is widespread now. Nonetheless, allegations of corruption are still very common, and several countries have developed crises which have forced the resignation of their governments, although, on most occasions, regular civilian succession has continued.

International indebtedness became a significant problem in the late 1980s, and some countries, despite having strong democracies, have not developed political institutions capable of handling such crises without resorting to unorthodox economic policies. This was illustrated by Argentina's default in the early 21st century. There has been an increased push towards regional integration, with the creation of uniquely South American institutions such as the Andean Community, Mercosur and Unasur. Starting with the election of Hugo Chávez in Venezuela in 1998, the region experienced a pink tide – the election of several leftist and center-left administrations in most countries, except the Guianas and Colombia.

=== Contemporary issues ===
South America's political geography since the 1990s has been characterized by a desire to reduce foreign influence. The nationalization of industries, by which the state controls entire economic sectors (as opposed to private companies doing it), has become a prominent political issue in the region. Some South American nations have nationalized their electricity industries.

== Geography ==
South America's landforms and land cover

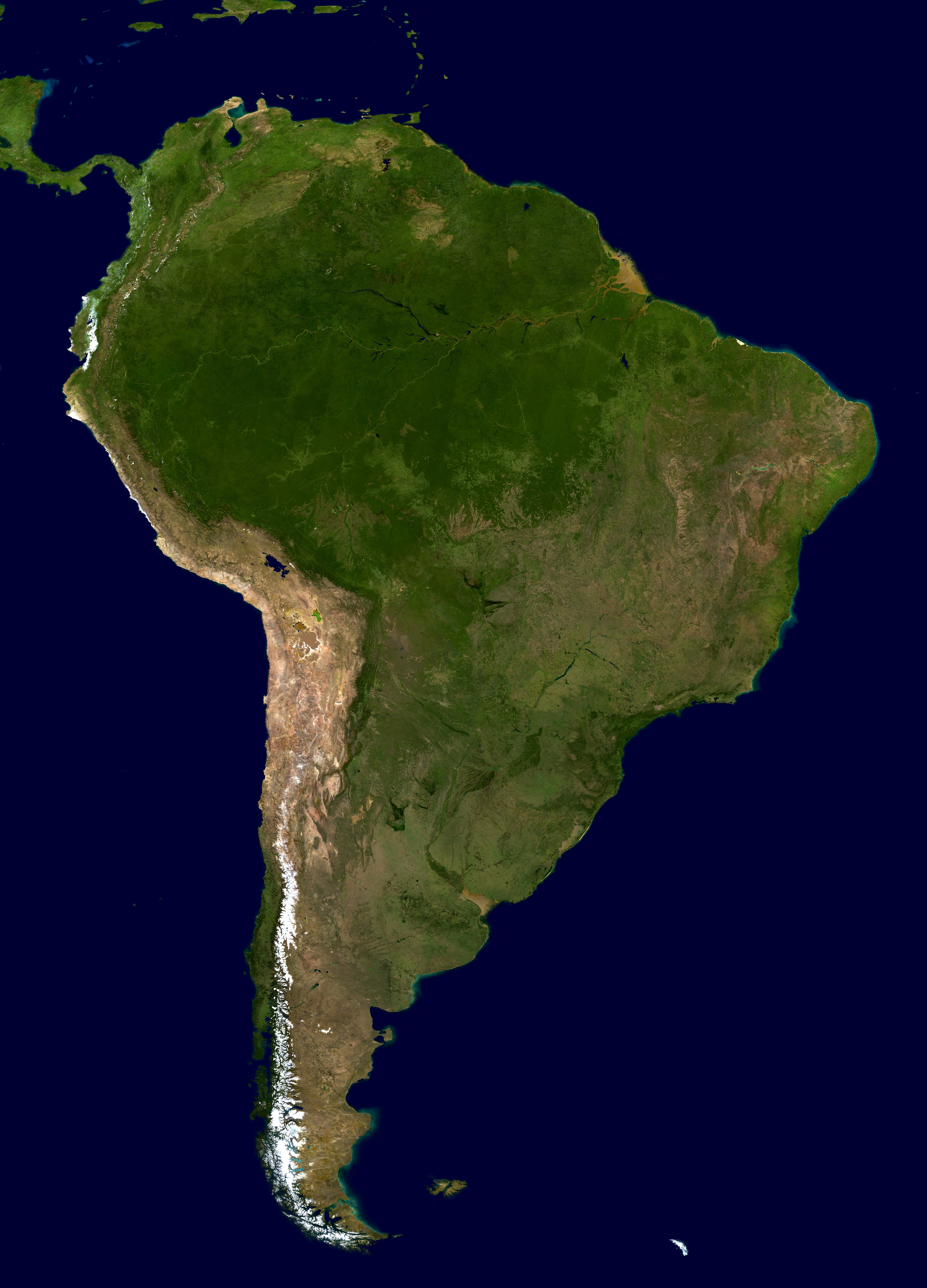
A composite relief image of South America

South America occupies the southern portion of the Americas. The continent is generally delimited on the northwest by the Darién watershed along the Colombia–Panama border, although some may consider the border instead to be the Panama Canal. Geopolitically and geographically, all of Panama – including the segment east of the Panama Canal in the isthmus – is typically included in North America alone and among the countries of Central America. Almost all of mainland South America sits on the South American Plate.

South America is home to several superlatives, including the world's highest uninterrupted waterfall, Angel Falls in Venezuela; the highest single-drop waterfall Kaieteur Falls in Guyana; the largest river by volume, the Amazon River; the longest mountain range, the Andes (whose highest mountain is Aconcagua at 6,962 m or 22,841 ft); the driest non-polar place on earth, the Atacama Desert; the wettest place on earth, López de Micay in Colombia; the largest rainforest, the Amazon rainforest; the highest capital city, La Paz, Bolivia; the highest commercially navigable lake in the world, Lake Titicaca; and, excluding research stations in Antarctica, the world's southernmost permanently inhabited community, Puerto Toro, Chile. South America had the highest annual deforestation rate in 2015–2025 of any region (4.22 million ha); however, this was a reduction of almost 50% from the rate in the region in 1990–2000 (8.24 million ha).

South America's major mineral resources are gold, silver, copper, iron ore, tin, and petroleum. These resources have brought high income to its countries, especially in times of war or of rapid economic growth by industrialized countries elsewhere. However, the concentration on producing one or a few major export commercial products has often hindered the development and diversification of its economies. The fluctuation in the price of commodities in international markets has led historically to major highs and lows, booms and busts, in the economies of South American states, often causing political instability. This has led to calls to diversify production and increase trade within South America itself.

Brazil is the largest country in South America, covering a little less than half of the continent's land area and encompassing around half of the continent's population. The remaining countries and territories are divided among four subregions: the Andean states, Caribbean South America, the Guianas, and the Southern Cone.

=== Outlying islands ===
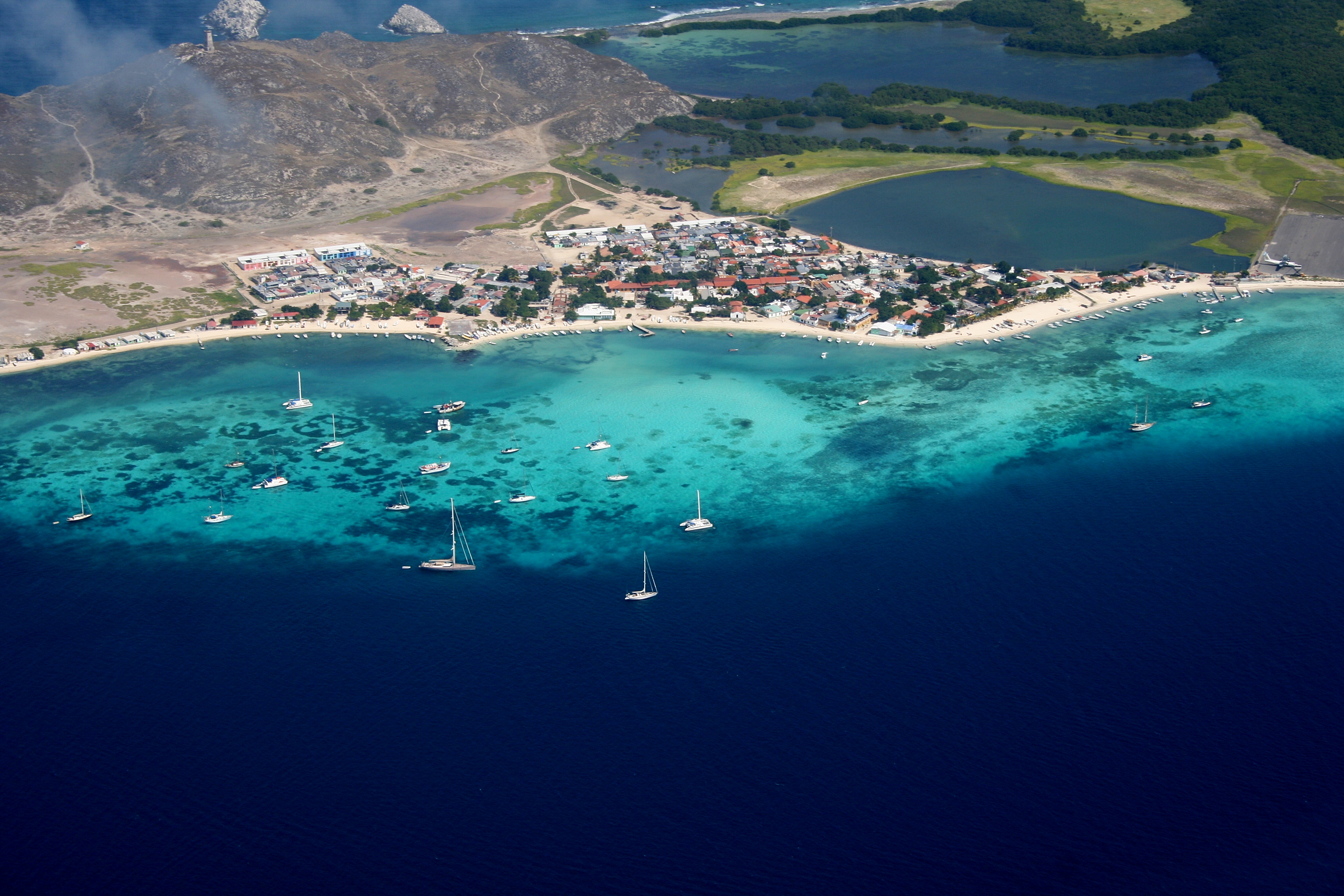
The Gran Roque village, the largest settlement of the Los Roques Archipelago, Venezuela

Physiographically, South America also includes some of the nearby islands. The Dutch ABC islands (Aruba, Bonaire, and Curaçao), the islands of Trinidad and Tobago (Trinidad Island and Tobago Island, etc.), the State of Nueva Esparta, and the Federal Dependencies of Venezuela sit on the northern portion of the South American continental shelf and are sometimes considered parts of the continent. Geopolitically, all the island countries and territories in the Caribbean have generally been grouped as a subregion of North America instead. By contrast, Aves Island (administered by Venezuela) and the Archipelago of San Andrés, Providencia and Santa Catalina (San Andrés Island, Providencia Island, and Santa Catalina Island, etc., which are administered by Colombia) are politically parts of South American countries but physiographically parts of North America.

Other islands often associated with geopolitical South America are the Chiloé Archipelago and Robinson Crusoe Island (both administered by Chile), Easter Island (culturally a part of Oceania, also administered by Chile), the Galápagos Islands (administered by Ecuador, sometimes considered part of Oceania), and Tierra del Fuego (split between Argentina and Chile). In the Atlantic Ocean, Brazil administers Fernando de Noronha, Trindade and Martim Vaz, and the Saint Peter and Saint Paul Archipelago, while the Falkland Islands (Spanish: Islas Malvinas) and South Georgia and the South Sandwich Islands (biogeographically and hydrologically associated with Antarctica) have been administered as two British Overseas Territories under the Crown, whose sovereignty over the islands is disputed by Argentina.

==== Special cases ====
An isolated volcanic island on the South American Plate, Ascension Island is geologically a part of South America. Administered as a dependency of Saint Helena, Ascension and Tristan da Cunha, the island is geopolitically a part of Africa.

=== Climate ===
Köppen-Geiger climate classification map for South America

Most of the world's major climate zones are present in South America.

The distribution of the average temperatures in the region presents a constant regularity from the 30° of latitude south, when the isotherms tend, more and more, to be confused with the degrees of latitude.

In temperate latitudes, winters and summers are milder than in North America. This is because the most extensive part of the continent is in the equatorial zone (the region has more areas of equatorial plains than any other region), therefore giving the Southern Cone more oceanic influence, which moderates year-round temperatures.

The average annual temperatures in the Amazon basin oscillate around 27 °C (81 °F), with low thermal amplitudes and high rainfall indices. Between the Maracaibo Lake and the mouth of the Orinoco, which also includes parts of the Brazilian territory, an equatorial climate typical of the Congolese regions in Central Africa predominates.

The east-central Brazilian plateau has a humid and warm tropical climate. The northern and eastern parts of the Argentine pampas have a humid subtropical climate with dry winters and humid summers commonly classified as a "Chinese type" climate, while the western and eastern ranges have a subtropical climate similar to the Dinaric Alps in Europe. At the highest points of the Andean region, climates are colder than the ones occurring at the highest point of the Norwegian fjords. In the Andean plateaus, the warm climate prevails, although it is tempered by the altitude, while in the coastal strip, there is an equatorial climate commonly classified as a "Guinean type" climate. North of the Andean plateaus, up to the north of the Chilean coast, a Mediterranean oceanic climate dominates with temperate summers and cold winters akin to Cape Breton. In Tierra del Fuego, a cold climate persists that is commonly referred to as a "Siberian type" climate.

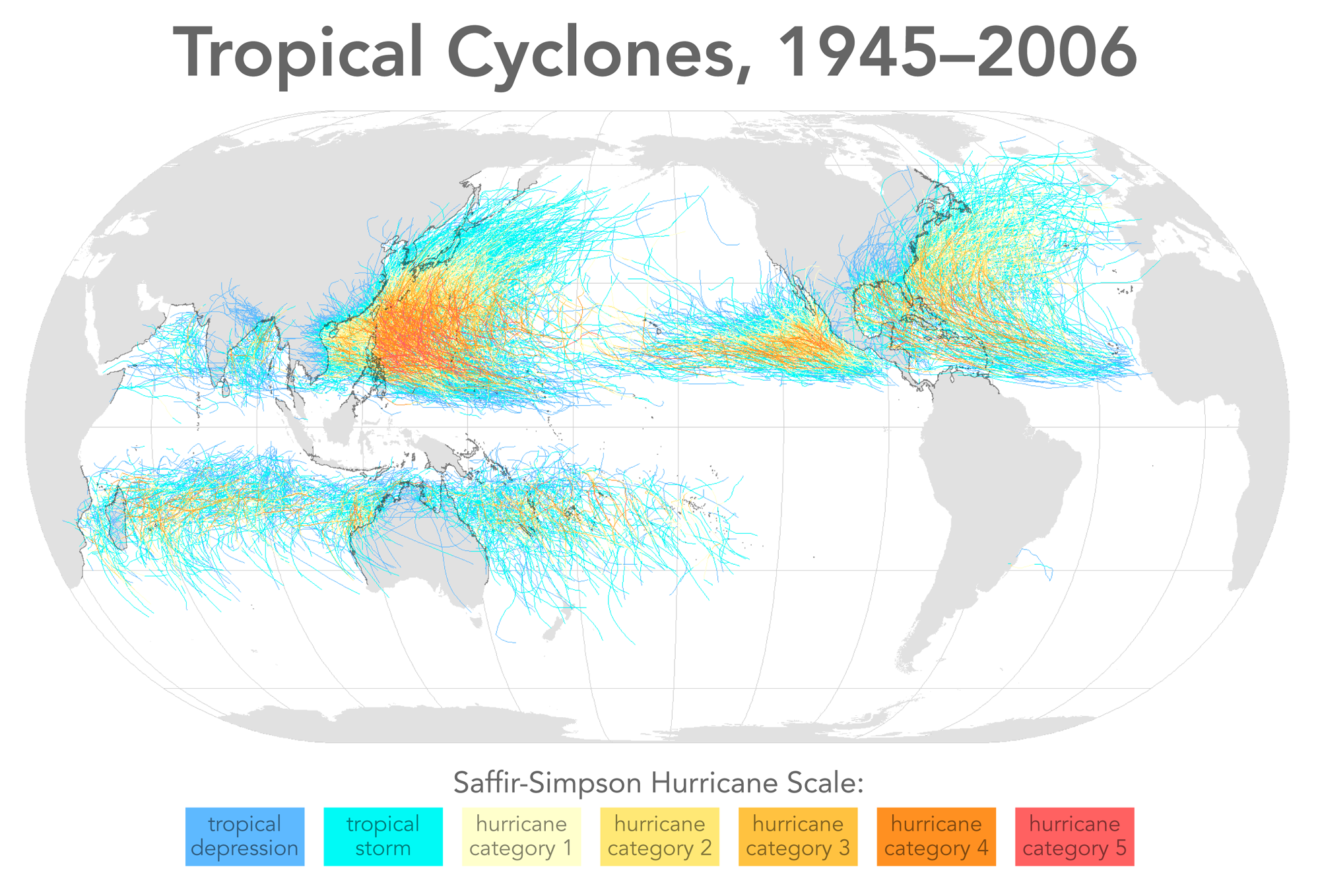
Map of all tropical cyclone tracks from 1945 to 2006

The distribution of rainfall is related to the regime of winds and air masses. In most of the tropical region east of the Andes, winds blowing from the northeast, east, and southeast carry moisture from the Atlantic, causing abundant rainfall. However, due to a consistently strong wind shear and a weak Intertropical Convergence Zone, South Atlantic tropical cyclones are rare. In the Orinoco Llanos and in the Guianas Plateau, the precipitation levels go from moderate to high. The Pacific coast of Colombia and northern Ecuador are rainy regions, with Chocó in Colombia being the rainiest place in the world along with the northern slopes of the Indian Himalayas. The Atacama Desert, along this stretch of coast, is one of the driest regions in the world. The central and southern parts of Chile are subject to extratropical cyclones, and most of the Argentine Patagonia is desert. In the Pampas of Argentina, Uruguay, and southern Brazil, the rainfall is moderate, with rains well distributed during the year. The moderately dry conditions of the Chaco contrast with the intense rainfall of the eastern region of Paraguay. In the semiarid coast of the Brazilian Northeast, the rains are linked to a monsoon regime.

Important factors in the determination of climates are sea currents such as the Humboldt Current and the Falkland Current. The Equatorial Current of the South Atlantic strikes the coast of the Northeast, where it is divided into two others: the current of Brazil and a coastal current that flows to the northwest towards the Antilles; from there, the coastal current turns northeast, forming the most important and famous ocean current in the world, the Gulf Stream.

=== Fauna ===
South America is one of the most biodiverse continents on Earth. It is home to many unique species of animals including the llama, anaconda, piranha, jaguar, eel, vicuña, and tapir, and to one of the largest known insects in the world, the Titan beetle. The Amazon rainforests possess high biodiversity, with Brazil estimated to contain 10% of Earth's species. 83% of South America's large mammals (megafauna) became extinct at the end of the Pleistocene around 11,000 years ago as part of the Quaternary extinction event, among the highest of any continent, with the casualties including saber-toothed cats, ground sloths, glyptodonts, gomphotheres, the equines Hippidion and Equus neogeus, and all remaining South American native ungulates.

== Politics ==
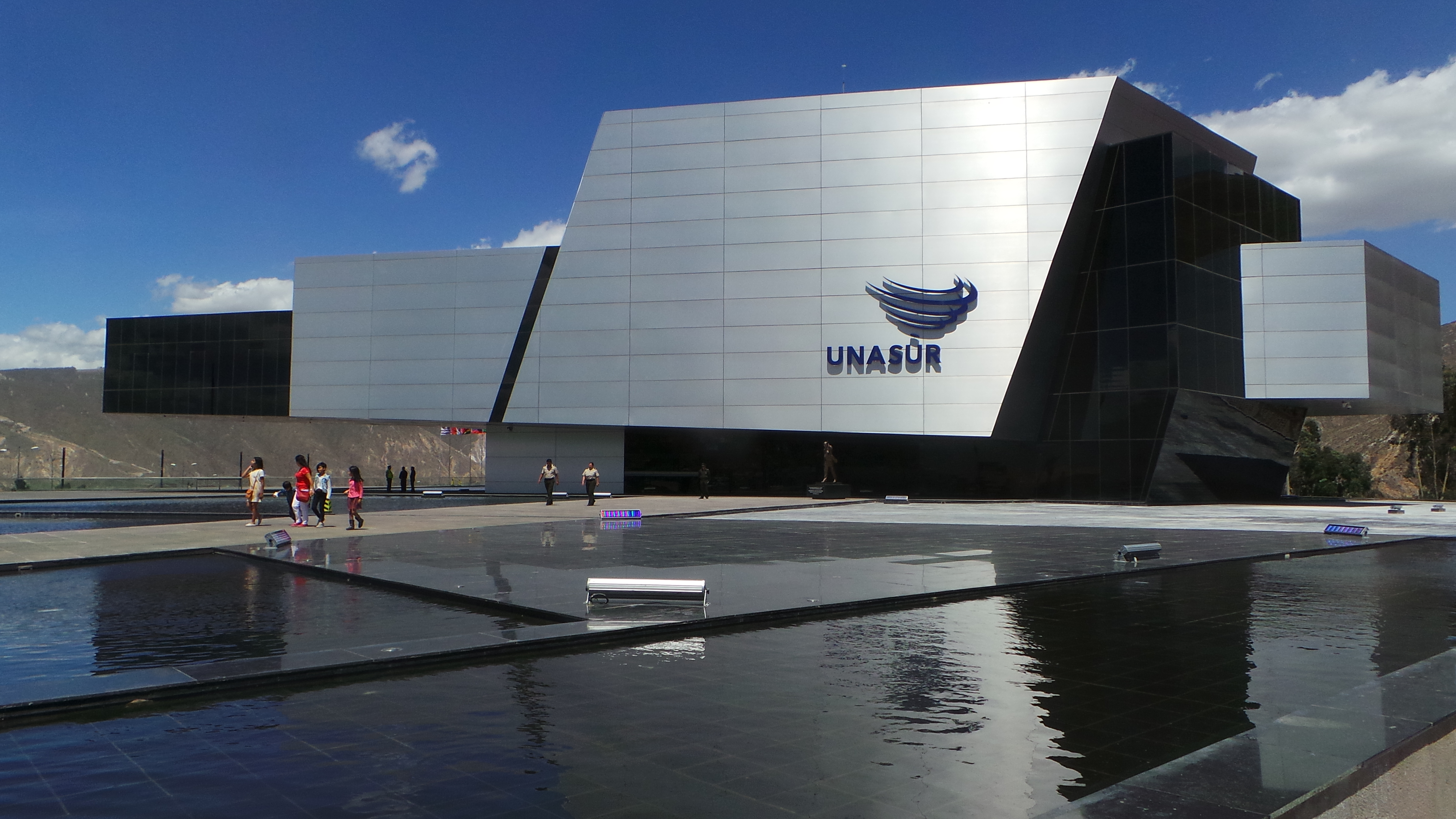
Headquarters of the UNASUR in Quito, Ecuador

Historically, the Hispanic countries were founded as Republican dictatorships led by caudillos. Brazil was a constitutional monarchy for its first 67 years of independence, until a coup d'état proclaimed a republic. In the late 19th century, the most democratic countries were Brazil, Chile, Argentina and Uruguay.

Most South American countries are presidential republics. Guyana and Suriname are parliamentary republics. French Guiana is a French overseas department, while the Falkland Islands and South Georgia and the South Sandwich Islands are British overseas territories. It is currently the only inhabited continent in the world without monarchies; the Empire of Brazil existed during the 19th century, and there was an unsuccessful attempt to establish a Kingdom of Araucanía and Patagonia in southern Argentina and Chile. Also in the twentieth century, Suriname was established as a constituent kingdom of the Kingdom of the Netherlands, and Guyana retained the British monarch as head of state for 4 years after its independence.

Recently, an intergovernmental entity has been formed which aims to merge the two existing customs unions: Mercosur and the Andean Community, thus forming the third-largest trade bloc in the world. This new political organization, known as the Union of South American Nations, seeks to establish free movement of people, economic development, a common defense policy, and the elimination of tariffs.

== List of states and territories ==
Arms	Flag	Country / Territory	Area (Note: Land areas and population estimates are taken from the 2008 World Factbook, which currently uses July 2007 data, unless otherwise noted.)	Population (2021)	Population density	Capital	Name(s) in official language(s)
Argentina	(Argentina)	Argentina	2,766,890 km^{2} (1,068,300 sq mi)	45,276,780	14.3/km^{2} (37/sq mi)	Buenos Aires	Argentina
Bolivia	(Bolivia)	Bolivia	1,098,580 km^{2} (424,160 sq mi)	12,079,472	8.4/km^{2} (22/sq mi)	La Paz, Sucre (Note: La Paz is the administrative capital of Bolivia; Sucre is the constitutional and judicial capital of Bolivia.)	Bolivia / Mborivia / Wuliwya / Puliwya
Brazil	(Brazil)	Brazil	8,514,877 km^{2} (3,287,612 sq mi)	214,326,223	22/km^{2} (57/sq mi)	Brasília	Brasil
Chile	(Chile)	Chile (Note: Includes Easter Island in the Pacific Ocean, a Chilean territory frequently reckoned in Oceania.)	756,950 km^{2} (292,260 sq mi)	19,493,184	22/km^{2} (57/sq mi)	Santiago (Note: Santiago is the administrative capital of Chile; Valparaíso is the site of legislative meetings.)	Chile
Colombia	(Colombia)	Colombia	1,141,748 km^{2} (440,831 sq mi)	51,516,562	40/km^{2} (100/sq mi)	Bogotá	Colombia
Ecuador	(Ecuador)	Ecuador	283,560 km^{2} (109,480 sq mi)	17,797,737	53.8/km^{2} (139/sq mi)	Quito	Ecuador / Ikwayur / Ekuatur
Falkland Islands	(Falkland Islands)	Falkland Islands (United Kingdom)	12,173 km^{2} (4,700 sq mi)	3,764	0.26/km^{2} (0.67/sq mi)	Stanley	Falkland Islands
French Guiana	(French Guiana)	French Guiana (France) (Note: The territory has been fully integrated into the French central state and the European Union.)	91,000 km^{2} (35,000 sq mi)	297,449	2.1/km^{2} (5.4/sq mi)	Cayenne (Préfecture)	Guyane
Guyana	(Guyana)	Guyana	214,999 km^{2} (83,012 sq mi)	804,567	3.5/km^{2} (9.1/sq mi)	Georgetown	Guyana
Paraguay	(Paraguay)	Paraguay	406,750 km^{2} (157,050 sq mi)	6,703,799	15.6/km^{2} (40/sq mi)	Asunción	Paraguay/Paraguái
Peru	(Peru)	Peru	1,285,220 km^{2} (496,230 sq mi)	33,715,471	22/km^{2} (57/sq mi)	Lima	Perú/Piruw/Piruw
South Georgia and the South Sandwich Islands	(South Georgia and the South Sandwich Islands)	South Georgia and the South Sandwich Islands (United Kingdom) (Note: South Georgia and the South Sandwich Islands in the South Atlantic Ocean have no permanent population, only hosting a periodic contingent of about 100 researchers and visitors.)	3,093 km^{2} (1,194 sq mi)	20	0/km^{2} (0/sq mi)	King Edward Point	South Georgia and the South Sandwich Islands
Suriname	(Suriname)	Suriname	163,270 km^{2} (63,040 sq mi)	612,985	3/km^{2} (7.8/sq mi)	Paramaribo	Suriname
Uruguay	(Uruguay)	Uruguay	176,220 km^{2} (68,040 sq mi)	3,426,260	19.4/km^{2} (50/sq mi)	Montevideo	Uruguay
Venezuela	(Venezuela)	Venezuela	916,445 km^{2} (353,841 sq mi)	28,199,867	27.8/km^{2} (72/sq mi)	Caracas	Venezuela
Total			17,824,513 km^{2} (6,882,083 sq mi)	434,254,119	21.5/km^{2} (56/sq mi)		

== Economy ==
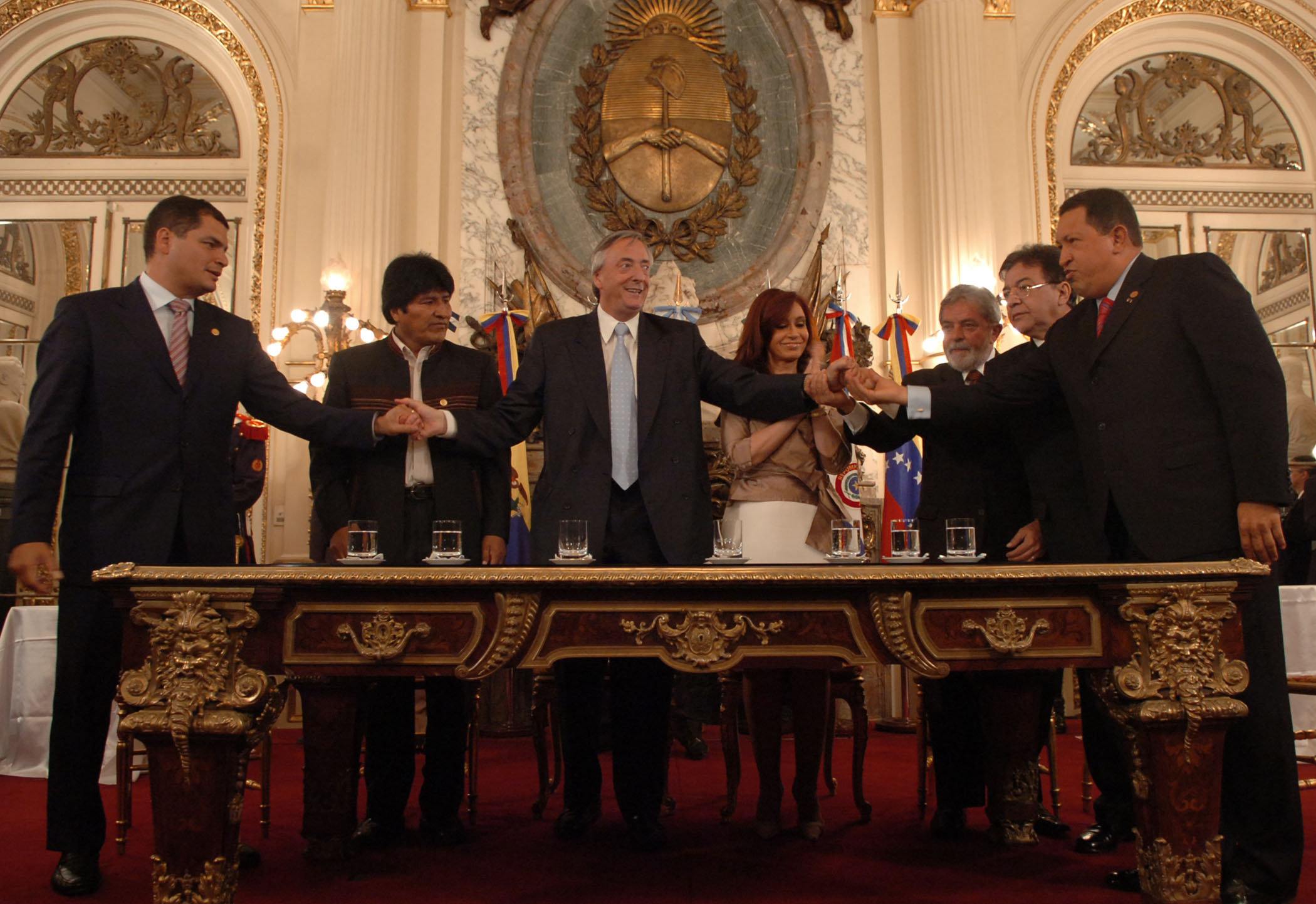
Rafael Correa, Evo Morales, Néstor Kirchner, Cristina Fernández, Luiz Inácio Lula da Silva, Nicanor Duarte, and Hugo Chávez signed the founding charter of the Bank of the South.

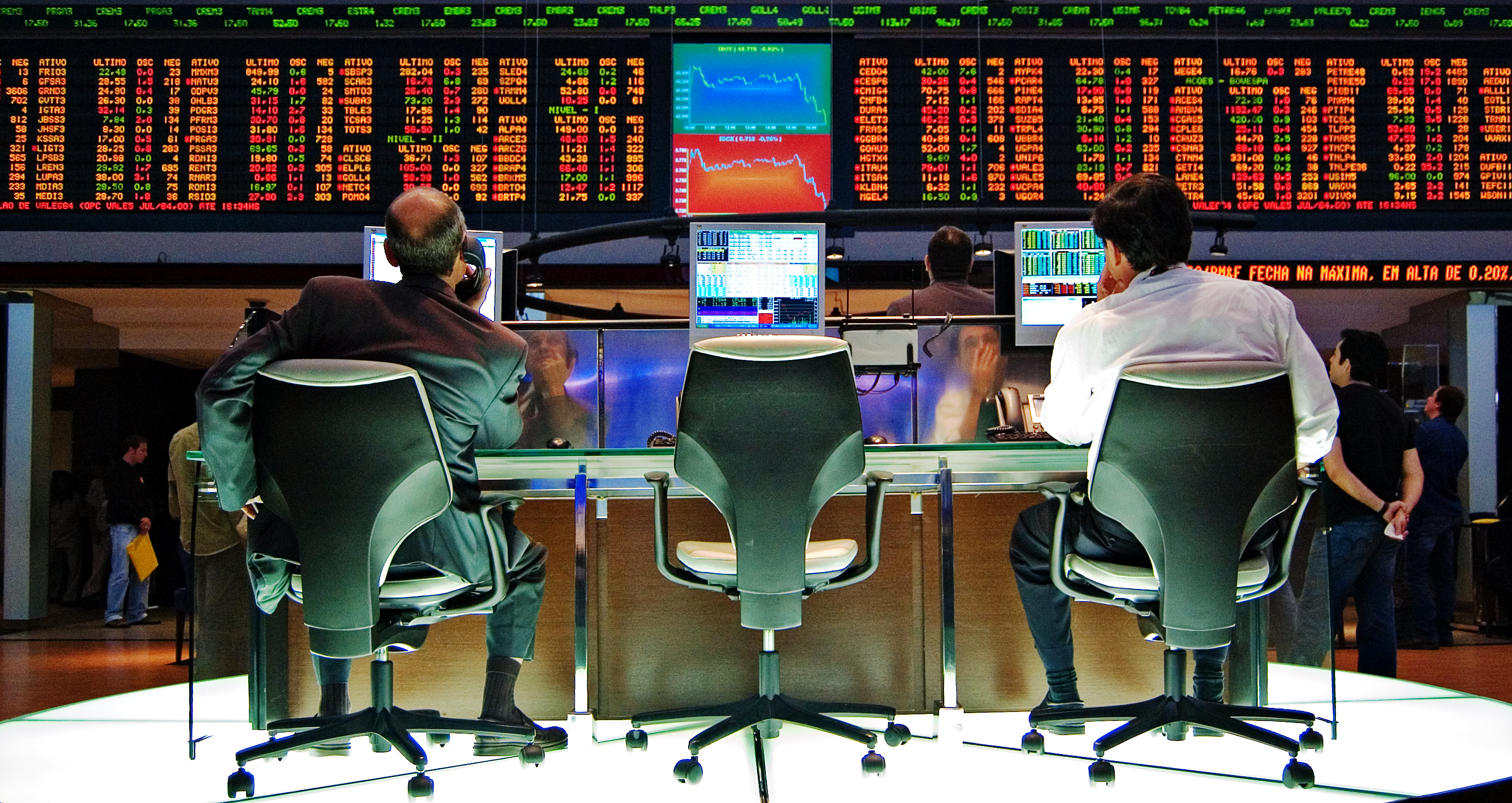
Trading panel of the São Paulo Stock Exchange is the second biggest in the Americas and 13th in the world.

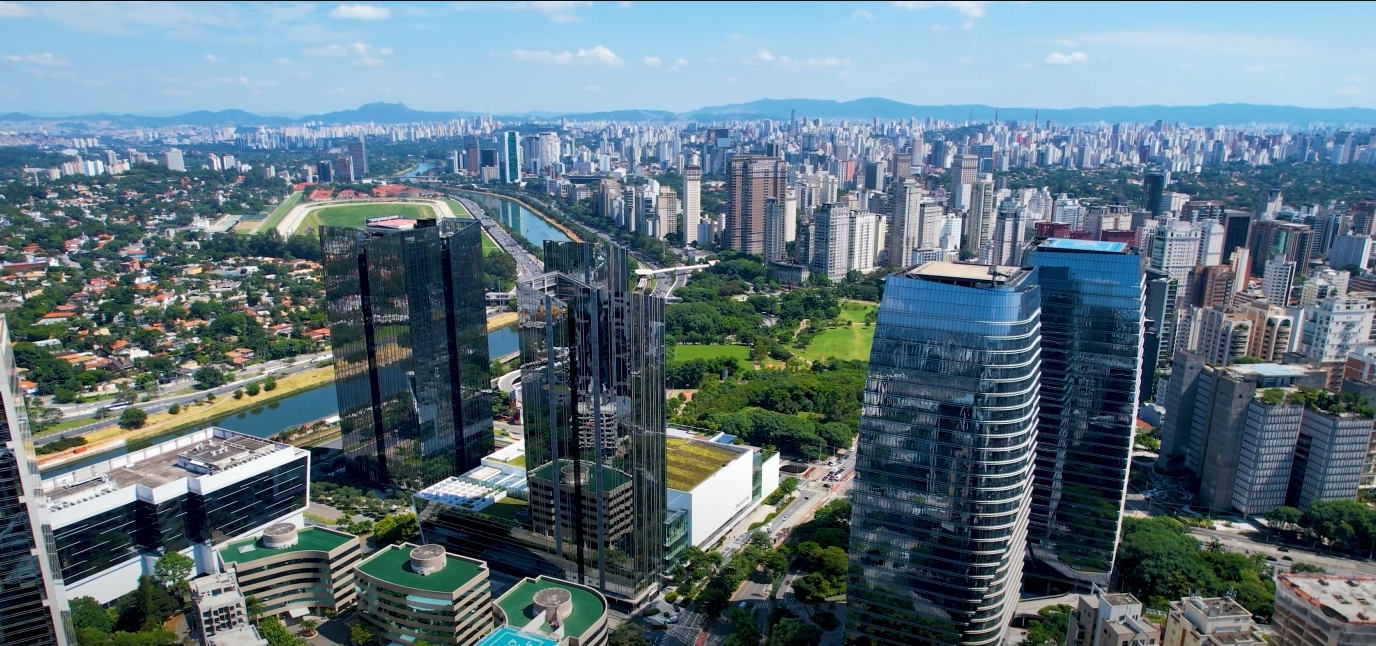
São Paulo, Brazil, one of the largest financial centers in the world

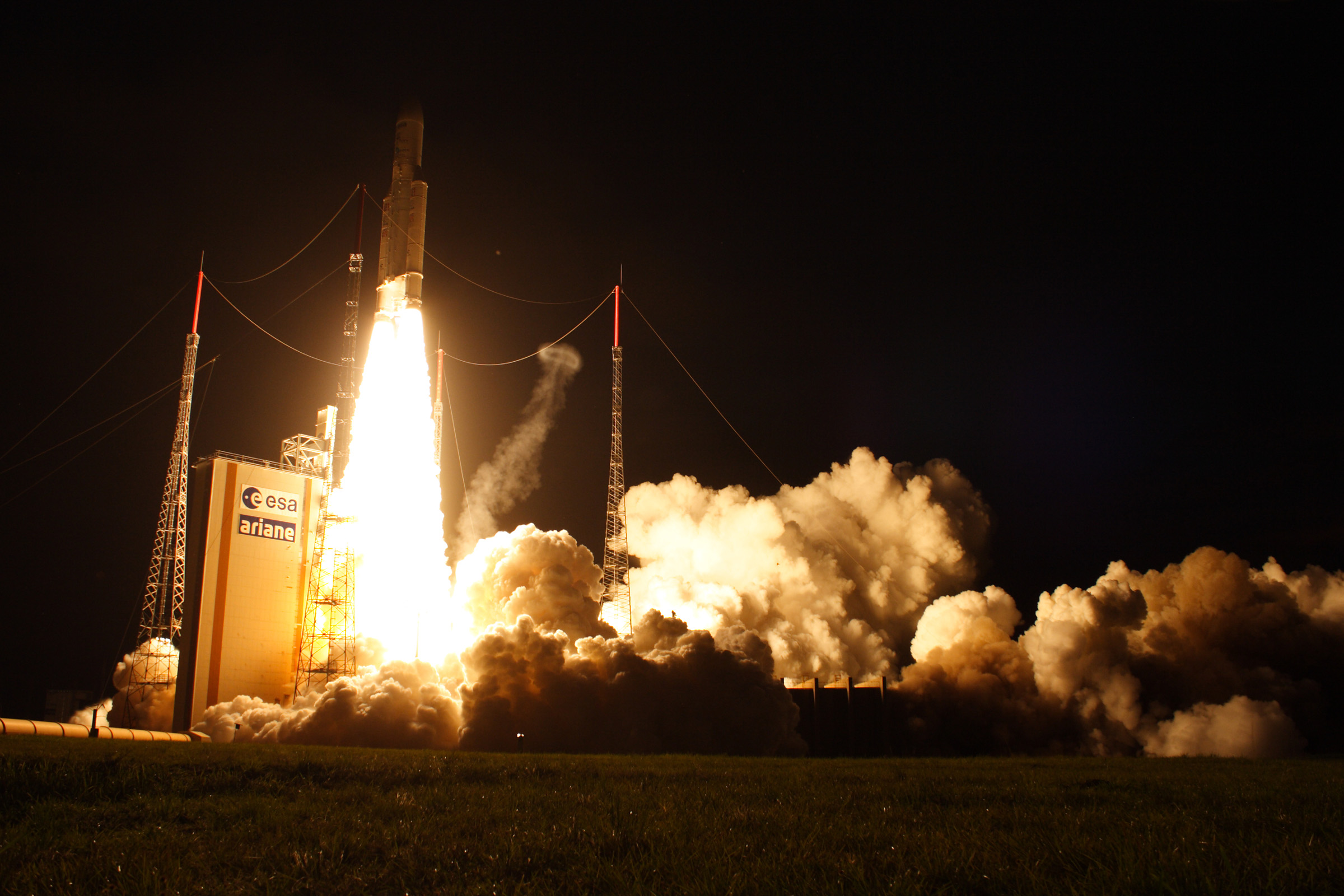
Launch at the Kourou Space Centre in French Guiana

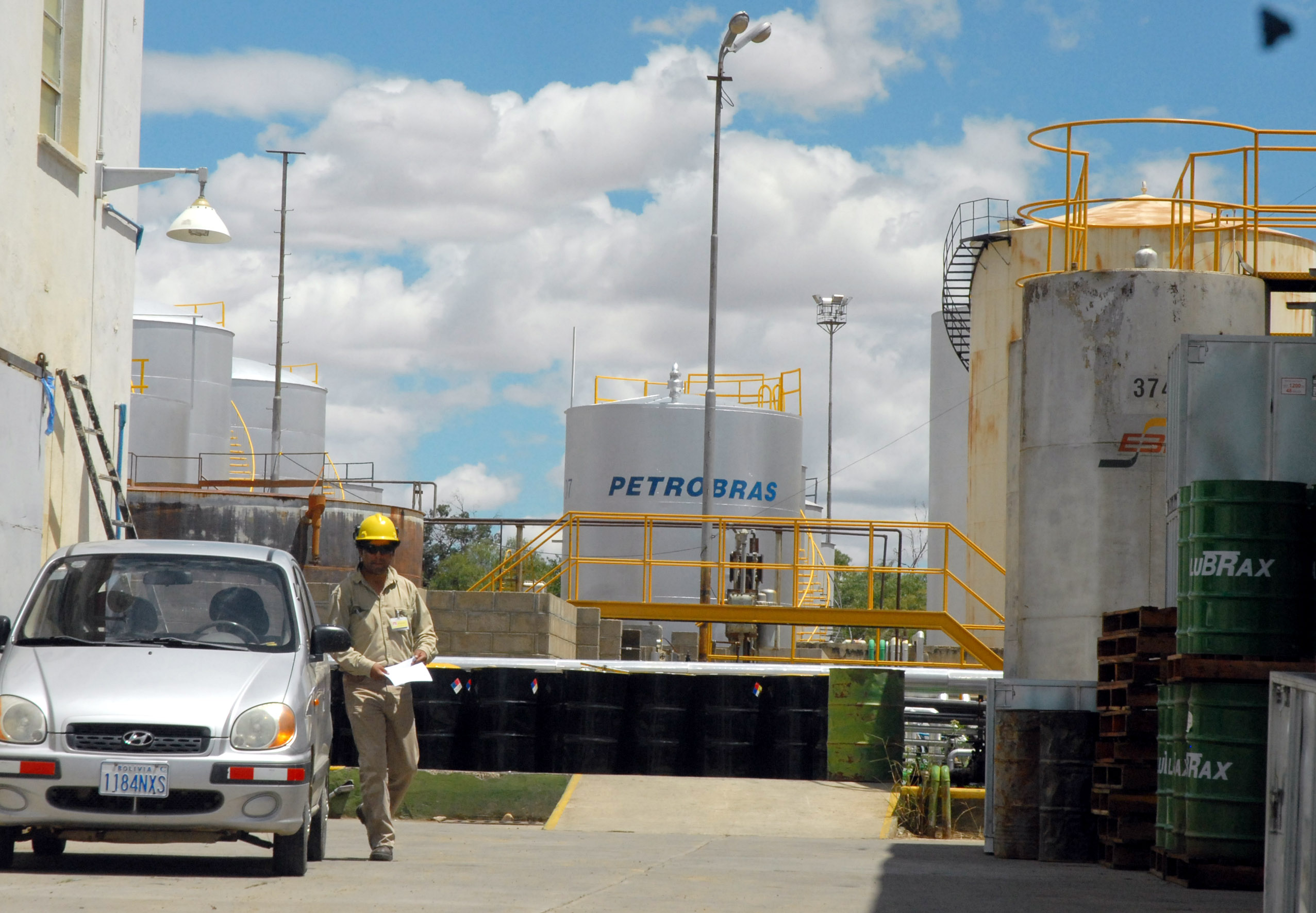
Refinery of Brazilian state-owned Petrobras in Cochabamba, Bolivia

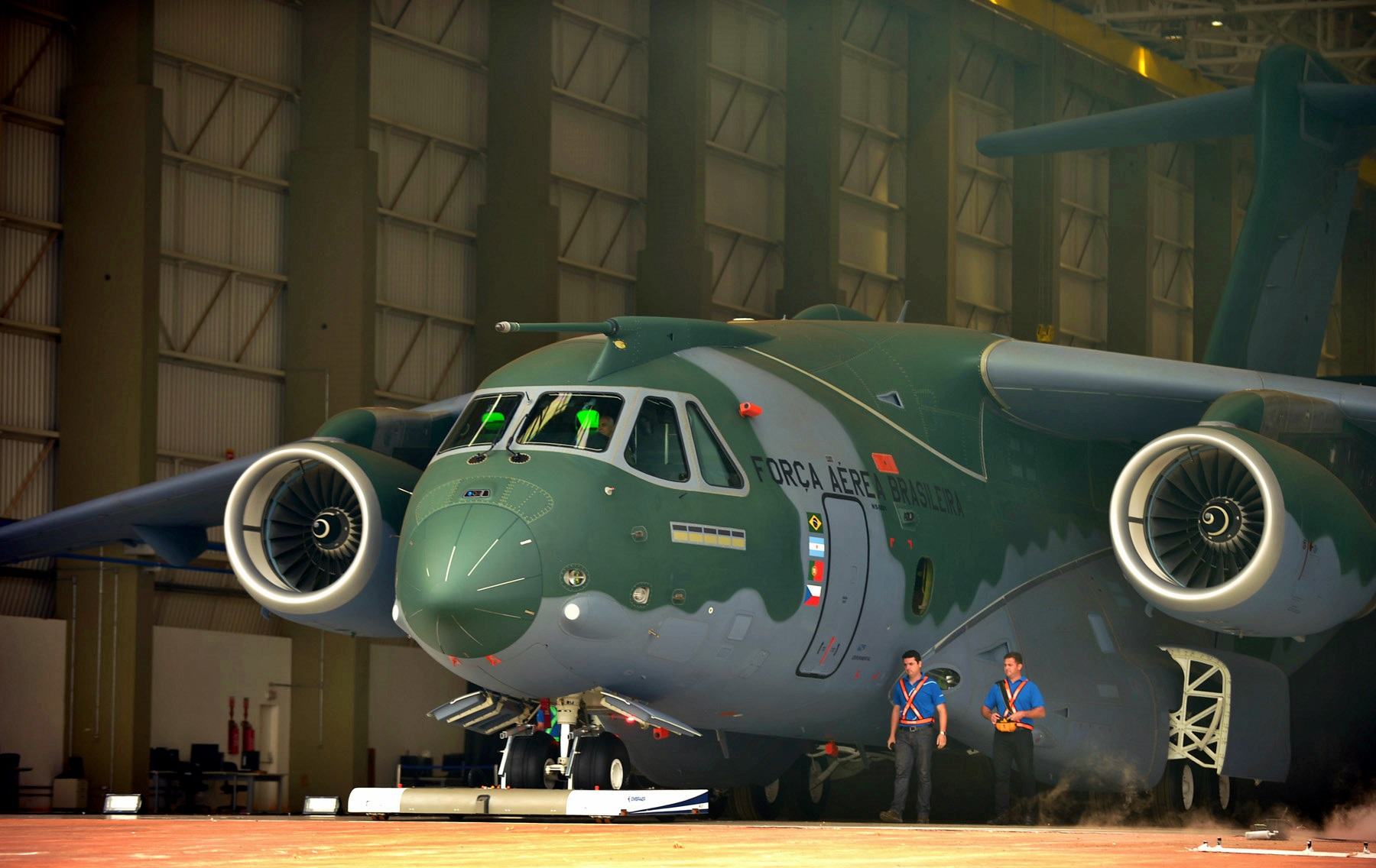
KC-390 is the largest military transport aircraft produced in South America by the Brazilian company Embraer.

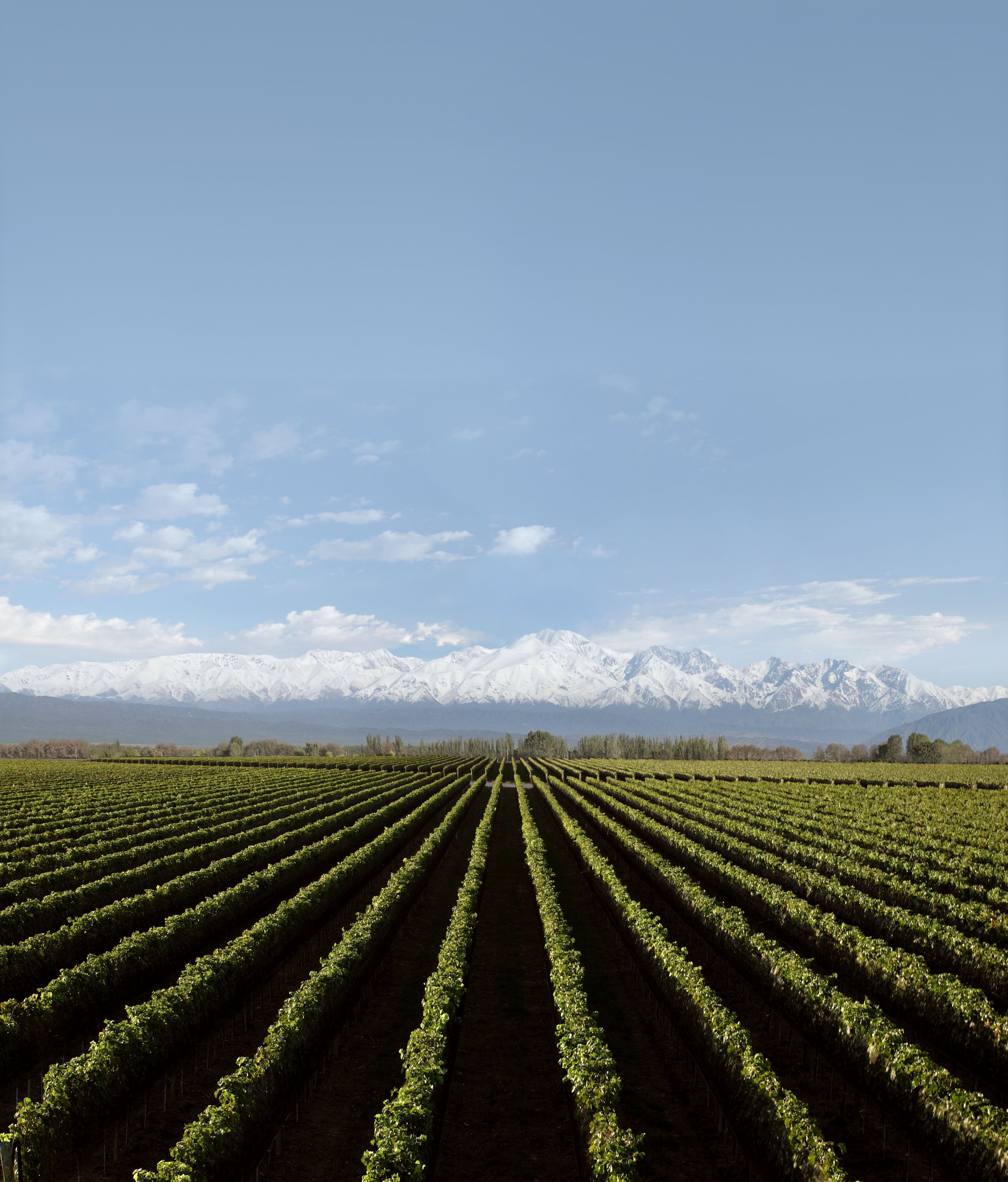
Vineyard in Luján de Cuyo, province of Mendoza, Argentina

Country	GDP (nominal) $bn 2023	GDP (PPP) $bn 2023	GDP PPP per capita $1,000 2023	Merchandise exports $bn 2022	Human Development Index 2021	% with less than $2.15 per day 2021
Argentina	622	1,240	27	103	0.84	1
Bolivia	47	125	10	15	0.69	2
Brazil	2,130	4,100	20	380	0.75	6
Chile	344	600	30	107	0.86	0.7
Colombia	364	1,000	19	72	0.75	7
Ecuador	120	243	13	36	0.74	3
Falkland Islands		0.2	71			
French Guiana	5		20			
Guyana	16	49	61	5	0.71	
Paraguay	44	117	16	15	0.72	1.3
Peru	265	550	16	71	0.76	3
Suriname	3.5	11	18	3	0.73	
Uruguay	76	103	29	23	0.81	0.1
Venezuela	92	21	8	23	0.69	
Total	4,100	8,200	19	850		

Since 1930, the continent has experienced growth and diversification in most economic sectors. Most agricultural and livestock products are destined for the domestic market and local consumption. However, the export of agricultural products is essential for the balance of trade in most countries.

The main agrarian crops are export crops, such as soy and wheat. The production of staple foods such as vegetables, corn, or beans is large, but focused on domestic consumption. Livestock raising for meat exports is significant in Argentina, Paraguay, Uruguay and Colombia. In tropical regions, the most important crops are coffee, cocoa and bananas, mainly in Brazil, Colombia and Ecuador. Traditionally, the countries producing sugar for export are Peru, Guyana and Suriname, and in Brazil, sugar cane is also used to make ethanol. On the coast of Peru, northeast and south of Brazil, cotton is grown. 51% of South America's land surface is covered by forest. Transnational companies have settled in the Amazon rainforest to exploit timber destined for export.

The Pacific coastal waters are the most important for commercial fishing. The anchovy catch reaches thousands of tonnes, and tuna is abundant; Peru is a major exporter. The capture of crustaceans is large, particularly in northeastern Brazil and Chile.

Brazil and Argentina are part of the G20 industrial countries, while only Brazil is part of the G8+5 (the most powerful and influential nations in the world). In the tourism sector, negotiations began in 2005 to promote tourism and increase air connections within the region. Punta del Este, Florianópolis and Mar del Plata are among the largest resorts in South America.

The most industrialized countries in South America are Brazil, Argentina, Colombia, and Chile, respectively. These countries alone account for more than 80% of the region's economy. Industries in South America developed significantly from the 1930s, when the Great Depression in the United States and elsewhere boosted industrial production on the continent. The region partially moved away from agriculture and began to achieve high rates of economic growth that remained until the early 1990s, when they slowed due to political instabilities and economic crises.

Since the end of the economic crisis in Brazil and Argentina between 1998 and 2002, which led to economic recession, rising unemployment, and falling income, the industrial and service sectors have recovered. South America has shown good signs of economic stability, with controlled inflation and exchange rates, continuous growth, a decrease in social inequality and unemployment – factors that favor industry.

The main industries are: electronics, textiles, food, automotive, metallurgy, aviation, naval, clothing, beverage, steel, tobacco, timber, chemical, among others.

The economic gap between rich and poor in most South American nations is larger than in most other continents. The richest 10% receive over 40% of the nation's income in Bolivia, Brazil, and Colombia, while the poorest 20% receive 4% or less. This wide gap can be seen in large South American cities where makeshift shacks and slums lie in the vicinity of skyscrapers and luxury apartments; many South Americans live on less than $2 per day.

=== Agriculture ===
The four countries with the strongest agriculture are Brazil, Argentina, Chile, and Colombia. Currently:

- Brazil is the world's largest producer of sugarcane, soy, coffee, orange, guaraná, açaí and Brazil nut; is one of the top 5 producers of maize, papaya, tobacco, pineapple, banana, cotton, beans, coconut, watermelon, lemon and yerba mate; is one of the top 10 world producers of cocoa, cashew, avocado, tangerine, persimmon, mango, guava, rice, oat, sorghum and tomato; and is one of the top 15 world producers of grape, apple, melon, peanut, fig, peach, onion, palm oil and natural rubber;
- Argentina is the world's largest producer of yerba mate; is one of the five largest producers in the world of soy, maize, sunflower seed, lemon and pear, one of the 10 largest producers in the world of barley, grape, artichoke, tobacco and cotton, and one of the 15 largest producers in the world of wheat, oat, chickpea, sugarcane, sorghum and grapefruit;
- Chile is one of the five largest world producers of cherry and cranberry, and one of the 10 largest world producers of grape, apple, kiwi, peach, plum and hazelnut, focusing on exporting high-value fruits;
- Colombia is one of the five largest producers in the world of coffee, avocado and palm oil, and one of the 10 largest producers in the world of sugarcane, banana, pineapple and cocoa;
- Peru is the world's largest producer of quinoa; is one of the five largest producers of avocado, blueberry, artichoke and asparagus; one of the 10 largest producers in the world of coffee and cocoa; one of the 15 largest producers in the world of potato and pineapple, and also has a considerable production of grape, sugarcane, rice, banana, maize and cassava; its agriculture is considerably diversified;
- Paraguay's agriculture is currently developing, being the sixth largest producer of soy in the world and entering the list of the 20 largest producers of maize and sugarcane.

Brazil is the world's largest exporter of chicken meat: 3.8 million tonnes in 2019. The country is the holder of the second largest herd of cattle in the world, 22% of the world herd. The country was the second largest producer of beef in 2019, responsible for 15% of global production. It was also the third largest world producer of milk in 2018, with 35 billion liters. In 2019, Brazil was the 4th largest pork producer in the world, with almost 4 million tonnes. In 2018, Argentina was the fourth largest producer of beef in the world, with a production of 3 million tonnes (behind only the United States, Brazil and China).

In chicken meat production, Argentina ranks among the 15 largest producers in the world, and Peru and Colombia among the 20 biggest producers. In beef production, Colombia is one of the 20 largest producers in the world. In honey production, Argentina ranks among the five largest. In cow's milk, Argentina ranks among the 20 largest producers.

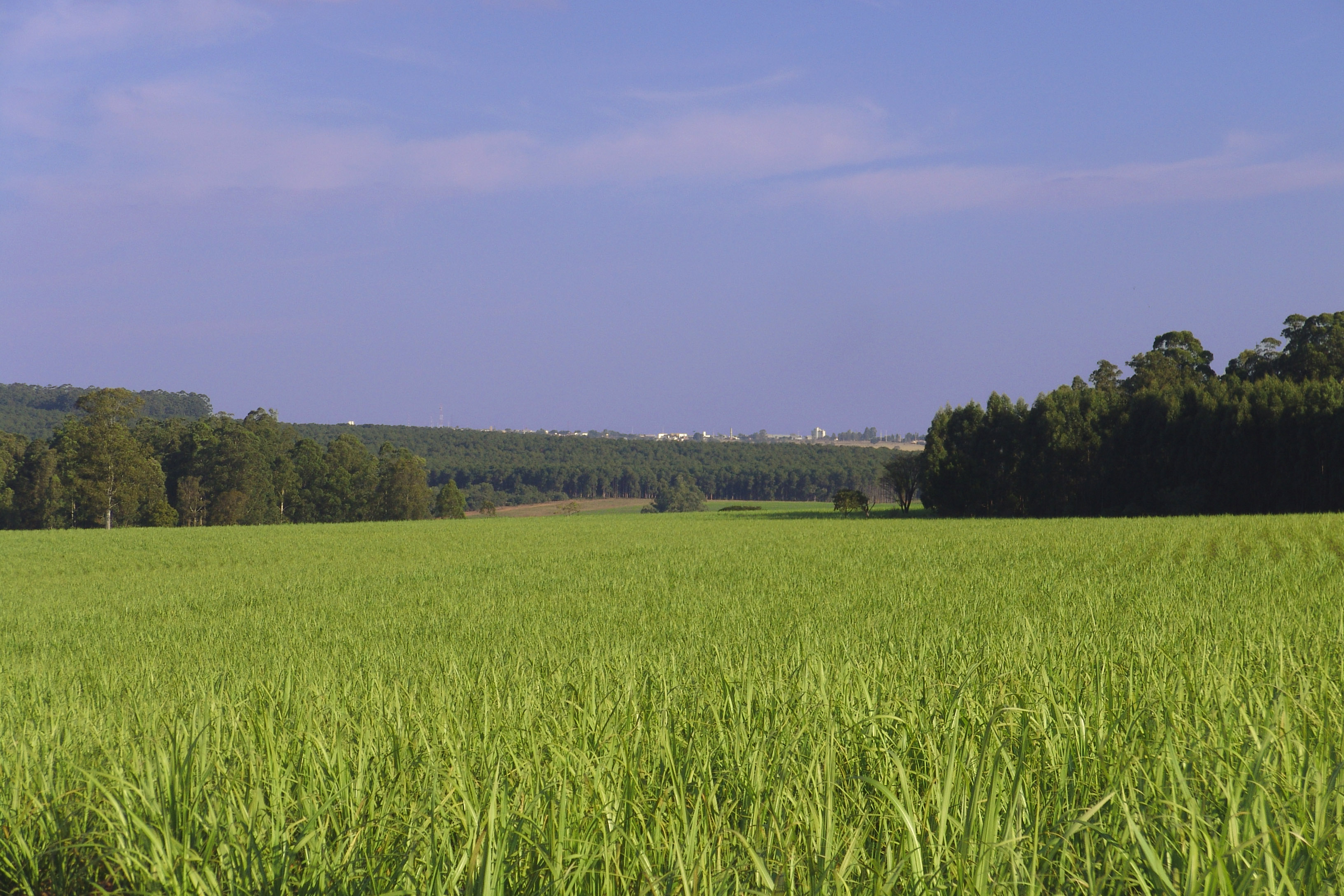
Sugarcane plantation in São Paulo. In 2018, Brazil was the world's largest producer, with 746 million tonnes. South America produces half of the world's sugarcane.

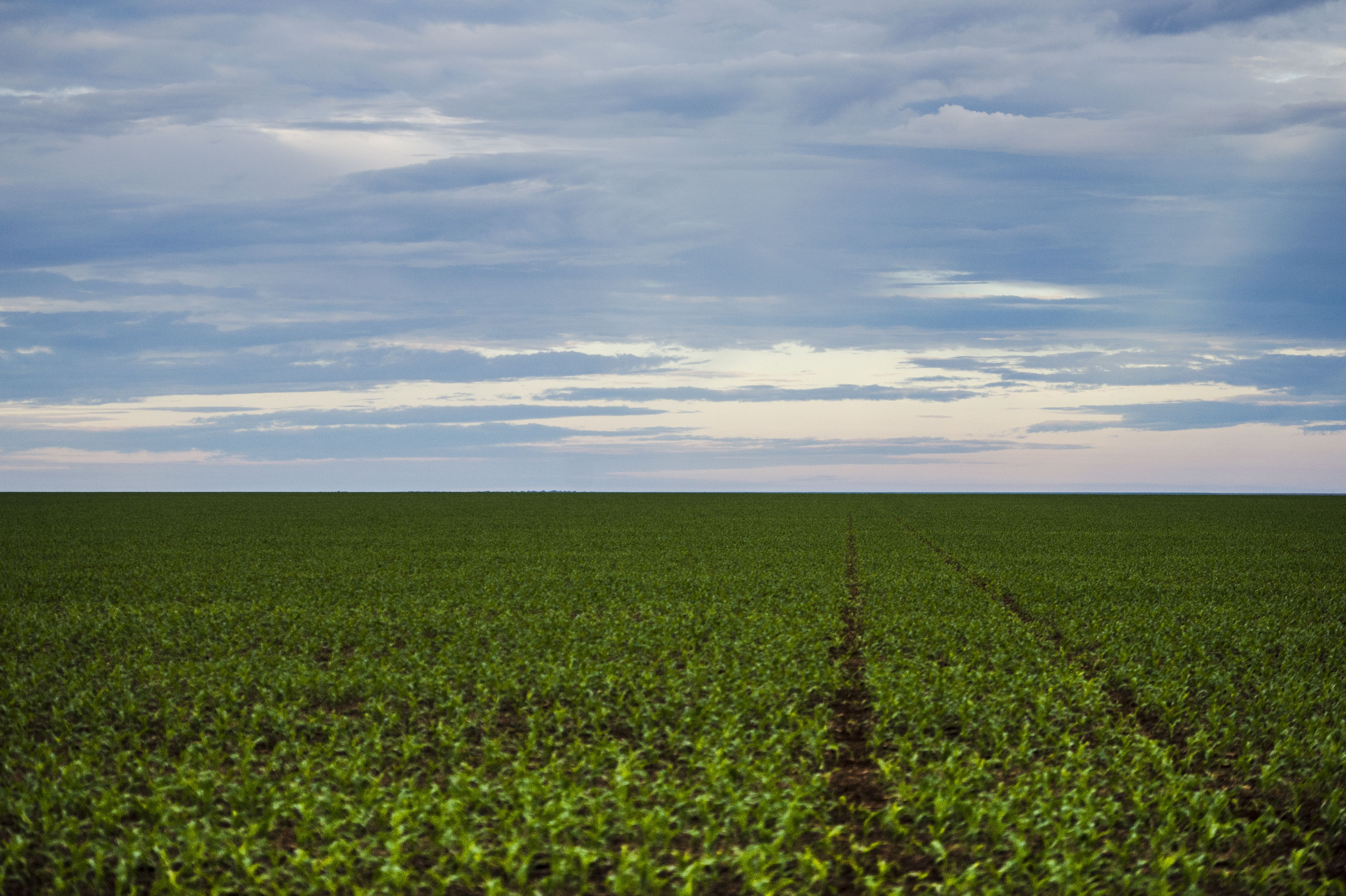
Soy plantation in Mato Grosso. In 2020, Brazil was the world's largest producer, with 130 million tonnes. South America produces half of the world's soybeans.

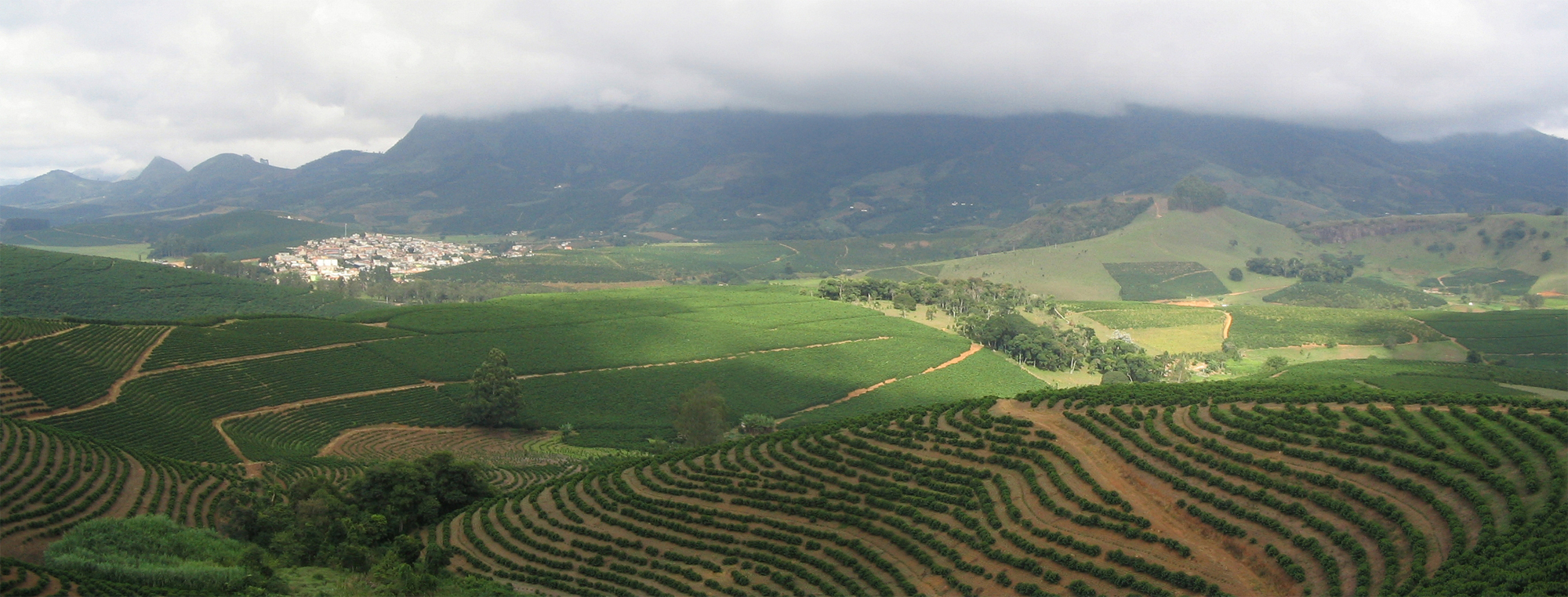
Coffee in Minas Gerais. In 2018, Brazil was the world's largest producer, with 3.5 million tonnes. South America produces half of the world's coffee.

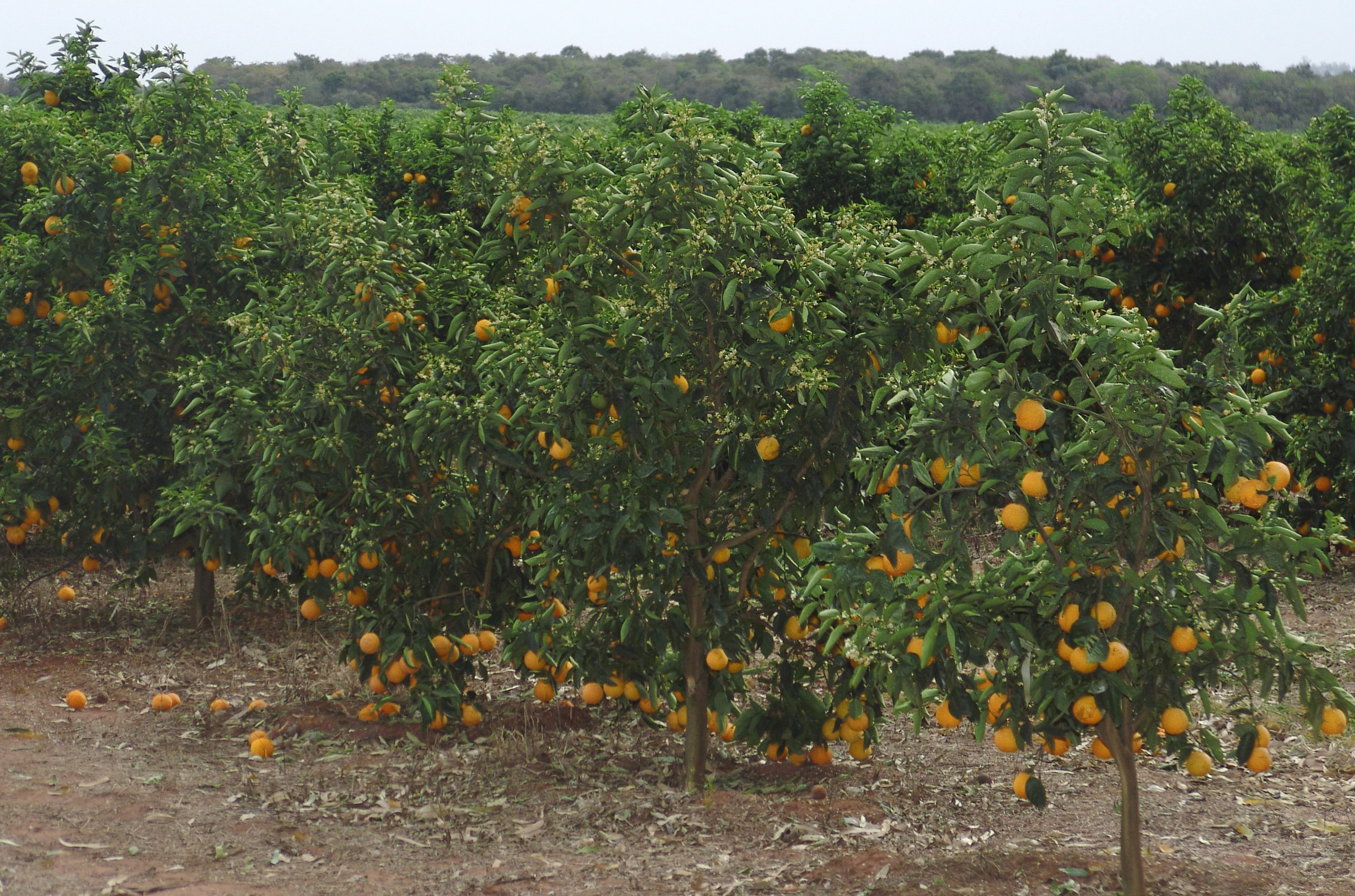
Orange in São Paulo. In 2018, Brazil was the world's largest producer, with 17 million tonnes. South America produces 25% of the world's oranges.

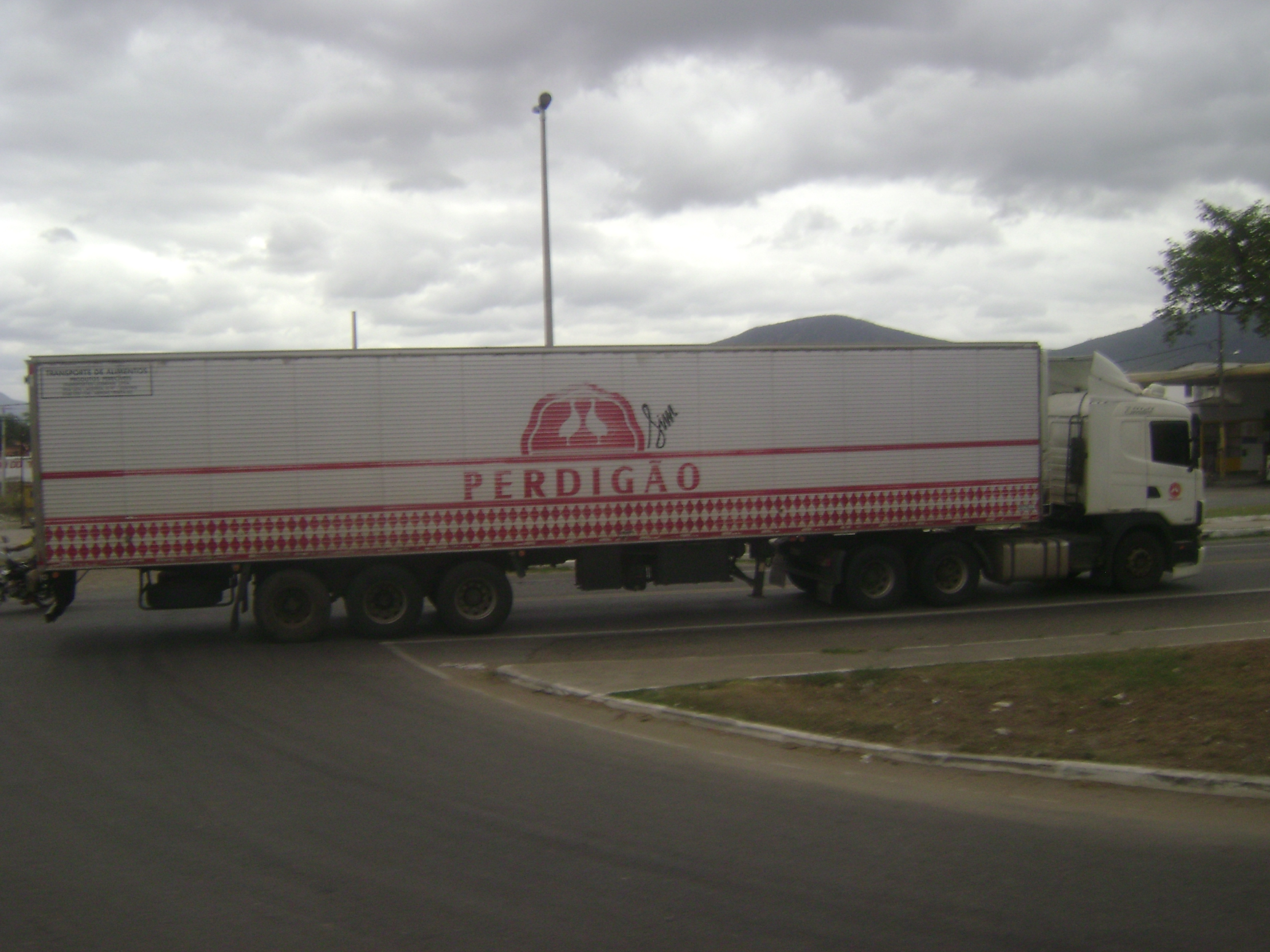
Truck of a meat company in Brazil. South America produces 20% of the world's beef and chicken meat.

=== Manufacturing ===
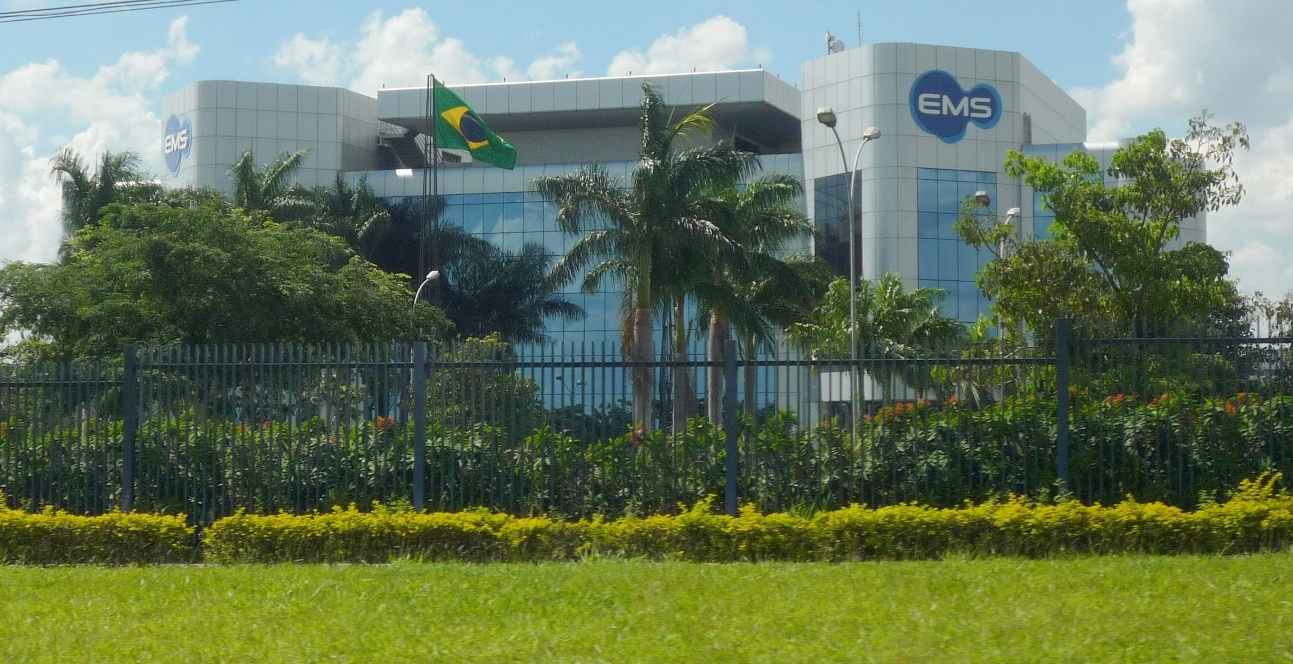
EMS, the largest Brazilian pharmaceutical company

The World Bank annually lists the top manufacturing countries by total manufacturing value. According to the 2019 list, Brazil has the thirteenth most valuable industry in the world (US$174 billion), Venezuela the thirtieth largest (US$58.2 billion; however, it depends on oil to obtain this value), Argentina the 31st largest (US$57.7 billion), Colombia the 46th largest (US$35.4 billion), Peru the 50th largest (US$28.7 billion), and Chile the 51st largest (US$28.3 billion).

Brazil has the third-largest manufacturing sector in the Americas. Accounting for 29 percent of GDP, Brazil's industries range from automobiles, steel, and petrochemicals to computers, aircraft (Embraer), food, pharmaceuticals, footwear, metallurgy, and consumer durables. In the food industry, in 2019, Brazil was the second largest exporter of processed foods in the world. In 2016, the country was the 2nd largest producer of pulp and the 8th largest producer of paper. In the footwear industry, in 2019, Brazil ranked 4th among world producers. In 2019, the country was the 8th largest producer of vehicles and the 9th largest producer of steel in the world. In 2018, the chemical industry of Brazil was the 8th largest in the world. Although Brazil was in 2013 among the five largest producers of textiles in the world, its textile industry still lacks proper integration in world trade.

=== Mining ===
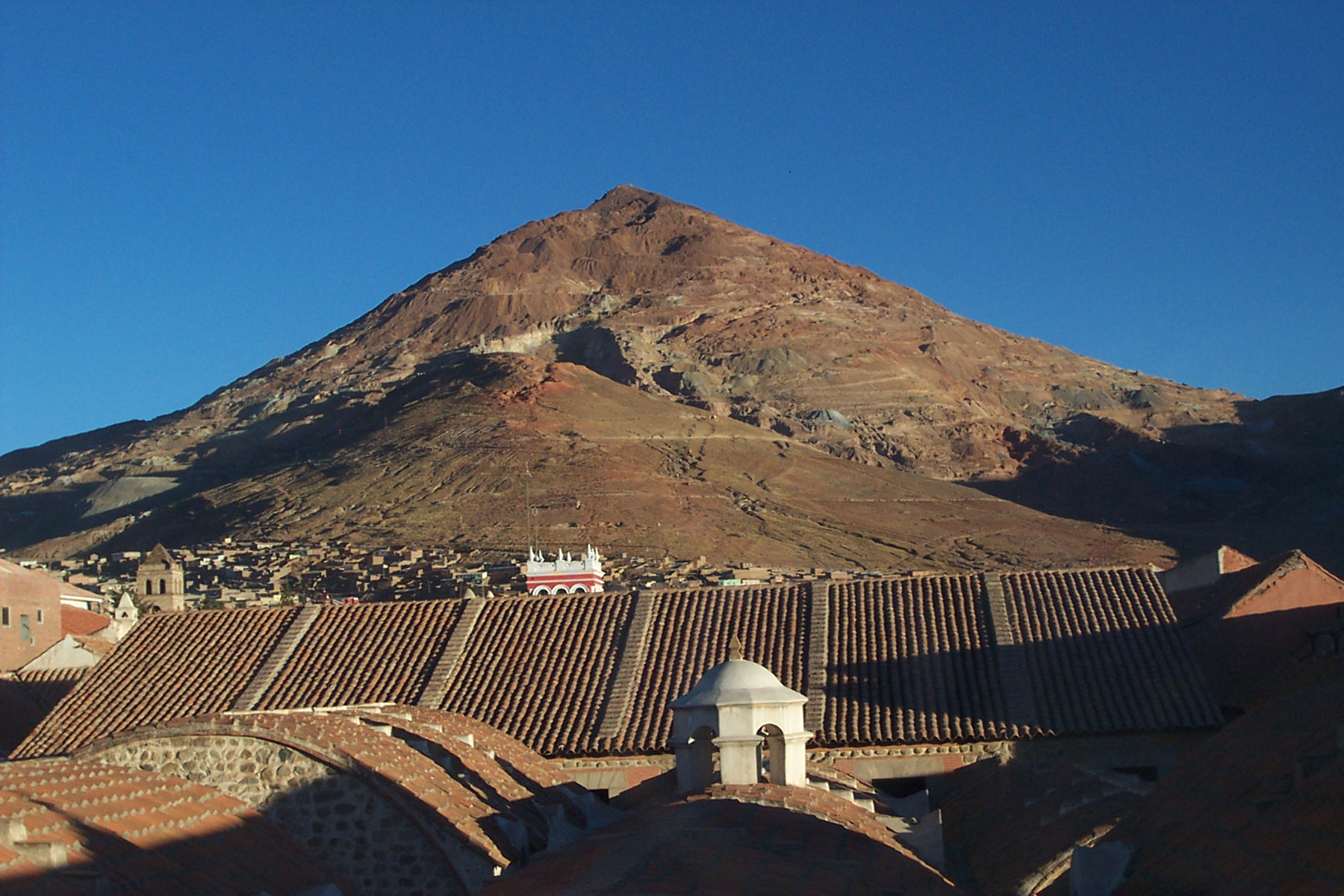
Cerro Rico, Potosi, Bolivia, still a major silver mine

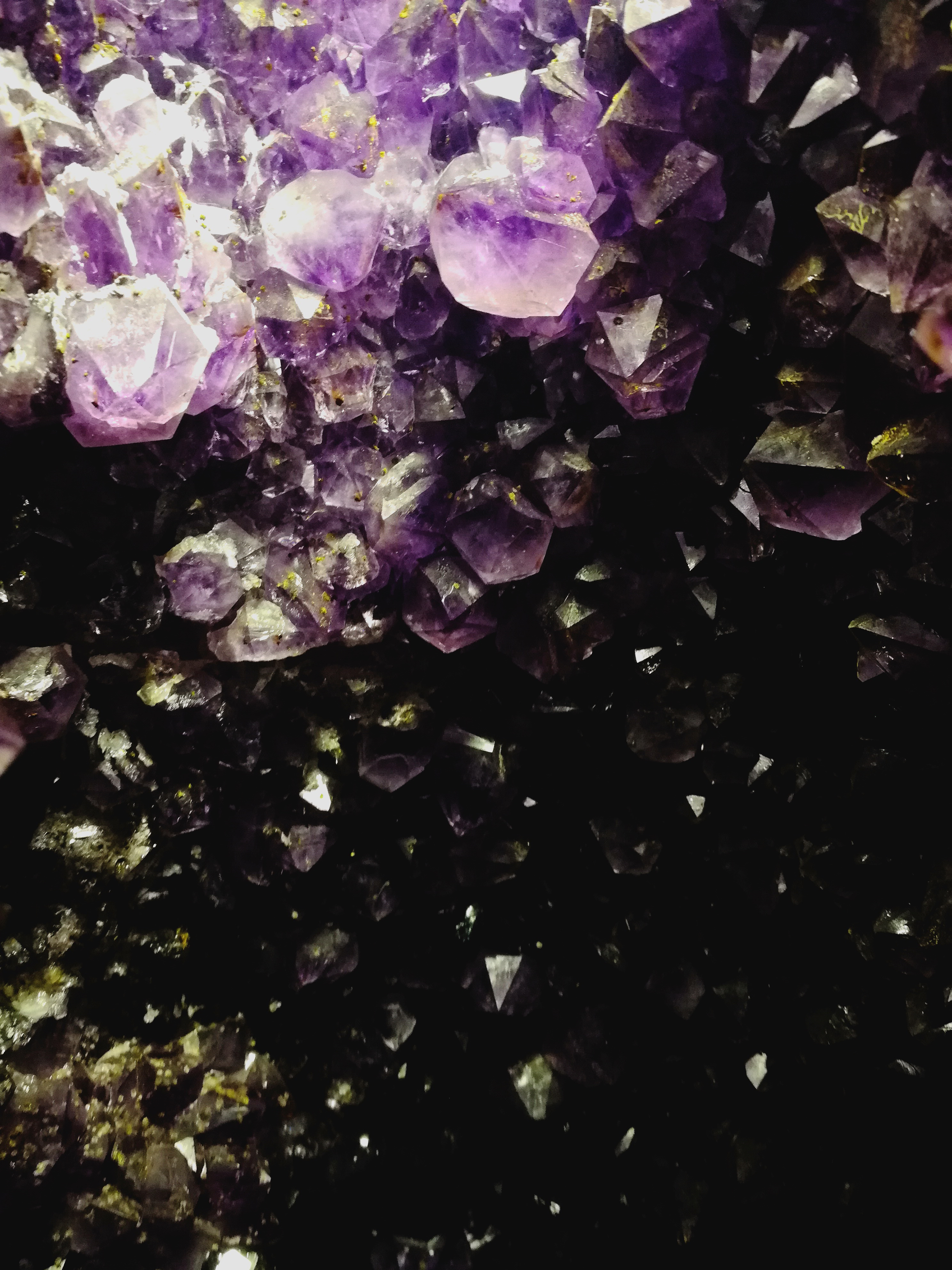
Amethyst mine in Ametista do Sul. South America is a major producer of gems such as amethyst, topaz, emerald, aquamarine, and tourmaline.

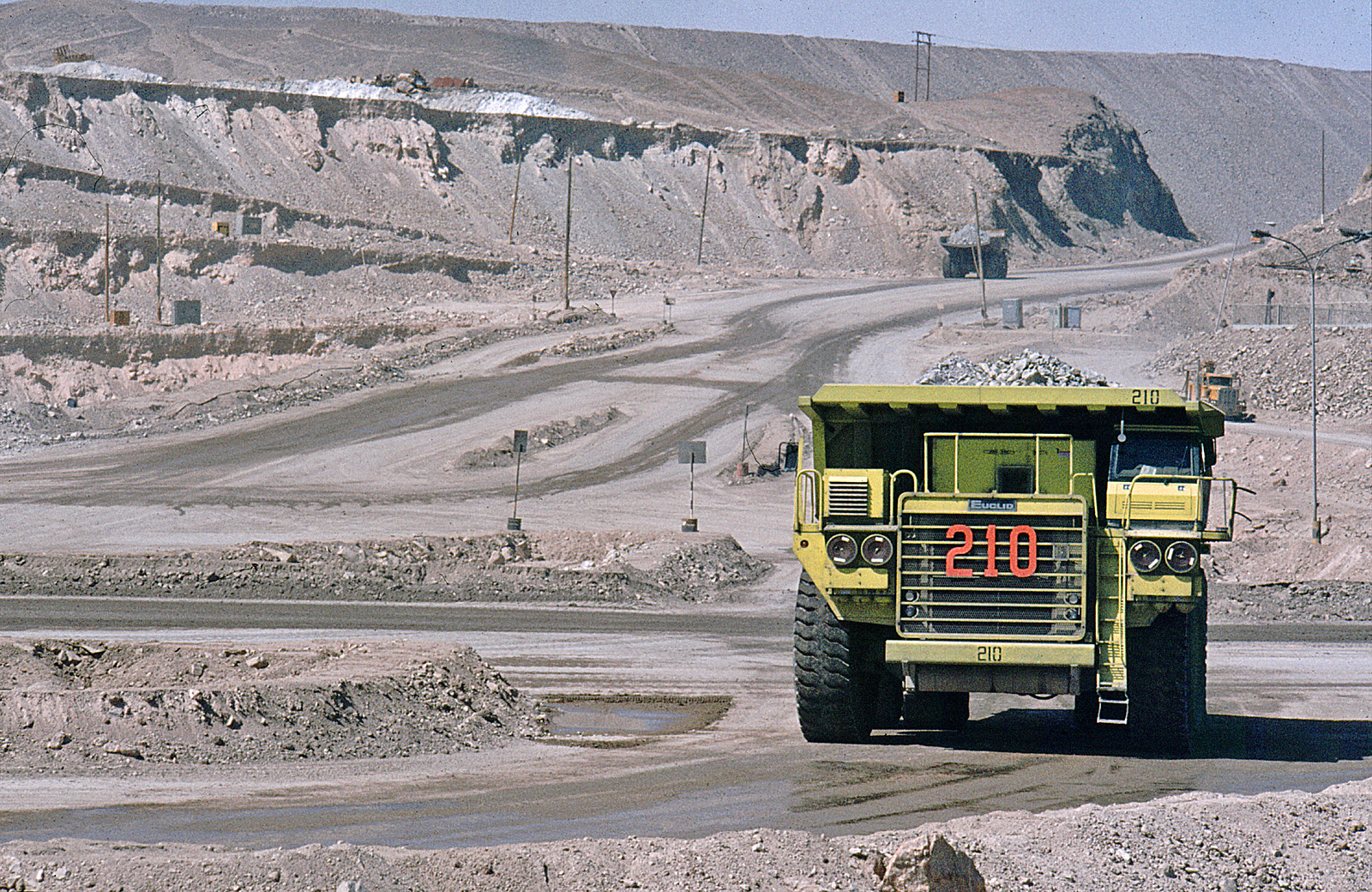
Chuquicamata is the largest open-pit mine in the world, near the city of Calama in Chile.

Mining is one of the most important economic sectors in South America, especially for Chile, Peru and Bolivia, whose economies are highly dependent on this sector. The continent is a large producer of gold (mainly in Peru, Brazil and Argentina); silver (mainly in Peru, Chile, Bolivia and Argentina); copper (mainly in Chile, Peru and Brazil); iron ore (Brazil, Peru and Chile); zinc (Peru, Bolivia and Brazil); molybdenum (Chile and Peru); lithium (Chile, Argentina and Brazil); lead (Peru and Bolivia); bauxite (Brazil); tin (Peru, Bolivia and Brazil); manganese (Brazil); antimony (Bolivia and Ecuador); nickel (Brazil); niobium (Brazil); rhenium (Chile); iodine (Chile), among others.

Brazil stands out in the extraction of iron ore (where it is the second largest producer and exporter in the world – iron ore is usually one of the three export products that generate the greatest value in the country's trade balance), copper, gold, bauxite (one of the five largest producers in the world), manganese (one of the five largest producers in the world), tin (one of the largest producers in the world), niobium (concentrates 98% of reserves known to the world) and nickel. In terms of gemstones, Brazil is the world's largest producer of amethyst, topaz, agate and one of the main producers of tourmaline, emerald, aquamarine, garnet and opal.

Chile contributes about a third of the world's copper production. In addition to copper, Chile was, in 2019, the world's largest producer of iodine and rhenium, the second largest producer of lithium and molybdenum, the sixth largest producer of silver, the seventh largest producer of salt, the eighth largest producer of potash, the thirteenth largest producer of sulfur and the thirteenth largest producer of iron ore in the world.

In 2019, Peru was the 2nd largest world producer of copper and silver, 8th largest world producer of gold, 3rd largest world producer of lead, 2nd largest world producer of zinc, 4th largest world producer of tin, 5th largest world producer of boron and 4th largest world producer of molybdenum.

In 2019, Bolivia was the 8th largest world producer of silver; 4th largest world producer of boron; 5th largest world producer of antimony; 5th largest world producer of tin; 6th largest world producer of tungsten; 7th largest producer of zinc, and the 8th largest producer of lead.

In 2019, Argentina was the 4th largest world producer of lithium, the 9th largest world producer of silver, the 17th largest world producer of gold and the 7th largest world producer of boron.

Colombia is the world's largest producer of emeralds. In the production of gold, between 2006 and 2017, the country produced 15 tonnes (15 long tons; 17 short tons) per year until 2007, when its production increased significantly, breaking a record of 66.1 tonnes (65.1 long tons; 72.9 short tons) extracted in 2012. In 2017, it extracted 52.2 tonnes (51.4 long tons; 57.5 short tons). The country is among the 25 largest gold producers in the world. In the production of silver, in 2017 the country extracted 15.5 tonnes (15.3 long tons; 17.1 short tons).

In the production of oil, Brazil was the 10th largest oil producer in the world in 2019, with 2.8 million barrels/day. Venezuela was the 21st largest, with 877 thousand barrels/day, and Colombia was 22nd with 886 thousand. As Venezuela and Ecuador consume little oil and export most of their production, they are part of OPEC. Venezuela had a big drop in production after 2015 (when it produced 2.5 million barrels/day), falling in 2018 to 1.4 million and in 2019 to 877 thousand, due to lack of investment.

For natural gas, in 2018, Argentina produced 1524 bcf (billion cubic feet), Venezuela 946, Brazil 877, Bolivia 617, Peru 451, Colombia 379.

At the beginning of 2020, in the production of oil and natural gas, Brazil exceeded 4 million barrels of oil equivalent per day for the first time. In January 2021, 3.168 million barrels of oil per day and 139 million cubic meters of natural gas were extracted. The continent had 2 of the 30 largest world producers of coal in 2018: Colombia (12th) and Brazil (27th).

=== Tourism ===
Tourism has increasingly become a significant source of income for South American countries.

Historic relics, architectural and natural wonders, a range of foods and culture, cities, and landscapes attract millions of tourists every year to South America. Some of the most visited places in the region are Rio de Janeiro, Florianópolis, Iguazu Falls, São Paulo, Armação dos Búzios, Salvador, Bombinhas, Angra dos Reis, Balneário Camboriú, Paraty, Ipojuca, Natal, Cairu, Fortaleza and Itapema in Brazil; Buenos Aires, Bariloche, Salta, Jujuy, Perito Moreno Glacier, Valdes Peninsula, Guarani Jesuit Missions in the cities of Misiones and Corrientes, Ischigualasto Provincial Park, Ushuaia and Patagonia in Argentina; Isla Margarita, Angel Falls, Los Roques archipelago, Gran Sabana in Venezuela; Machu Picchu, Lima, Nazca Lines, Cuzco in Peru; Lake Titicaca, Salar de Uyuni, La Paz, Jesuit Missions of Chiquitos in Bolivia; Tayrona National Natural Park, Santa Marta, Bogotá, Cali, Medellín, Cartagena in Colombia, and the Galápagos Islands in Ecuador. In 2016, Brazil hosted the 2016 Summer Olympics.

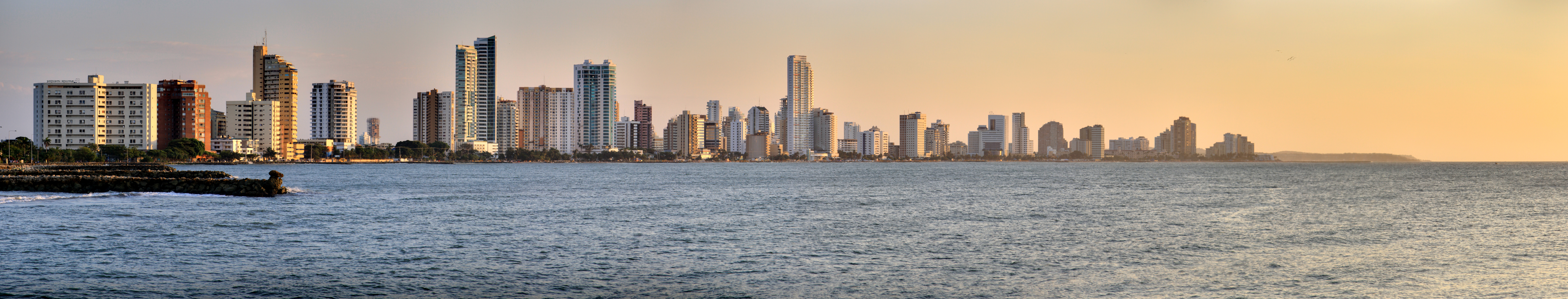
Panorama of Cartagena (2008), a major port on the northern coast of Colombia and one of the country's main tourist destinations

=== Energy ===
Due to the diversity of topography and pluviometric precipitation conditions, the region's water resources vary enormously in different areas. In the Andes, navigation possibilities are limited, except for the Magdalena River, Lake Titicaca, and the lakes of the southern regions of Chile and Argentina. Irrigation is an important factor for agriculture from northwestern Peru to Patagonia. Less than 10% of the known electrical potential of the Andes had been used until the mid-1960s.

The Brazilian Highlands have a much higher hydroelectric potential than the Andean region, and their possibilities for exploitation are greater due to the existence of several large rivers with high margins and the occurrence of great differences forming huge cataracts, such as those of Paulo Afonso, Iguaçu, and others. The Amazon River system has about 13,000 km (8,100 mi) of waterways, but its possibilities for hydroelectric power use are still unknown.

Most of the continent's energy is generated through hydroelectric power plants, but there is also an important share of thermoelectric and wind energy. Brazil and Argentina are the only South American countries that generate nuclear power, each with two nuclear power plants. In 1991, these countries signed a peaceful nuclear cooperation agreement.

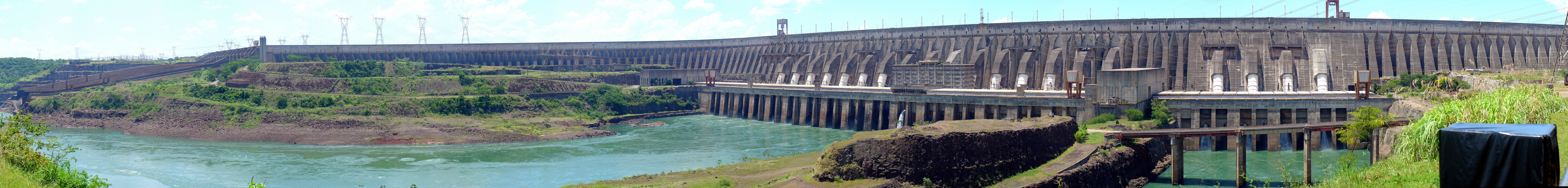
Panoramic view of the Itaipu Dam, the second-largest in the world in energy production

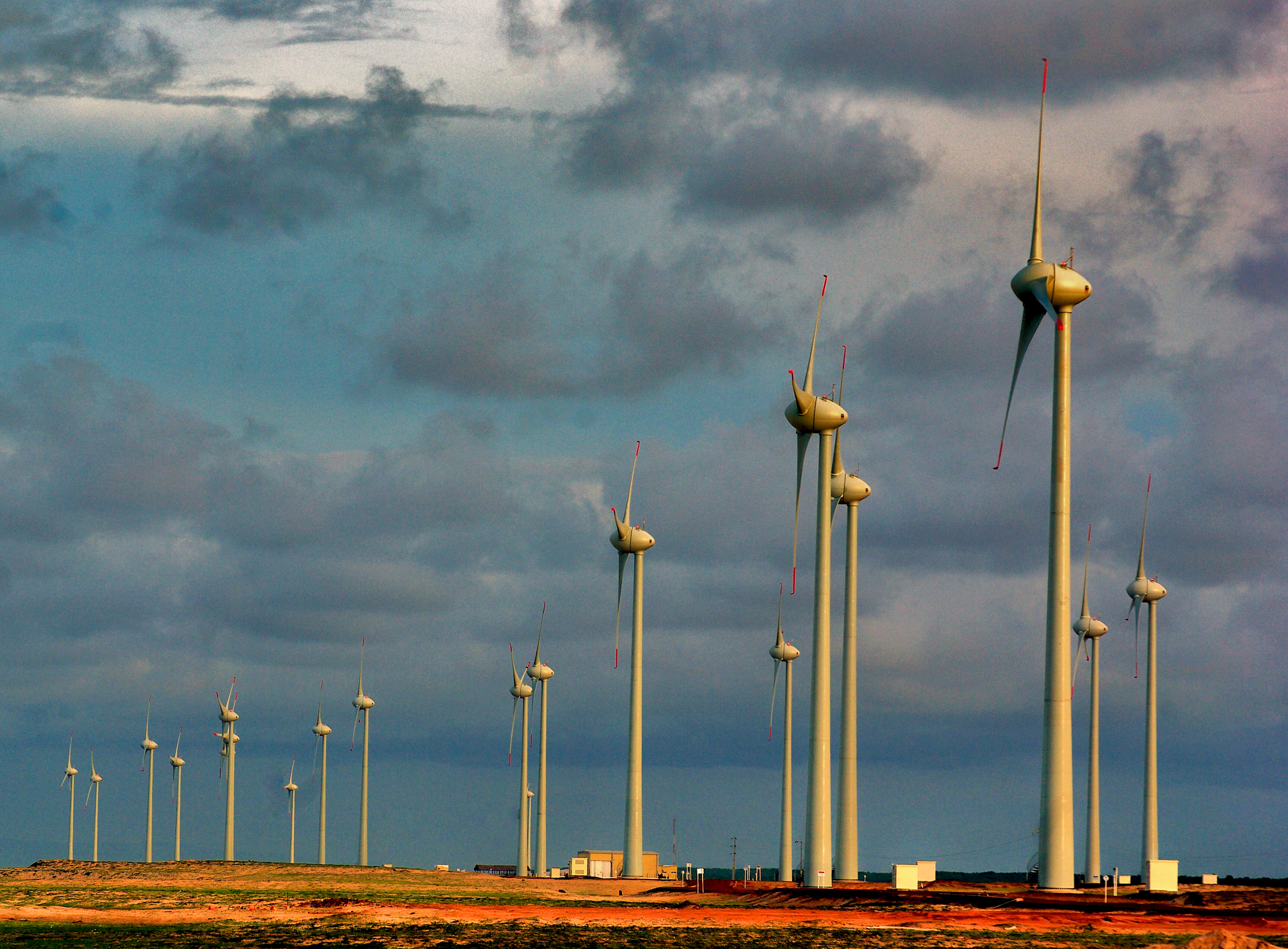
Wind power in Parnaíba

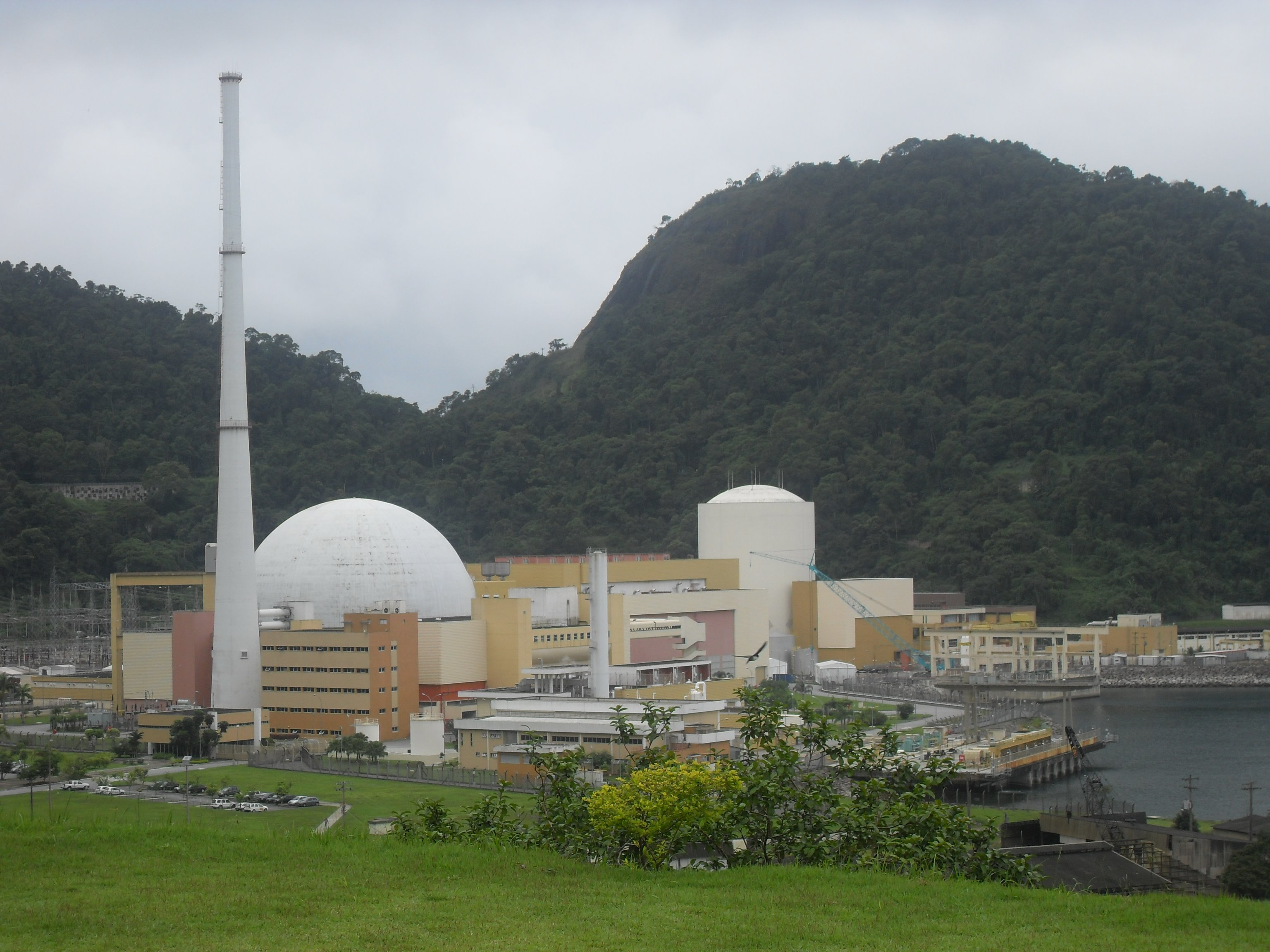
Angra Nuclear Power Plant in Angra dos Reis, Rio de Janeiro

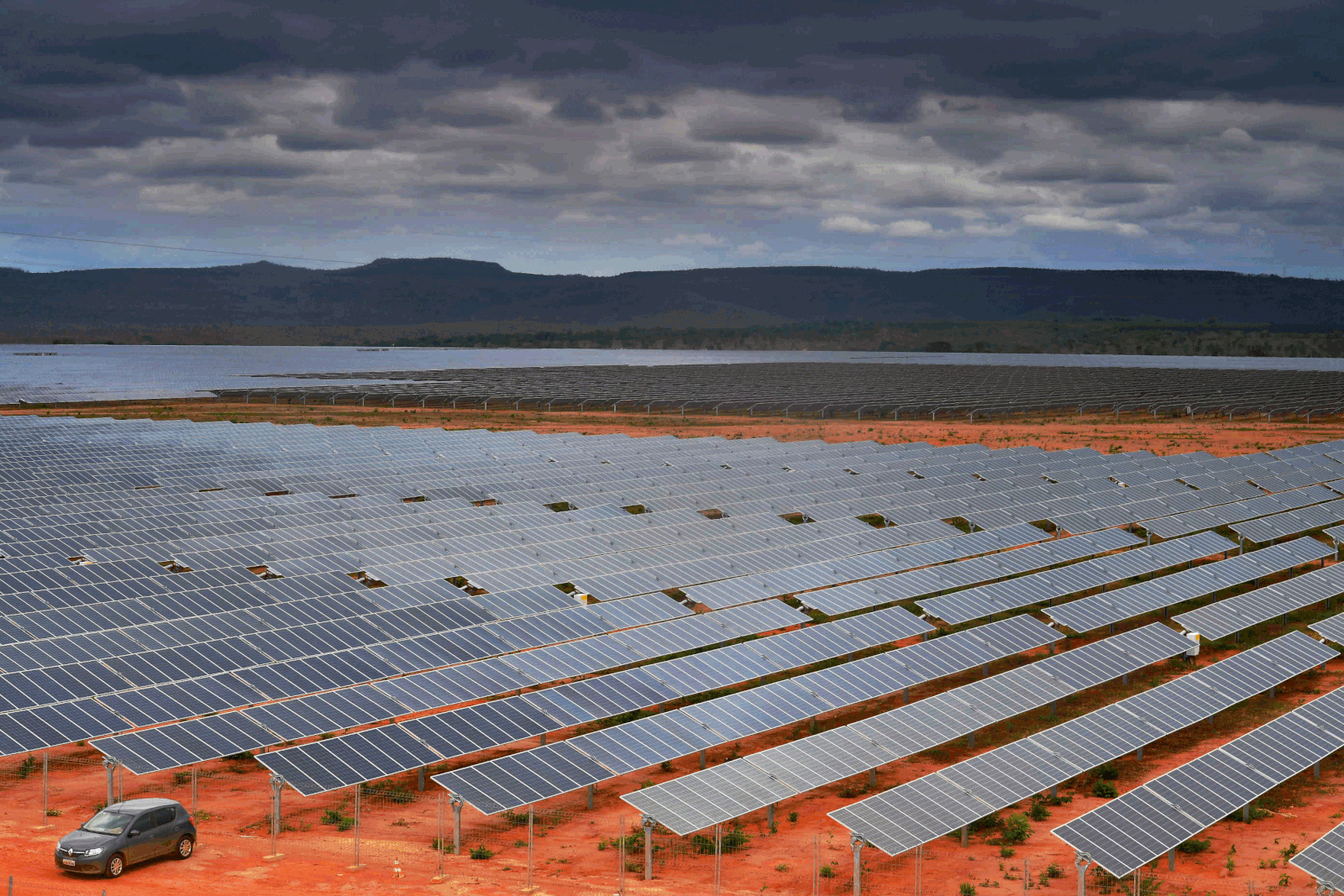
Pirapora Solar Complex, the largest in Brazil and Latin America with a capacity of 321 MW

The Brazilian government has undertaken an ambitious program to reduce dependence on imported petroleum. Imports previously accounted for more than 70% of the country's oil needs, but Brazil became self-sufficient in oil in 2006–2007. Brazil was the 10th largest oil producer in the world in 2019, with 2.8 million barrels/day. Production managed to meet the country's demand. At the beginning of 2020, in the production of oil and natural gas, the country exceeded 4 million barrels of oil equivalent per day for the first time. In January this year, 3.168 million barrels of oil per day and 138.753 million cubic meters of natural gas were extracted.

Brazil is one of the main world producers of hydroelectric power. In 2019, Brazil had 217 hydroelectric plants in operation, with an installed capacity of 98,581 MW, which constitutes 60.16% of the country's energy generation. In 2019, Brazil reached a total of 170,000 megawatts of installed power generation capacity, of which more than 75% are from renewable sources (the majority, hydroelectric).

In 2013, the Southeast Region used about 50% of the load of the National Integrated System (SIN), being the main energy-consuming region in the country. The region's installed electricity generation capacity totaled almost 42,500 MW, which represented about a third of Brazil's generation capacity. Hydroelectric generation represented 58% of the region's installed capacity, with the remaining 42% coming mostly from thermoelectric generation. São Paulo accounted for 40% of this capacity; Minas Gerais for about 25%; Rio de Janeiro for 13.3%; and Espírito Santo accounted for the rest. The South Region owns the Itaipu Dam, which was the largest hydroelectric plant in the world for several years, until the inauguration of the Three Gorges Dam in China. It remains the second-largest operating hydroelectric power generation capacity in the world. Brazil is the co-owner of the Itaipu Plant with Paraguay: the dam is located on the Paraná River, on the border between the two countries. It has an installed generation capacity of 14 GW for 20 generating units of 700 MW each. North Region has large hydroelectric plants, such as Belo Monte Dam and Tucuruí Dam, which produce much of the national energy. Brazil's hydroelectric potential has not yet been fully exploited, so the country still has the capacity to build several renewable energy plants in its territory.

As of July 2022, according to ONS, the total installed capacity of wind power was 22 GW, with an average capacity factor of 58%. While the world average wind production capacity factor is 24.7%, there are areas in Northern Brazil, especially in Bahia State, where some wind farms record average capacity factors of over 60%; the average capacity factor in the Northeast Region is 45% on the coast and 49% in the interior. In 2019, wind energy represented 9% of the energy generated in the country. In 2019, it was estimated that the country had a wind power generation potential of around 522 GW (this, only onshore), enough energy to meet three times the country's current demand. In 2021, Brazil ranked 7th in the world in terms of installed wind power capacity (21 GW), and the 4th largest producer of wind energy in the world (72 TWh), behind only China, the United States, and Germany.

Nuclear energy accounts for about 4% of Brazil's electricity. The nuclear power generation monopoly is owned by Eletronuclear (Eletrobrás Eletronuclear S/A), a wholly owned subsidiary of Eletrobrás. Nuclear energy is produced by two reactors at Angra. It is located at the Central Nuclear Almirante Álvaro Alberto (CNAAA) on the Praia de Itaorna in Angra dos Reis, Rio de Janeiro. It consists of two pressurized water reactors, Angra I, with a capacity of 657 MW, connected to the power grid in 1982, and Angra II, with a capacity of 1,350 MW, connected in 2000. A third reactor, Angra III, with a projected output of 1,350 MW, is planned to be completed.

As of October 2022, according to ONS, the total installed capacity of photovoltaic solar was 21 GW, with an average capacity factor of 23%. Some of the most irradiated Brazilian States are MG ("Minas Gerais"), BA ("Bahia"), and GO (Goiás), which have world irradiation records. In 2019, solar power represented 1.27% of the energy generated in the country. In 2021, Brazil was the 14th country in the world in terms of installed solar power (13 GW), and the 11th largest producer of solar energy in the world (16.8 TWh).

In 2020, Brazil was the 2nd largest country in the world in the production of energy through biomass (energy production from solid biofuels and renewable waste), with 15,2 GW installed.

After Brazil, Colombia is the country in South America that stands out most in energy production. In 2020, the country was the 20th largest petroleum producer in the world, and in 2015 it was the 19th largest exporter. In natural gas, the country was, in 2015, the 40th largest producer in the world. Colombia's biggest highlight is in coal, where the country was, in 2018, the world's 12th largest producer and the 5th largest exporter. In renewable energies, in 2020, the country ranked 45th in the world in terms of installed wind energy (0.5 GW), 76th in the world in terms of installed solar energy (0.1 GW), and 20th in the world in terms of installed hydroelectric power (12.6 GW).

Venezuela, which was one of the world's largest oil producers (about 2.5 million barrels/day in 2015) and one of the largest exporters, due to its political problems, has had its production drastically reduced in recent years: in 2016, it dropped to 2.2 million, in 2017 to 2 million, in 2018 to 1.4 million and in 2019 to 877 thousand, reaching only 300,000 barrels/day at a given point. The country also stands out in hydroelectricity, where it was the 14th country in the world in terms of installed capacity in 2020 (16,5 GW).

Argentina was in 2017 the 18th largest producer of natural gas in the world, and the largest producer of natural gas in Latin America, in addition to being the 28th largest oil producer; although the country has the Vaca Muerta field, which holds close to 16 billion barrels of technically recoverable shale oil, which is the second largest natural shale gas deposit in the world, the country lacks the capacity to exploit the deposit: it lacks the necessary capital, technology and knowledge that can only come from offshore energy companies, who view Argentina and its erratic economic policies with considerable suspicion, not wanting to invest in the country. In renewable energies, in 2020, the country ranked 27th in the world in terms of installed wind energy (2.6 GW), 42nd in the world in terms of installed solar energy (0.7 GW) and 21st in the world in terms of installed hydroelectric power (11.3 GW). The country has great potential for the production of wind energy in the Patagonia region.

Chile, although currently not a major energy producer, has great future potential for solar energy production in the Atacama Desert region. Paraguay stands out today in hydroelectric production thanks to the Itaipu Power Plant. Bolivia stands out in the production of natural gas, where it was the 31st largest in the world in 2015. Ecuador, because it consumes little energy, is part of OPEC and was the 27th largest oil producer in the world in 2020, being the 22nd largest exporter in 2014.

=== Transport ===
Transport infrastructure in South America includes roads, railways, seaports and airports. The railway and fluvial sector, although having more robust contemporary potential, are still somewhat treated in a secondary way.

==== Roads ====
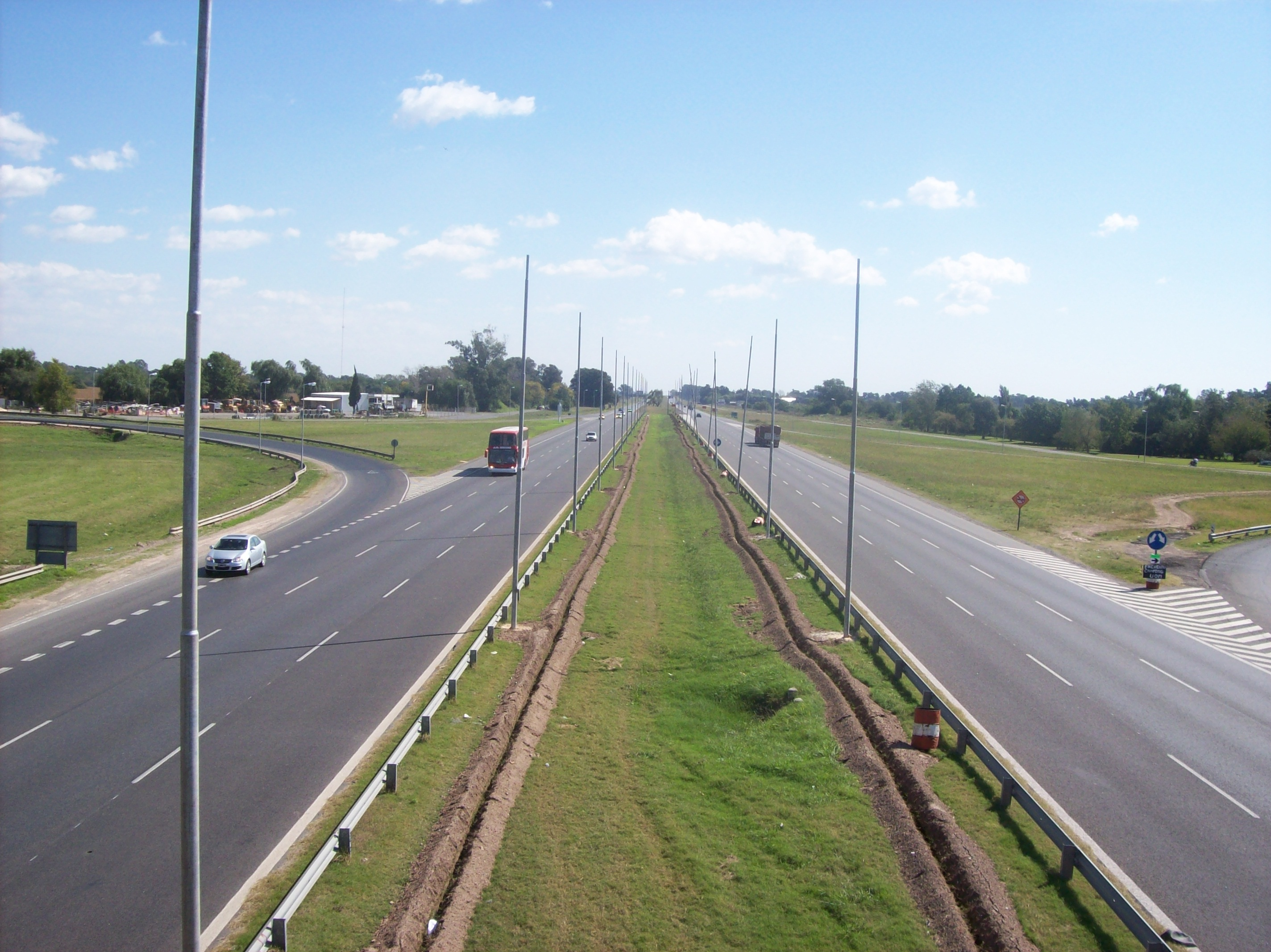
Ruta 9 / 14, in Zarate, Argentina

Due to the Andes Mountains, Amazon River, and Amazon Forest, there have always been difficulties in implementing larger-scale transcontinental or bi-oceanic highways. Practically, the only route that existed was the one that connected Brazil to Buenos Aires (in Argentina) and later to Santiago (in Chile). However, in recent years, with the combined effort of countries, new routes have started to emerge, such as Brazil-Peru (Interoceanic Highway), and a new highway between Brazil, Paraguay, northern Argentina and northern Chile (Bioceanic Corridor).

Some of the most modern roads extend through northern and south-east Argentina; and south of Brazil, a vast road complex aims to link Brasília, the federal capital, to the South, Southeast, Northeast and Northern regions of Brazil.

Brazil has more than 1.7 million kilometres (1.1 million miles) of roads, of which 215,000 km (134,000 mi) are paved, and about 14,000 km (8,700 mi) are divided highways. The two most important highways in the country are BR-101 and BR-116. Argentina has more than 600,000 km (370,000 mi) of roads, of which about 70,000 km (43,000 mi) are paved, and about 2,500 km (1,600 mi) are divided highways. The three most important highways in the country are Route 9, Route 7, and Route 14. Colombia has about 210,000 km (130,000 mi) of roads, and about 2,300 km (1,400 mi) are divided highways. Chile has about 82,000 km (51,000 mi) of roads, 20,000 km (12,000 mi) of which are paved, and about 2,000 km (1,200 mi) are divided highways. The most important highway in the country is Route 5 (Pan-American Highway). These 4 countries are the ones with the best road infrastructure and with the largest number of double-lane highways.

In addition, there is a reputed Pan-American Highway, which crosses Argentina and the Andean countries from north to south, although various stretches are unfinished.

==== Aviation ====
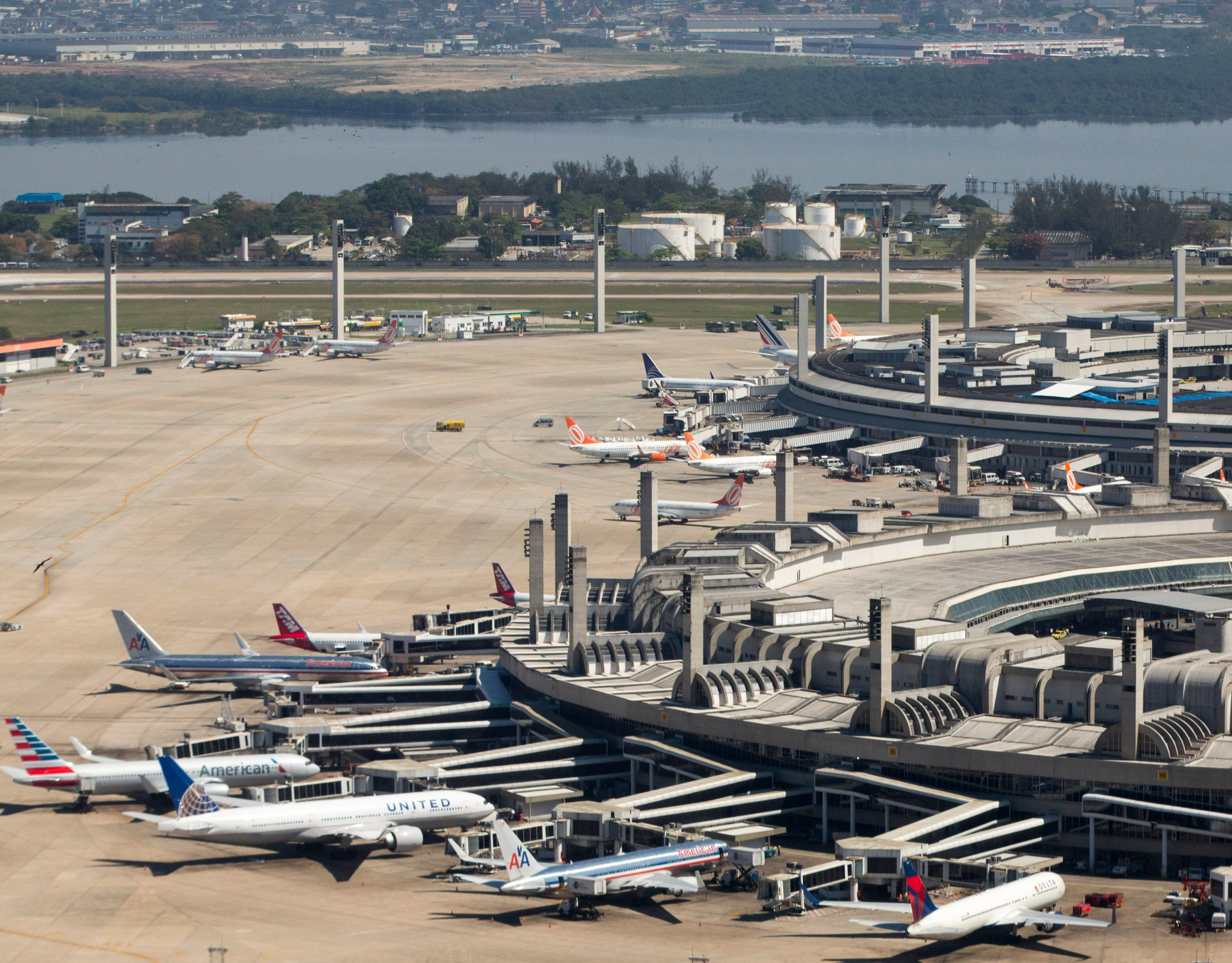
Rio de Janeiro International Airport

In South America, commercial aviation has expanded significantly with strong traffic density for the Rio de Janeiro–São Paulo route. Commercial aviation in South America is also anchored by major airports such as Congonhas, São Paulo–Guarulhos International and Viracopos (São Paulo), Rio de Janeiro International and Santos Dumont (Rio de Janeiro), El Dorado (Bogotá), Ezeiza (Buenos Aires), Tancredo Neves International Airport (Belo Horizonte), Curitiba International Airport (Curitiba), Brasília, Caracas, Montevideo, Lima, Viru Viru International Airport (Santa Cruz de la Sierra), Recife, Salvador, Salgado Filho International Airport (Porto Alegre), Fortaleza, Manaus and Belém.

There are more than 2,000 airports in Brazil. The country has the second largest number of airports in the world, behind only the United States. São Paulo International Airport, located in the Metropolitan Region of São Paulo, is the largest and busiest in the country – the airport connects São Paulo to practically all major cities around the world.

Brazil has 44 international airports, such as those in Rio de Janeiro, Brasília, Belo Horizonte, Porto Alegre, Florianópolis, Cuiabá, Salvador, Recife, Fortaleza, Belém and Manaus, among others.

Argentina has important international airports such as Buenos Aires, Córdoba, Bariloche, Mendoza, Salta, Puerto Iguazú, Neuquén and Ushuaia, among others.

Chile has international airports such as Santiago, Antofagasta, Puerto Montt, Punta Arenas and Iquique, among others.

Colombia has important international airports such as Bogotá, Medellín, Cartagena, Cali and Barranquilla, among others.

Other important airports are those in the capitals of Uruguay (Montevideo), Paraguay (Asunción), Peru (Lima), Bolivia (La Paz) and Ecuador (Quito). The 10 busiest airports in South America in 2017 were: São Paulo-Guarulhos (Brazil), Bogotá (Colombia), São Paulo-Congonhas (Brazil), Santiago (Chile), Lima (Peru), Brasília (Brazil), Rio de Janeiro (Brazil), Buenos Aires-Aeroparque (Argentina), Buenos Aires-Ezeiza (Argentina), and Minas Gerais (Brazil).

==== Seaports and harbors ====
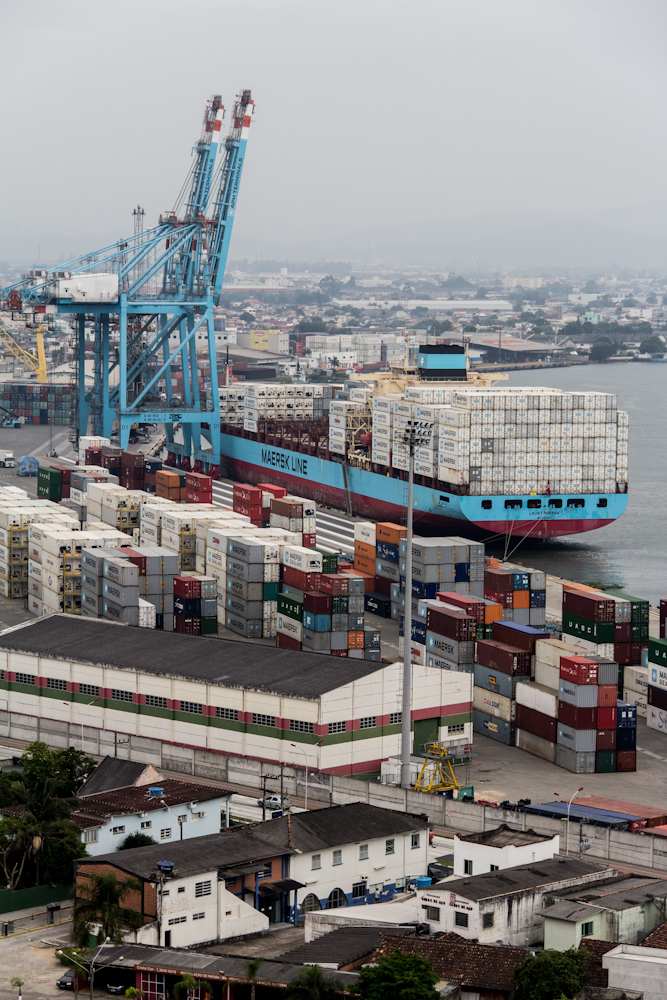
Port of Itajaí, Santa Catarina, Brazil

The two main merchant fleets also belong to Brazil and Argentina. The following are those of Chile, Venezuela, Peru, and Colombia. The largest ports in commercial movement are those of Buenos Aires, Santos, Rio de Janeiro, Bahía Blanca, Rosario, Valparaíso, Recife, Salvador, Montevideo, Paranaguá, Rio Grande, Fortaleza, Belém and Maracaibo.

Brazil has some of the busiest seaports in South America, such as Port of Santos, Port of Rio de Janeiro, Port of Paranaguá, Port of Itajaí, Port of Rio Grande, Port of São Francisco do Sul and Suape Port.

Argentina has ports such as the Port of Buenos Aires and the Port of Rosario.

Chile has important ports in Valparaíso, Caldera, Mejillones, Antofagasta, Iquique, Arica and Puerto Montt.

Colombia has important ports such as Buenaventura, Cartagena Container Terminal and Puerto Bolivar.

Peru has important ports in Callao, Chancay, Ilo, and Matarani.

The 15 busiest ports in South America are: Port of Santos (Brazil), Port of Bahia de Cartagena (Colombia), Callao (Peru), Guayaquil (Ecuador), Buenos Aires (Argentina), San Antonio (Chile), Buenaventura (Colombia), Itajaí (Brazil), Valparaíso (Chile), Montevideo (Uruguay), Paranaguá (Brazil), Rio Grande (Brazil), São Francisco do Sul (Brazil), Manaus (Brazil) and Coronel (Chile).

==== Rail ====
Two primary railroads are continental: the Transandina, which connects Buenos Aires, Argentina, to Valparaíso, Chile; and the Brazil–Bolivia Railroad, which connects the port of Santos, Brazil, and the city of Santa Cruz de la Sierra, Bolivia.

Two areas of greater density occur in the railway sector: the platinum network, which develops around the Platine region, largely belonging to Argentina, with more than 45,000 km (28,000 mi) in length; And the Southeast Brazil network, which mainly serves the states of São Paulo, Rio de Janeiro, and Minas Gerais.

The Argentine rail network, with 47,000 km (29,000 mi) of tracks, at one stage was one of the largest in the world and continues to be the most extensive in Latin America. It came to have about 100,000 km (62,000 mi) of rails, but the lifting of tracks and the emphasis placed on motor transport gradually reduced it. It has four different lines and international connections with Paraguay, Bolivia, Chile, Brazil, and Uruguay. The Brazilian railway network has an extension of about 30,000 kilometres (19,000 miles). It is basically used for transporting ores. Chile has almost 7,000 km (4,300 mi) of railways, with connections to Argentina, Bolivia and Peru. Colombia has about 3,500 km (2,200 mi) of railways.

==== Waterways ====
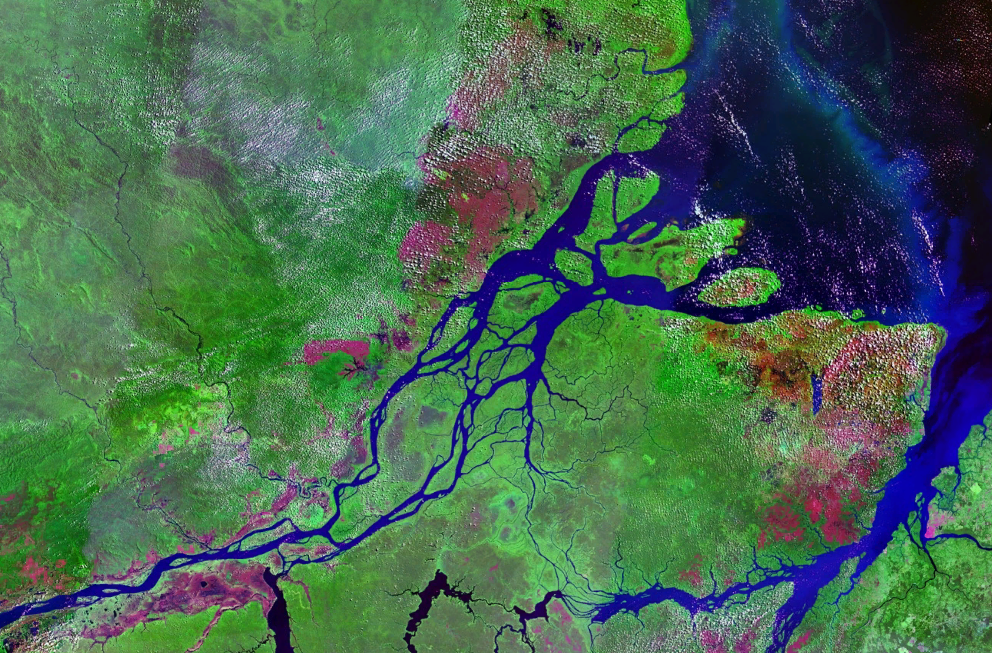
The mouth of the Amazon River

South America has one of the largest bays of navigable inland waterways in the world, represented mainly by the Amazon basin, the Platine basin, the São Francisco and the Orinoco basins, with Brazil having about 54,000 km (34,000 mi) navigable, while Argentina has 6,500 km (4,000 mi) and Venezuela has 1,200 km (750 mi).

Among the main Brazilian waterways, two stand out: the one is Hidrovia Tietê-Paraná—which has a length of 2,400 kilometres (1,500 miles), of which 1,600 kilometres (990 miles) are on the Paraná River and 800 kilometres (500 miles) are on the Tietê River—draining agricultural production from the states of Mato Grosso, Mato Grosso do Sul, Goiás and part of Rondônia, Tocantins and Minas Gerais; the second one is Hidrovia do Solimões-Amazonas with two sections: Solimões which extends from Tabatinga to Manaus with a length of approximately 1,600 kilometres (990 miles), and Amazonas which extends from Manaus to Belém with a length of approximately 1,650 kilometres (1,030 miles). Almost all passenger transport in the Amazon plain is done via this waterway, in addition to practically all cargo transportation that is directed to the major regional centers of Belém and Manaus.

In Brazil, water transport is still underutilized: the most important waterway stretches, from an economic point of view, are found in the Southeast and South of the country. Its full use still requires the construction of locks, major dredging works and the development of ports that allow intermodal integration.

In Argentina, the waterway network is made up of the La Plata, Paraná, Paraguay and Uruguay rivers. The main river ports are Zárate and Campana. The port of Buenos Aires is historically the first in individual importance, but the area known as Up-River, which stretches along 67 kilometres (42 miles) of the Santa Fé portion of the Paraná River, brings together 17 ports that concentrate around 50% of the total exports of the country.

==== Public transport ====
The primary public transport in major cities is the bus. Many cities have a diverse transport system of metro and subway trains, the first of which was the Buenos Aires subte, opened in 1913. The Santiago subway is the longest subway network in South America, spanning 103 kilometres (64 miles), while the São Paulo subway is the most heavily utilized, with more than 4.6 million passengers per day.

Rio de Janeiro installed the continent's first railroad in 1854. Today, the city has a diversified system of metropolitan trains, integrated with buses and subway. It has a Light Rail System called VLT, with small electric trams at low speed, while São Paulo has inaugurated a monorail. In Brazil, an express bus system called Bus Rapid Transit (BRT), which operates in several cities, has been developed. Mi Teleférico, also known as Teleférico La Paz–El Alto (La Paz–El Alto Cable Car), is an aerial cable car urban transit system serving the La Paz–El Alto metropolitan area in Bolivia.

== Demographics ==
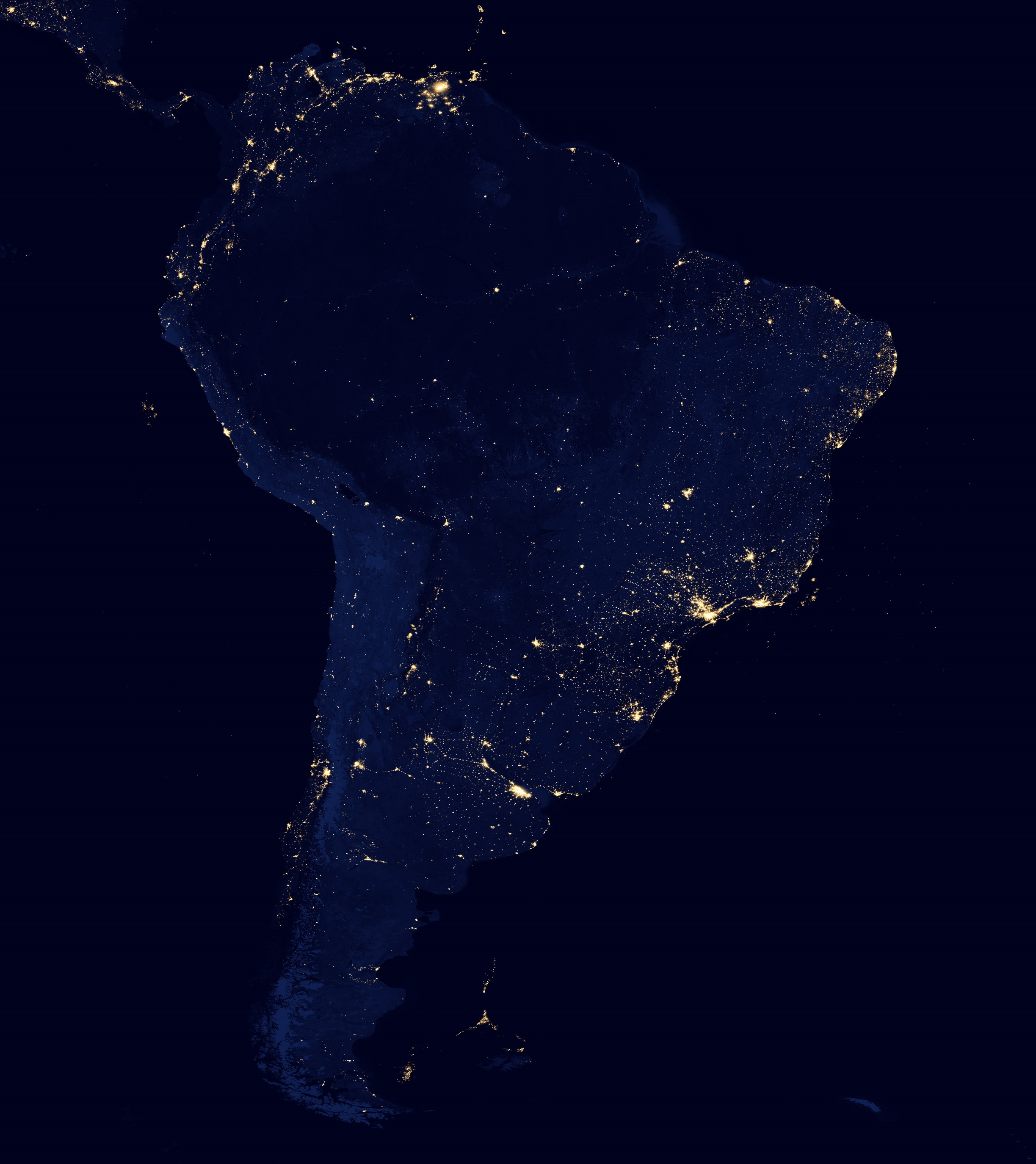
Satellite view of South America at night from NASA, showing the contrast between heavily populated coastal areas and the more remote regions of the Amazonian interior and Patagonia

South America has a population of over 428 million people. They are distributed so as to form a "hollow continent" with most of the population concentrated around the margins of the continent. On one hand, there are several sparsely populated areas such as tropical forests, the Atacama Desert, and the icy portions of Patagonia. On the other hand, the continent presents regions of high population density, such as the great urban centers. The population is formed by descendants of Europeans (mainly Spaniards, Portuguese and Italians), Africans and Amerindians. There is a high percentage of Mestizos that vary greatly in composition by place. There is a population of about 5 million Asians, mostly East Asians, especially in Brazil, Peru, and Argentina. The two main languages are by far Spanish and Portuguese, followed by English, French, and Dutch in smaller numbers.

=== Language ===
Official languages in South America

Spanish and Portuguese are the most spoken languages in South America, with approximately 200 million speakers each. Spanish is the official language of most countries, along with other native languages in some countries. Portuguese is the official language of Brazil. (Note: 95 municipalities and 3 Brazilian states have co-official languages, with 61 co-officialized languages. The list can be seen at Languages of Brazil.) Dutch is the official language of Suriname; English is the official language of Guyana, although there are at least twelve other languages spoken in the country, including Portuguese, Chinese, Hindustani and several native languages. English is also spoken in the Falkland Islands. French is the official language of French Guiana and the second language in Amapá, Brazil.

Indigenous languages of South America include Quechua in Peru, Bolivia, Ecuador, Chile, Argentina and Colombia; Wayuunaiki in northern Colombia (La Guajira) and northwestern Venezuela (Zulia); Guaraní in Paraguay and, to a much lesser extent, Bolivia; Aymara in Bolivia, Peru, and less often in Chile; and Mapudungun is spoken in certain pockets of southern Chile. At least three South American indigenous languages (Quechua, Aymara, and Guarani) are recognized along with Spanish as national languages.

Other languages found in South America include Sranan Tongo, Hindustani and Javanese in Suriname; Italian in Argentina, Brazil, Uruguay and Venezuela; and German in certain pockets of Argentina, Chile and Brazil. German is also spoken in many regions of the southern states of Brazil, Riograndenser Hunsrückisch being the most widely spoken German dialect in the country; among other Germanic dialects, a Brazilian form of East Pomeranian is also well represented and is experiencing a revival. Welsh remains spoken and written in the historic towns of Trelew and Rawson in the Argentine Patagonia; Croatian is spoken in southern Chile; and Arabic speakers—often of Lebanese, Syrian, or Palestinian descent—can be found in Arab communities in Argentina, Colombia, Brazil, Venezuela and in Paraguay.

=== Religion ===
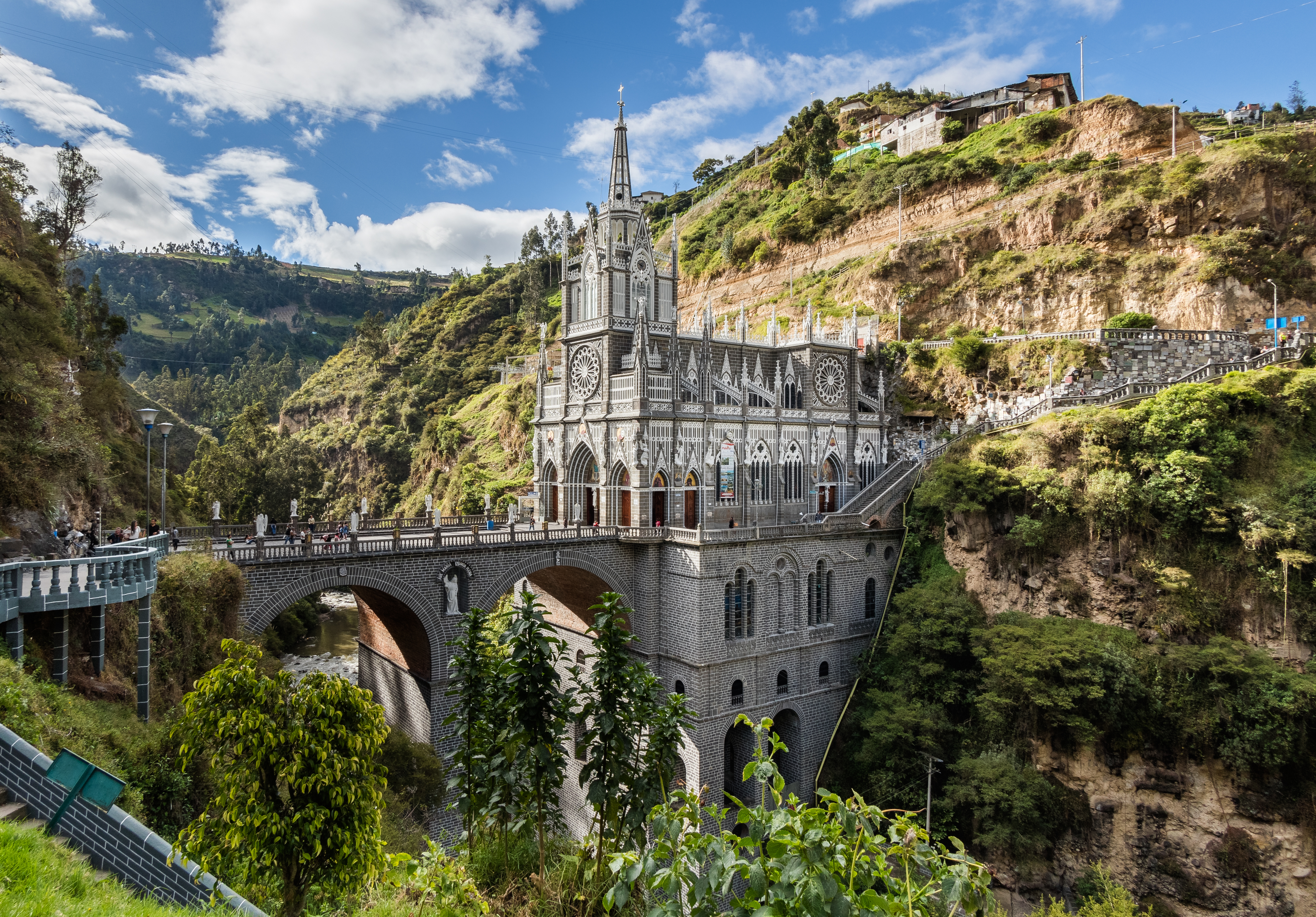
Las Lajas Sanctuary, Ipiales, Colombia

An estimated 90% of South Americans are Christians (82% Roman Catholic, 8% other Christian denominations, mainly traditional Protestants and Evangelicals, but also Orthodox), accounting for 19% of Christians worldwide.

African-descendant and Indigenous religions are common throughout South America; some examples are Santo Daime, Candomblé, and Umbanda. Crypto-Jews or Marranos, conversos, and Anusim were an important part of colonial life in Latin America. Buenos Aires and São Paulo figure among the largest Jewish populations by urban area.

East Asian religions such as Japanese Buddhism, Shintoism, and Shinto-derived Japanese New Religions are common in Brazil and Peru. Korean Confucianism is especially found in Brazil, while Chinese Buddhism and Chinese Confucianism have spread throughout the continent. Kardecist Spiritism can be found in several countries.

Hindus form 25% of the Guyanese population and 22% of Suriname's.

Muslims account for 7% of the Guyanese population and 14% of the Surinamese population.

Part of Religions in South America (2013):

Religion in South America
Countries	Christians	Roman Catholics	Other Christians	No religion (atheists and agnostics)
Argentina	88%	77%	11%	11%
Bolivia	96%	74%	22%	4%
Brazil	88%	64%	22%	8%
Chile	70%	57%	13%	25%
Colombia	92%	80%	12%	7%
Ecuador	93%	80%	13%	7%
Guyana	63%	7%	56%	3%
Paraguay	96%	87%	9%	2%
Peru	94%	81%	13%	3%
Suriname	51%	29%	22%	5%
Uruguay	58%	47%	11%	41%
Venezuela	88%	71%	17%	8%

=== Ethnic demographics ===
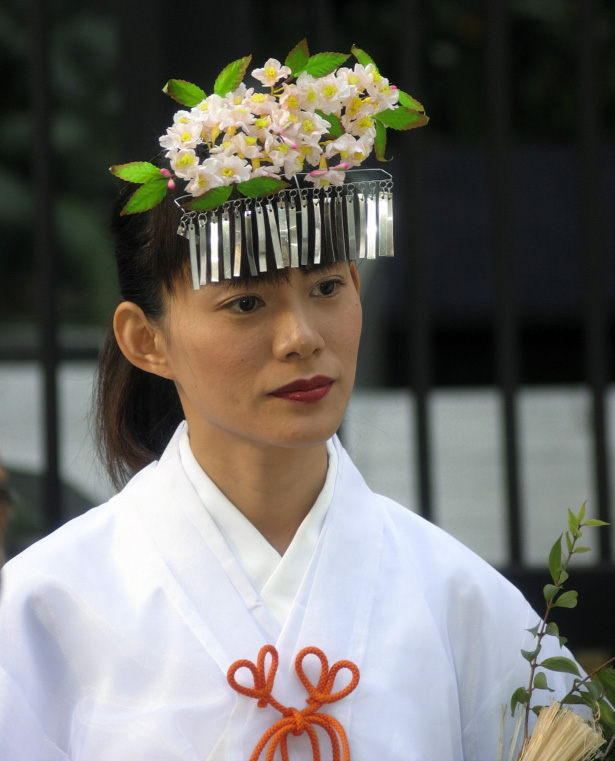
A Japanese-Brazilian Miko during a festival in Curitiba

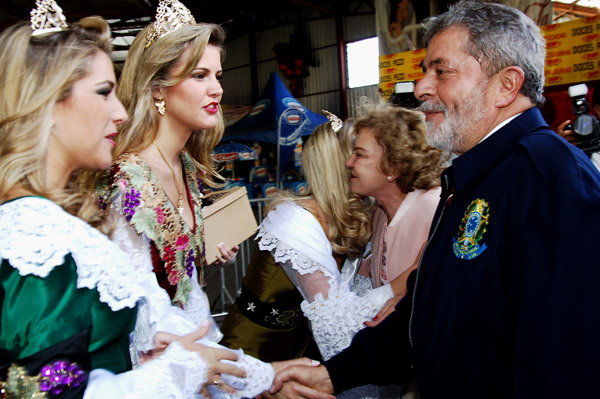
President of Brazil Lula and members of the Italian Brazilian community during the Grape Festival at Caxias do Sul

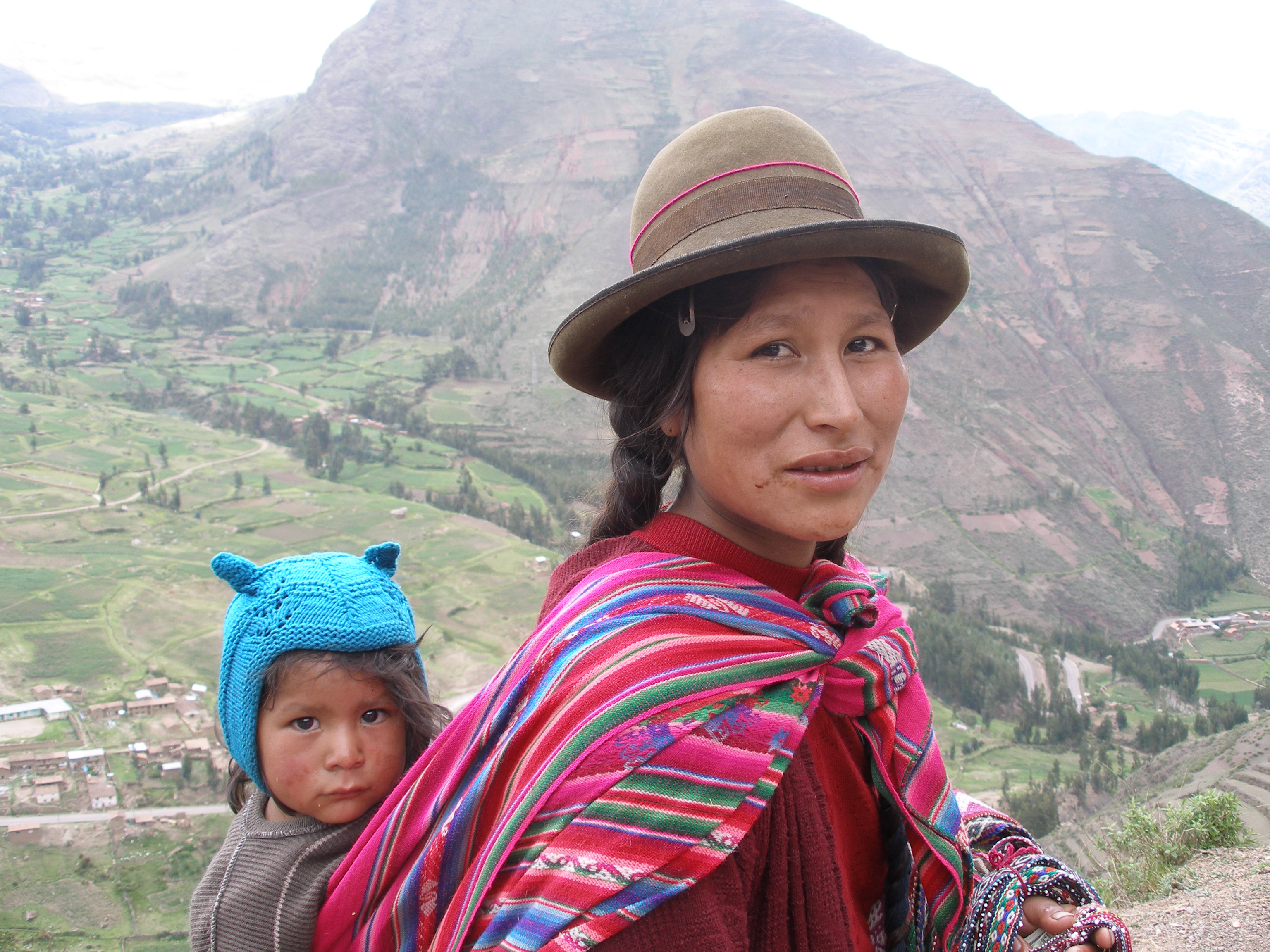
Peruvian woman and her son

Genetic admixture occurs at high levels in South America. In Argentina, European influence accounts for 65–80% of the genetic background, Amerindian (indigenous people) 17–31%, and sub-Saharan African 2–4%. In Colombia, the sub-Saharan African genetic background varied from 1% to 89%, while the European genetic background varied from 20 to 79%, depending on the region. In Peru, depending on the region, European ancestry can range from 10-20% (central) to 40-50% (north). The Genographic Project determined the average Peruvian from Lima had about 25% European ancestry, 68% Native American, 3% Southwest Asian ancestry, and 2% sub-Saharan African ancestry. According to genetic research in 2020, Peruvian genetic admixture indicates 63,7% Amerindian, 29,6% European, 4,8% African ancestry, and 2,9% Asian.

Descendants of indigenous peoples, such as the Quechua and Aymara, or the Urarina of Amazonia, make up the majority of the population in Bolivia (56%) and Peru (44%). In Ecuador, Amerindians comprise two-fifths of the population. The indigenous population is also a significant element in most other countries in South America.

People who identify as primarily or totally of European descent, or identify their phenotype as corresponding to such a group, are a majority in Uruguay and Argentina, as well as 43.5% of the population in Brazil. In Venezuela, according to the census, 42% of the population is of primarily Spanish, Italian, or Portuguese descent. In Colombia, people who identify as European descendants are about 20%. In Peru, European descendants are the third group in number (15%).

Mestizos (mixed European and Amerindian) are the largest ethnic group in Peru, Paraguay, Venezuela, Colombia and Ecuador and the second group in Bolivia, Chile and Argentina.

South America is home to one of the largest populations of Africans. This group is significantly present in Brazil, Colombia, Guyana, Suriname, French Guiana, Venezuela and Ecuador. Brazil, followed by Peru, has the largest Japanese, Korean and Chinese communities in South America. Lima has the largest ethnic Chinese community in Latin America. Guyana and Suriname have the largest ethnic East Indian community.

==== Indigenous people ====
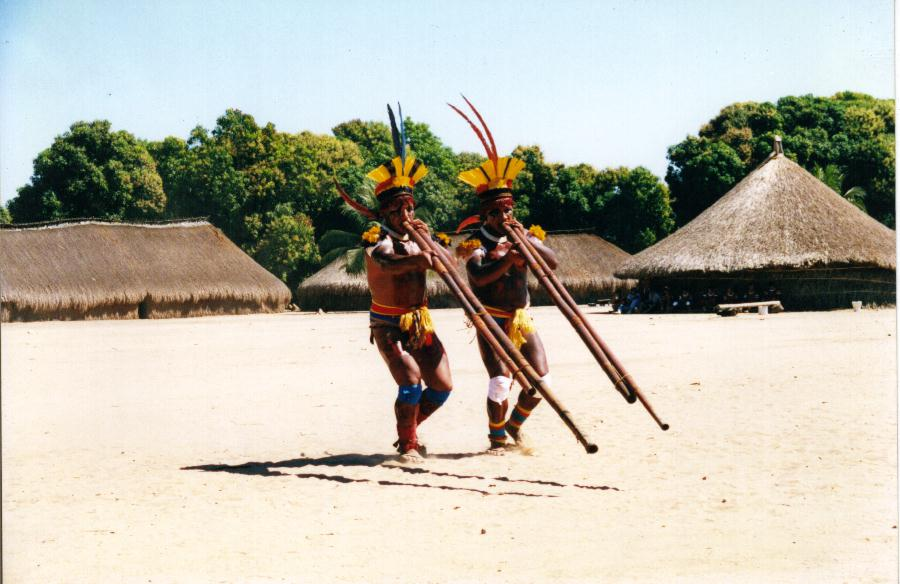
Xingu, an Indigenous territory of Brazil

In some places, indigenous people still practice a traditional lifestyle, based on subsistence agriculture or as hunter-gatherers. There are still uncontacted tribes residing in the Amazon Rainforest.

- Aguarunas
- Alacalufe
- Arawaks
- Ashanincas
- Atacameños
- Awá
- Aymara – live in the Altiplano of Bolivia, Chile, and Peru. Their language is co-official in Bolivia and Peru. Traditional lifestyle includes llama herding.
- Banawa
- Cañaris
- Caiapos
- Chibcha
- Cocama
- Chayahuita
- Diaguita
- Enxet
- Gê,
- Guaraní – live in Paraguay, where the Guarani language is co-official with Spanish. They are also found in Bolivia.
- Juris
- Guna live on the Colombia–Panama border.
- Mapuche – live mainly in southern Chile and southwestern Argentina (see Araucanian).
- Matsés
- Pehuenche – a branch of Mapuches that lived in the Andean valleys of southern (see Araucanian).
- Quechuas – make up a large part of the population of Peru and Bolivia. Are diverse as an ethnic group. The Incas spoke Southern Quechua.
- Selkʼnam
- Shipibo
- Shuar (see Jívaro).
- Tupi
- Urarina
- Wai-Wai
- Wayuu
- Xucuru
- Yaghan
- Yagua
- Yąnomamö
- Zaparos

=== Populace ===
While Brazil, Argentina, and Colombia maintain the largest populations, large city populations are not restricted to those nations. The top ten largest South American metropolitan areas by population as of 2015, based on national censuses:

Metro Area	Population	Area	Country
São Paulo	21,090,792	7,947 km^{2} (3,068 sq mi)	Brazil
Buenos Aires	13,693,657	3,830 km^{2} (1,480 sq mi)	Argentina
Rio de Janeiro	13,131,431	6,744 km^{2} (2,604 sq mi)	Brazil
Lima	9,904,727	2,819 km^{2} (1,088 sq mi)	Peru
Bogotá	9,800,225	4,200 km^{2} (1,600 sq mi)	Colombia
Santiago	6,683,852	15,403 km^{2} (5,947 sq mi)	Chile
Belo Horizonte	5,829,923	9,467 km^{2} (3,655 sq mi)	Brazil
Caracas	5,322,310	4,715 km^{2} (1,820 sq mi)	Venezuela
Porto Alegre	4,258,926	10,232 km^{2} (3,951 sq mi)	Brazil
Brasília	4,201,737	56,433 km^{2} (21,789 sq mi)	Brazil

Five of the top ten metropolitan areas are in Brazil. These metropolitan areas all have a population of above 4 million and include the São Paulo metropolitan area, Rio de Janeiro metropolitan area, and Belo Horizonte metropolitan area. Whilst the majority of the largest metropolitan areas are within Brazil, Argentina is host to the second largest metropolitan area by population in South America: the Buenos Aires metropolitan region, with a population in excess of 13 million.

South America has witnessed the growth of megapolitan areas. In Brazil, four megaregions exist, including the Expanded Metropolitan Complex of São Paulo with more than 32 million inhabitants. The others are the Greater Rio, Greater Belo Horizonte, and Greater Porto Alegre. Colombia also has four megaregions which comprise 72% of its population; the country is followed by Venezuela, Argentina, and Peru, which are also home to megaregions.

South American cities

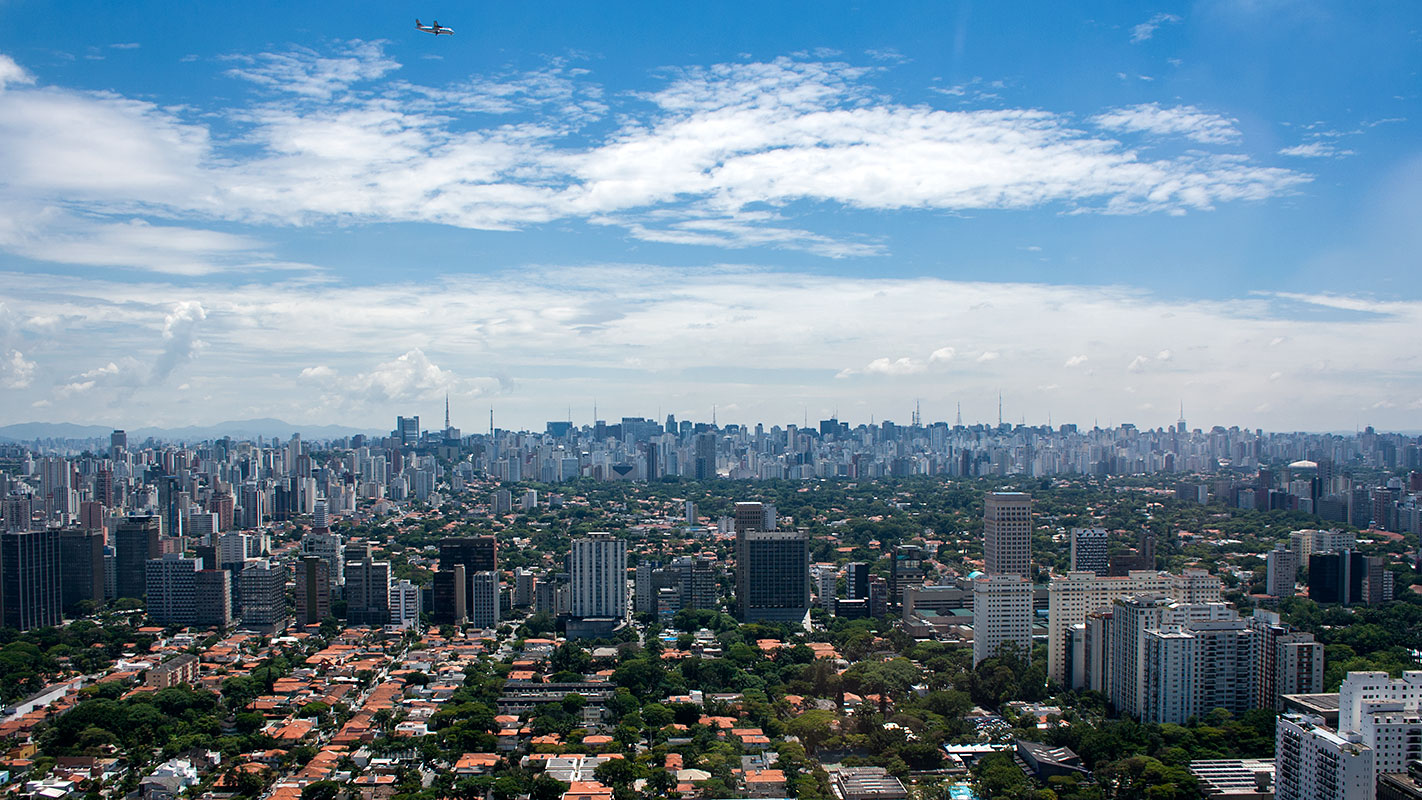
São Paulo

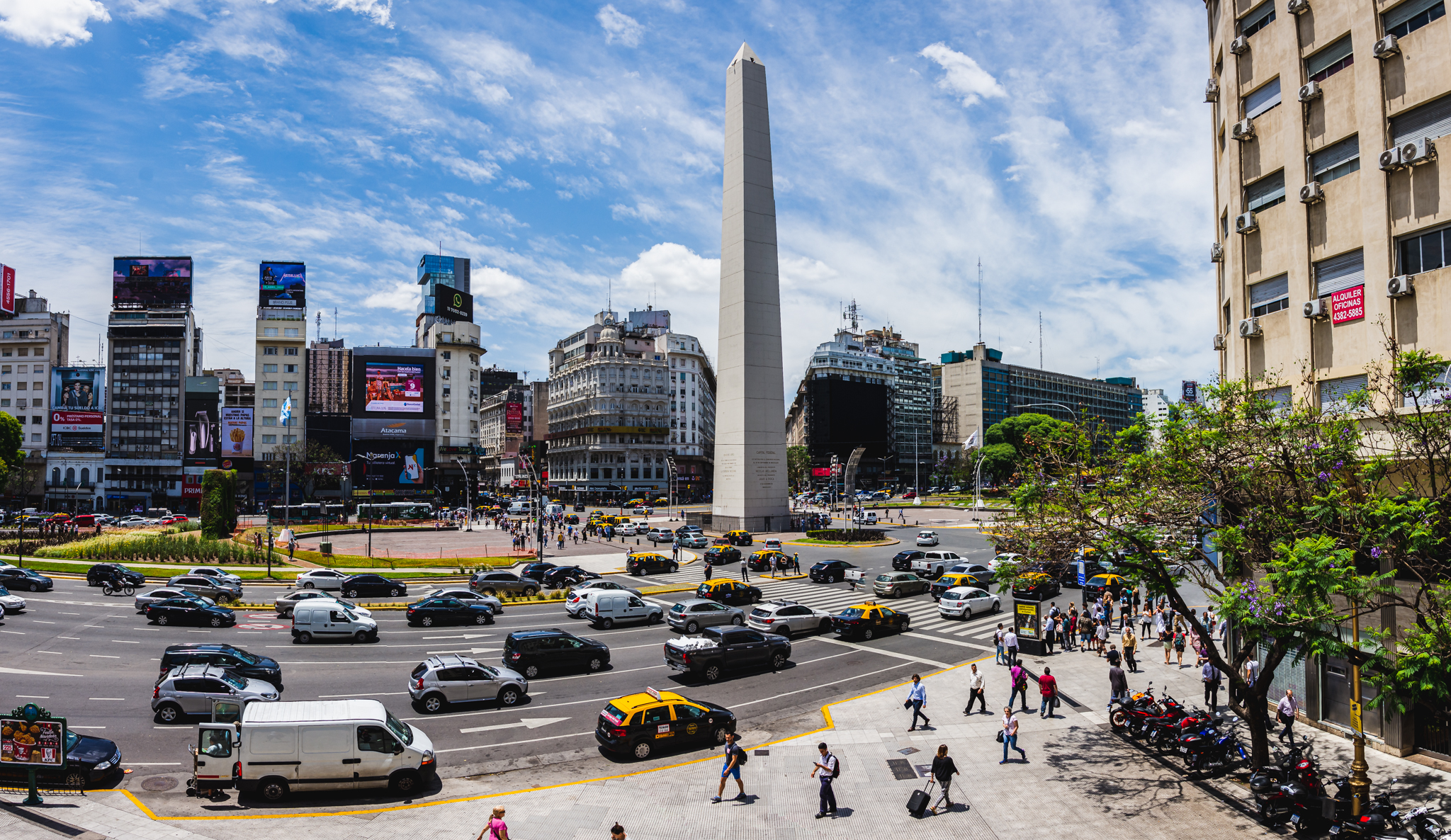
Buenos Aires

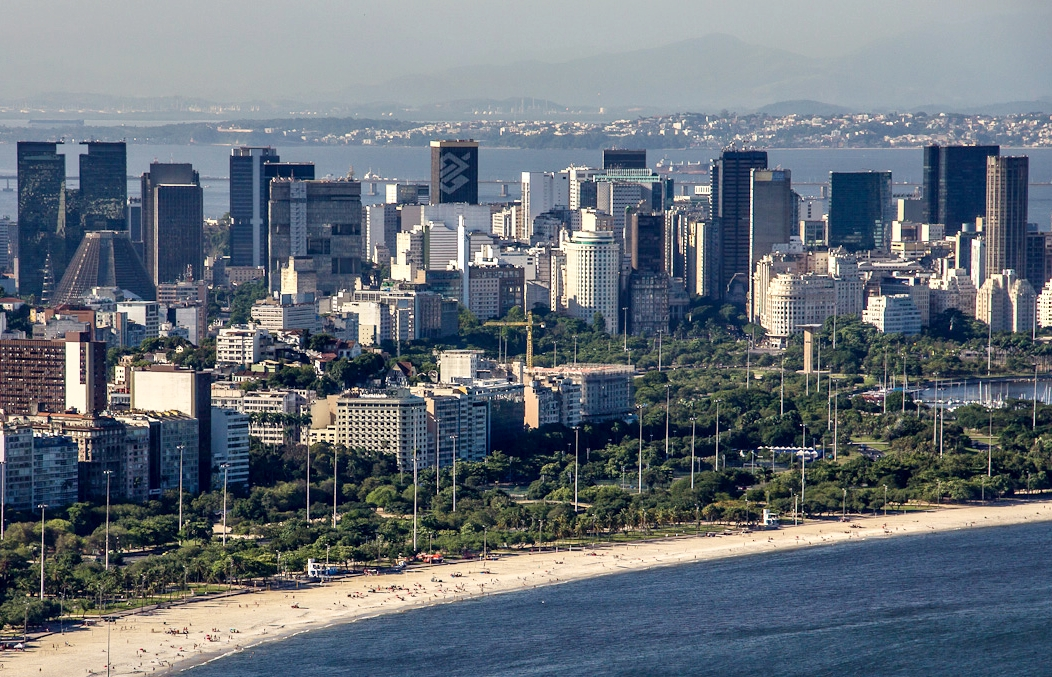
Rio de Janeiro

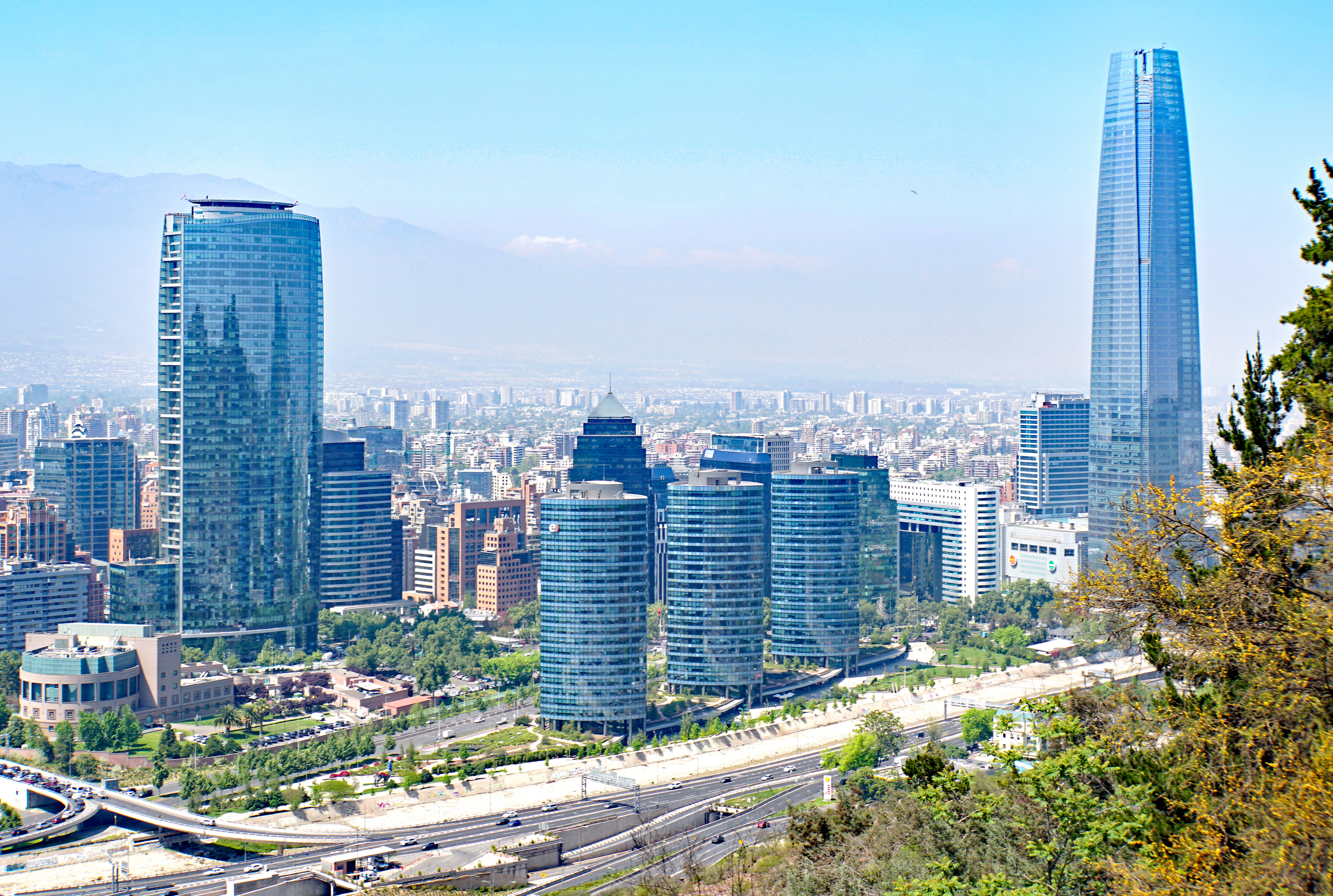
Santiago

== Culture ==
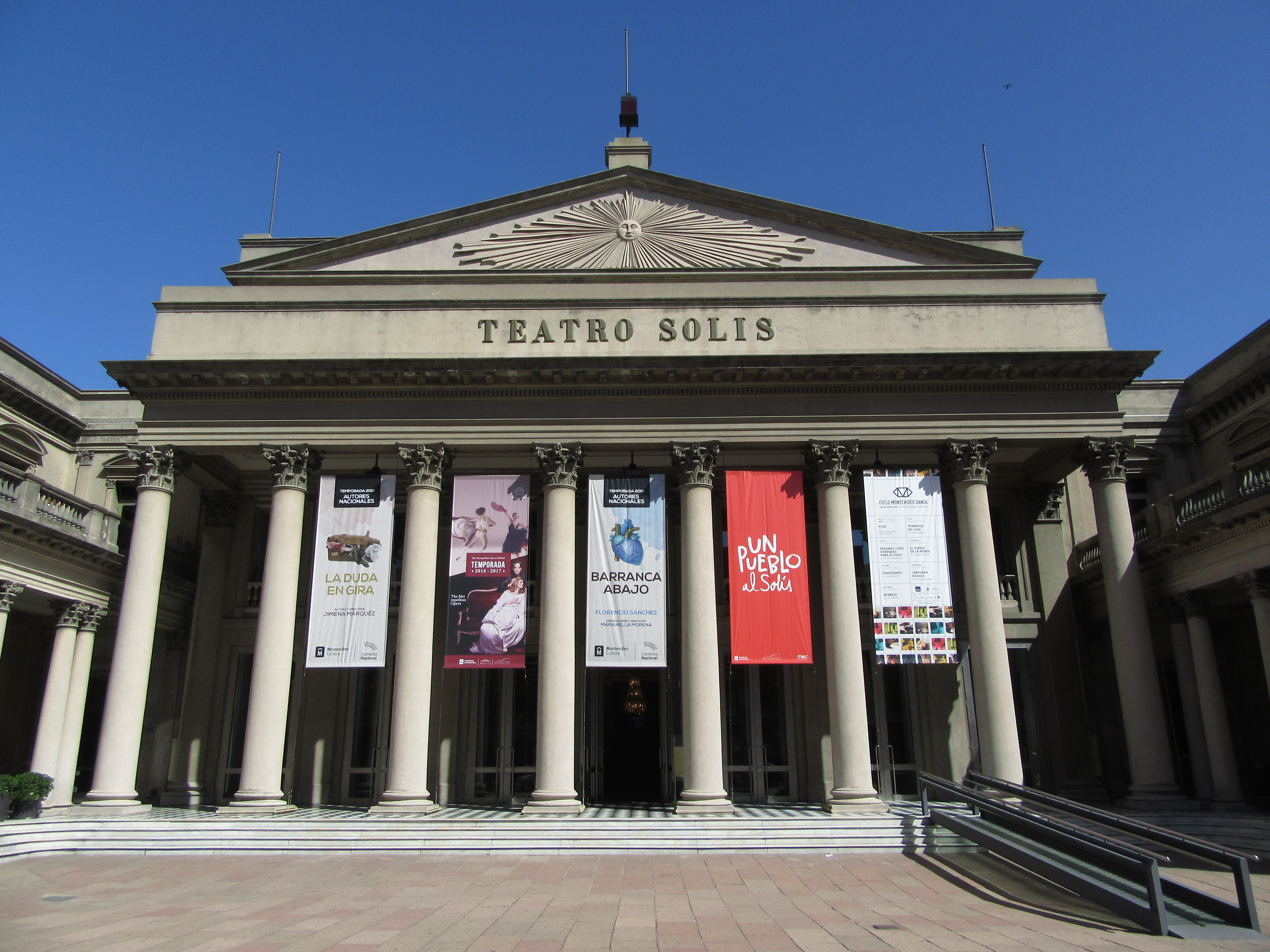
Teatro Solis, Uruguay

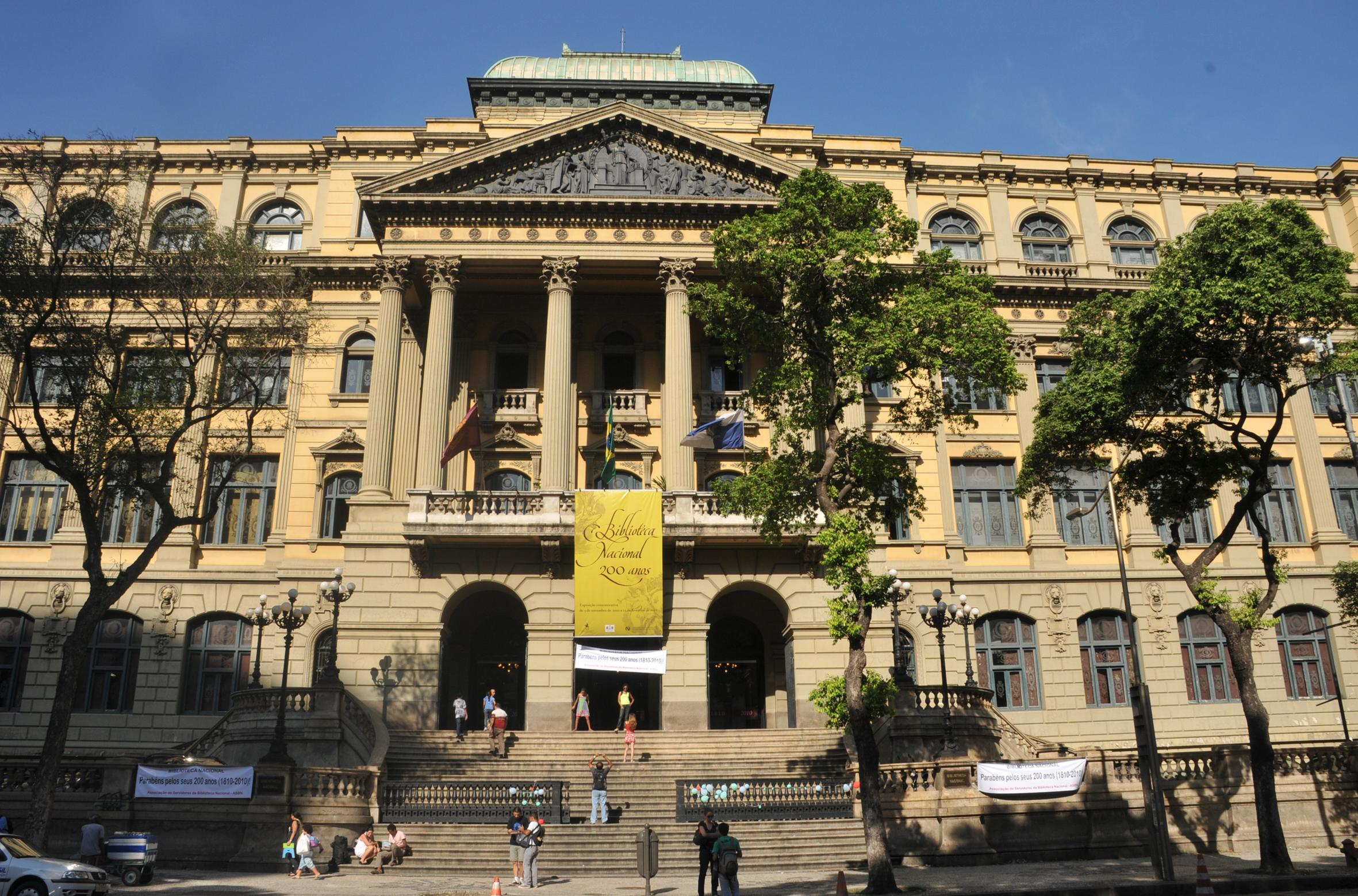
National Library, Brazil

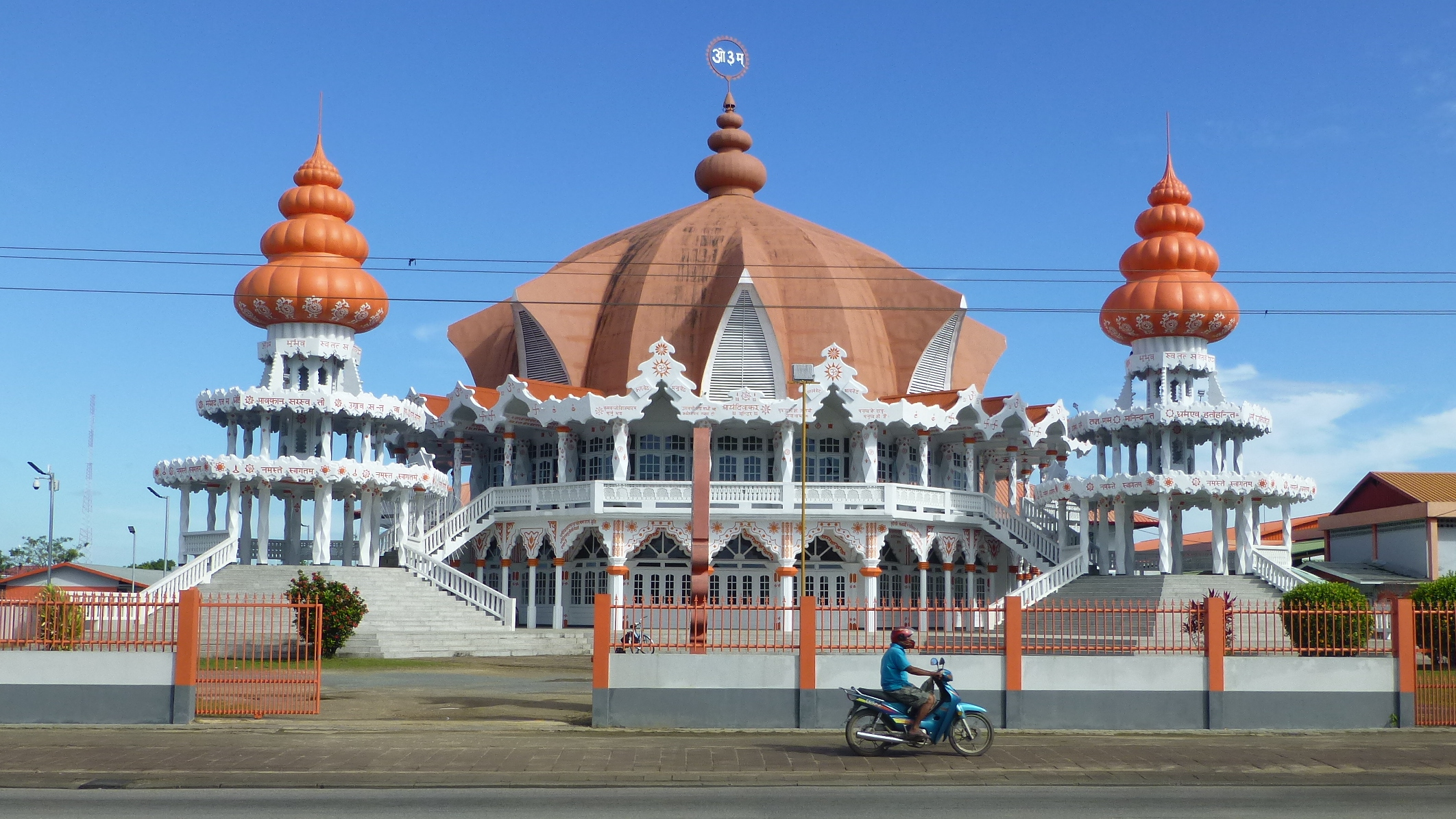
Arya Diwaker Hindu temple, Paramaribo, Suriname

South Americans are culturally influenced by their indigenous peoples, the historic connection with the Iberian Peninsula and Africa, and waves of immigrants from around the globe.

South American nations have a wide variety of music. Some of the most famous genres include vallenato and cumbia from Colombia, pasillo from Colombia and Ecuador, samba, bossa nova and música sertaneja from Brazil, joropo from Venezuela and tango from Argentina and Uruguay. Also well known is the non-commercial folk genre Nueva Canción movement, which was founded in Argentina and Chile and quickly spread to the rest of Latin America.

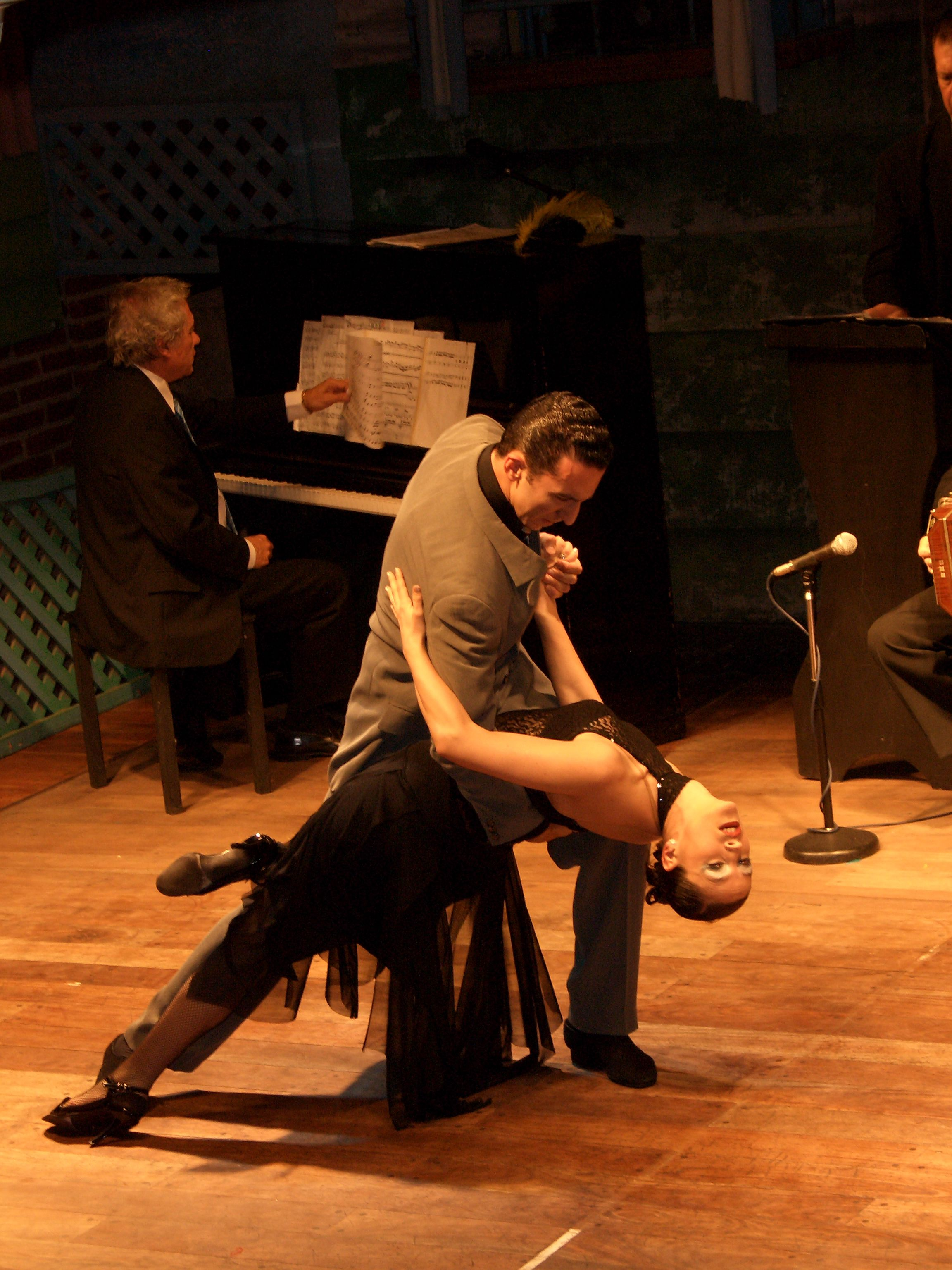
Tango show in Buenos Aires, typical Argentine dance

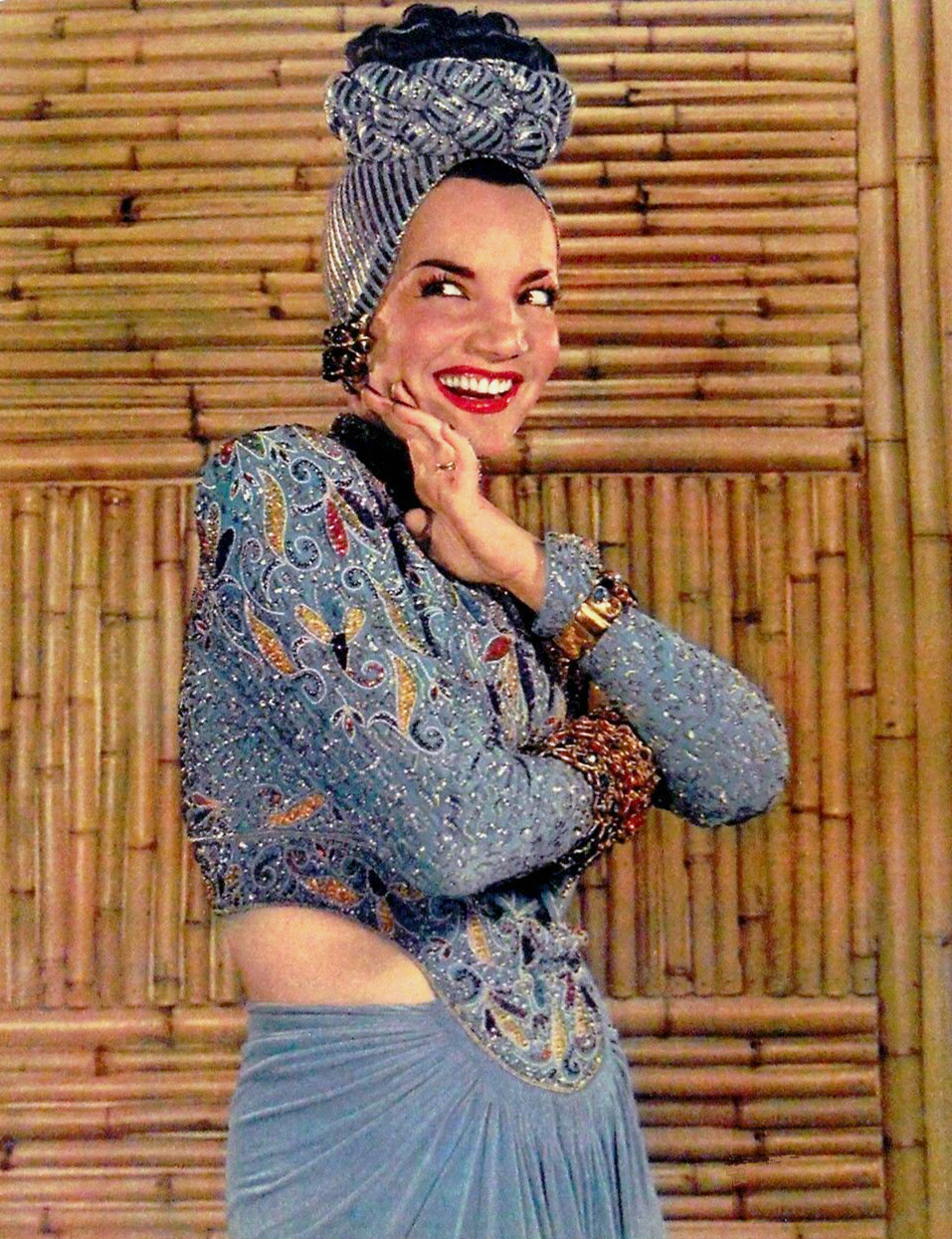
Carmen Miranda, a Portuguese Brazilian singer, helped popularize samba internationally.

People on the Peruvian coast created the fine guitar and cajon duos or trios in the most mestizo (mixed) of South American rhythms such as the Marinera (from Lima), the Tondero (from Piura), the 19th-century popular Creole Valse or Peruvian Valse, the soulful Arequipan Yaravi, and the early-20th-century Paraguayan Guarania. In the late 20th century, Spanish rock emerged through young hipsters influenced by British pop and American rock. Brazil has a Portuguese-language pop rock industry as well as a great variety of other music genres. In the central and western regions of Bolivia, Andean and folklore music like Diablada, Caporales, and Morenada are the most representative of the country, which originated from European, Aymara, and Quechua influences.

The literature of South America has attracted considerable critical and popular acclaim, especially with the Latin American Boom of the 1960s and 1970s, and the rise of authors such as Mario Vargas Llosa, Gabriel García Márquez in novels and Jorge Luis Borges and Pablo Neruda in other genres. The Brazilians Machado de Assis and João Guimarães Rosa are widely regarded as the greatest Brazilian writers.

=== Food and drink ===
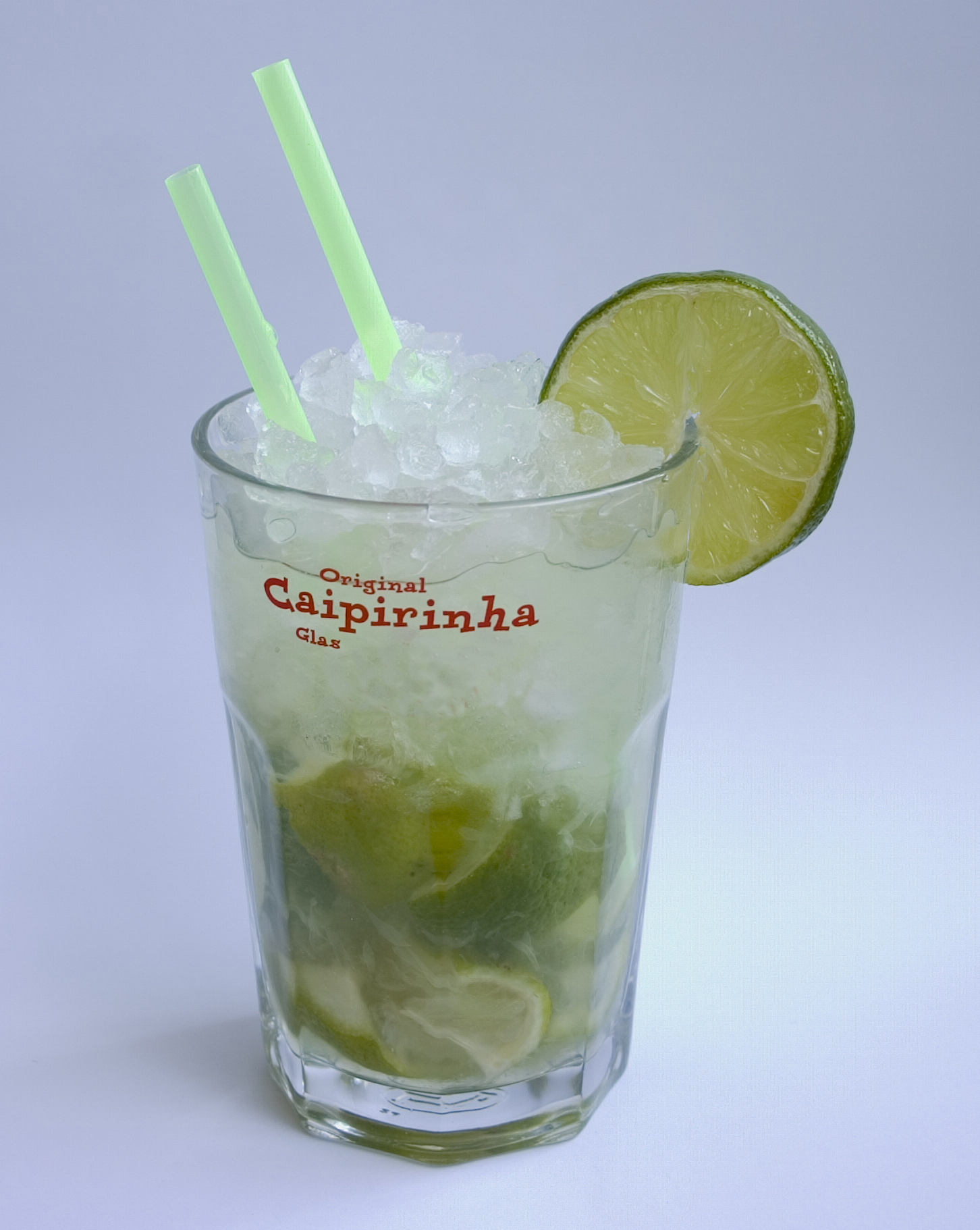
Caipirinha, a Brazilian cocktail, of São Paulo origin

Because of South America's broad ethnic mix, South American cuisine has African, Mestizo, South Asian, East Asian, and European influences. Bahia, Brazil, is especially well known for its West African–influenced cuisine, while São Paulo's cuisine is a mix of caipira and European cuisine, especially Italian. Argentines, Chileans, Uruguayans, Brazilians, Bolivians, and Venezuelans regularly consume wine. People in Argentina, Paraguay, Uruguay, southern Chile, Bolivia, and Southern Brazil drink mate, an herb that is brewed. The Paraguayan version, terere, differs from other forms of mate in that it is served cold. Pisco is a liquor distilled from grapes in Peru and Chile. Peruvian cuisine mixes elements from Chinese, Japanese, Spanish, Italian, African, Arab, Andean, and Amazonic food.

=== Plastic arts ===
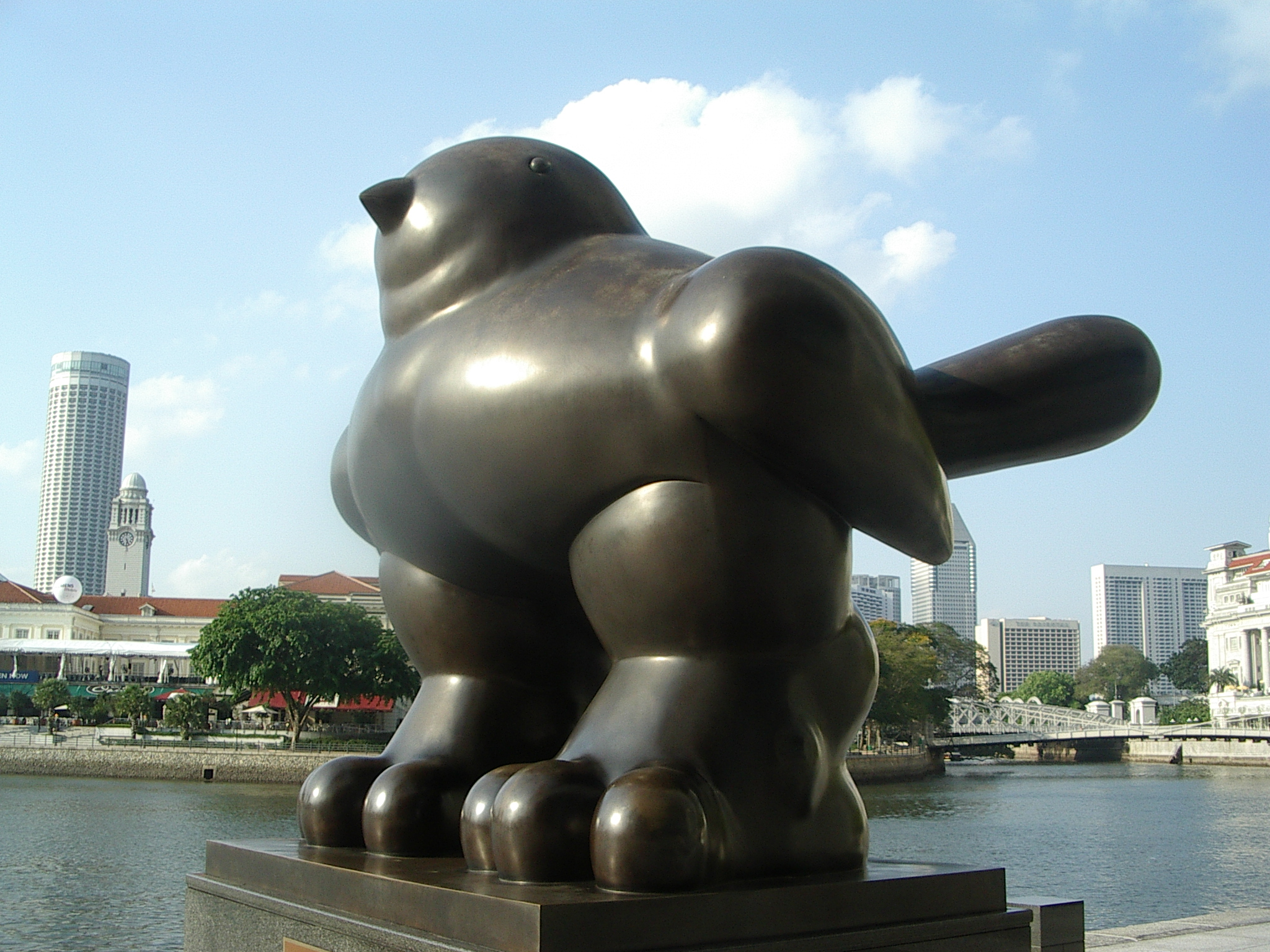
Bird (UOB Plaza, Singapore), sculpture of Colombian artist Fernando Botero

The Ecuadorean artist Oswaldo Guayasamín (1919–1999) represented, with his painting style, the feelings of the peoples of Latin America, highlighting social injustices in various parts of the world. The Colombian Fernando Botero (1932–2023) was one of the greatest exponents of painting and sculpture who was able to develop a recognizable style of his own. For his part, the Venezuelan Carlos Cruz-Diez has contributed significantly to contemporary art, with the presence of works around the world.

Currently, several emerging South American artists are recognized by international art critics: Guillermo Lorca, a Chilean painter, Teddy Cobeña, an Ecuadorian sculptor and recipient of an international sculpture award in France, and Argentine artist Adrián Villar Rojas, winner of the Zurich Museum Art Award, among many others.

=== Sport ===
A wide range of sports are played in the continent of South America, with football being the most popular overall, while baseball is the most popular in Venezuela.

Other sports include basketball, cycling, polo, volleyball, futsal, motorsports, rugby (mostly in Argentina and Uruguay), handball, tennis, golf, field hockey, boxing, and cricket.

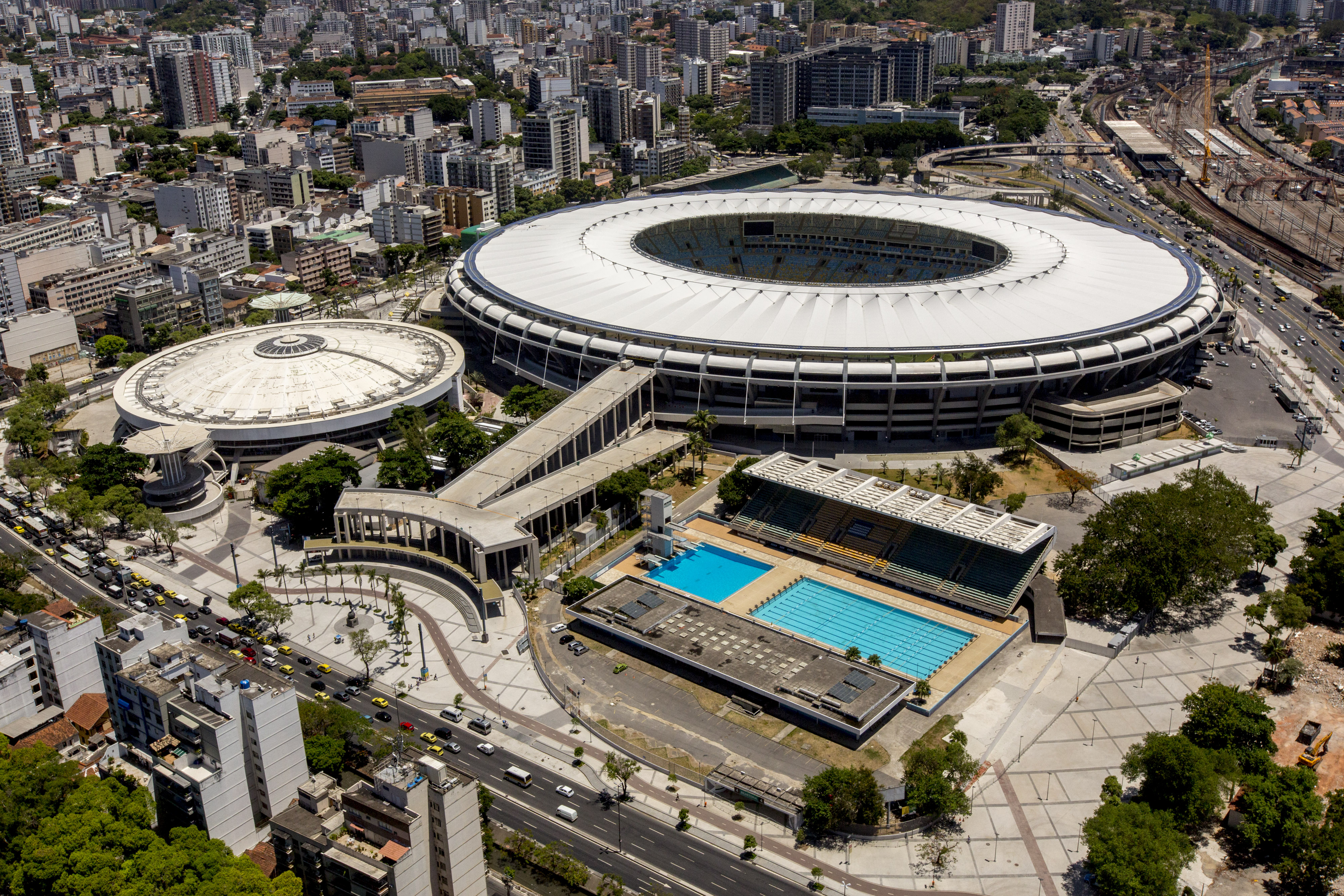
Maracanã Stadium in Rio de Janeiro, Brazil

South America hosted its first Olympic Games in Rio de Janeiro, Brazil, in 2016, and has hosted the Youth Olympic Games in Buenos Aires, Argentina, in 2018. A multi-sport event, the South American Games are held every four years. The first edition was held in La Paz in 1978, and the most recent took place in Santiago in 2014.

South America shares, with Europe, supremacy over football: all winners in the FIFA World Cup and FIFA Club World Cup have come from these two continents. Brazil has won the FIFA World Cup a record five times; Argentina three times, Uruguay twice. Five South American nations have hosted the tournament, including the first edition in Uruguay (1930). Two were in Brazil (1950, 2014), Chile (1962), and Argentina (1978). South America is home to the longest-running international football tournament, the Copa América, which has been contested since 1916. Argentina has won the Copa América 16 times, the most among all countries.

South American Cricket Championship is an international one-day cricket tournament played since 1995, featuring national teams from South America and certain other invited sides, including teams from North America; it is currently played annually, but until 2013, it was usually played every two seasons.

== See also ==
- Flags of South America
- List of islands of South America
- List of World Heritage Sites in South America
- South American Games – Multi-sport athletic event in South America

== Sources ==
This article incorporates text from a free content work. Licensed under CC BY 4.0 (license statement/permission). Text taken from Global Forest Resources Assessment 2025, Food and Agriculture Organization of the United Nations (FAO).
