= Portuguese Surinamese =

Surinamese of Portuguese birth or descent

Portuguese Surinamese people
Regions with significant populations
- Paramaribo, Wanica

Languages
- Dutch · Sranan Tongo · Portuguese · English

Religion
- Christianity (Roman Catholicism)

Related ethnic groups
- White Surinamese · Portuguese Guyanese · Portuguese Trinidadian and Tobagonian · Portuguese diaspora

Portuguese Surinamese people are Surinamese citizens of Portuguese ancestry.

== History ==
In 1853, the first Portuguese people arrived from the Portuguese island of Madeira, having been sponsored by a coalition of planters and by the colonial government. They were actually on their way to British Guiana, where the planters also sought alternative sources of labour after the abolition of slavery, but ended up in Suriname. A total of 500 Madeirans came as indentured workers to Suriname. At the end of their contract, they left the fields and sought an existence in the market. In later years, more immigrants from Madeira and British Guiana came to Suriname, however, no longer as indentured laborers but as free immigrants.

Portuguese Sephardic Jews had settled between the 15th and 16th centuries before the Dutch arrived. The first Portuguese Jews came from the Netherlands, Portugal and Italy to settle in the old capital Torarica.

== See also ==
- Portuguese diaspora
- Ethnic groups in Suriname
