= Demographics of South America =

South America population pyramid in 2023 based on the United Nations geoscheme for the Americas South America grouping.

As of 2017, South America has an estimated population of 418.76 million people.

== Population and density ==
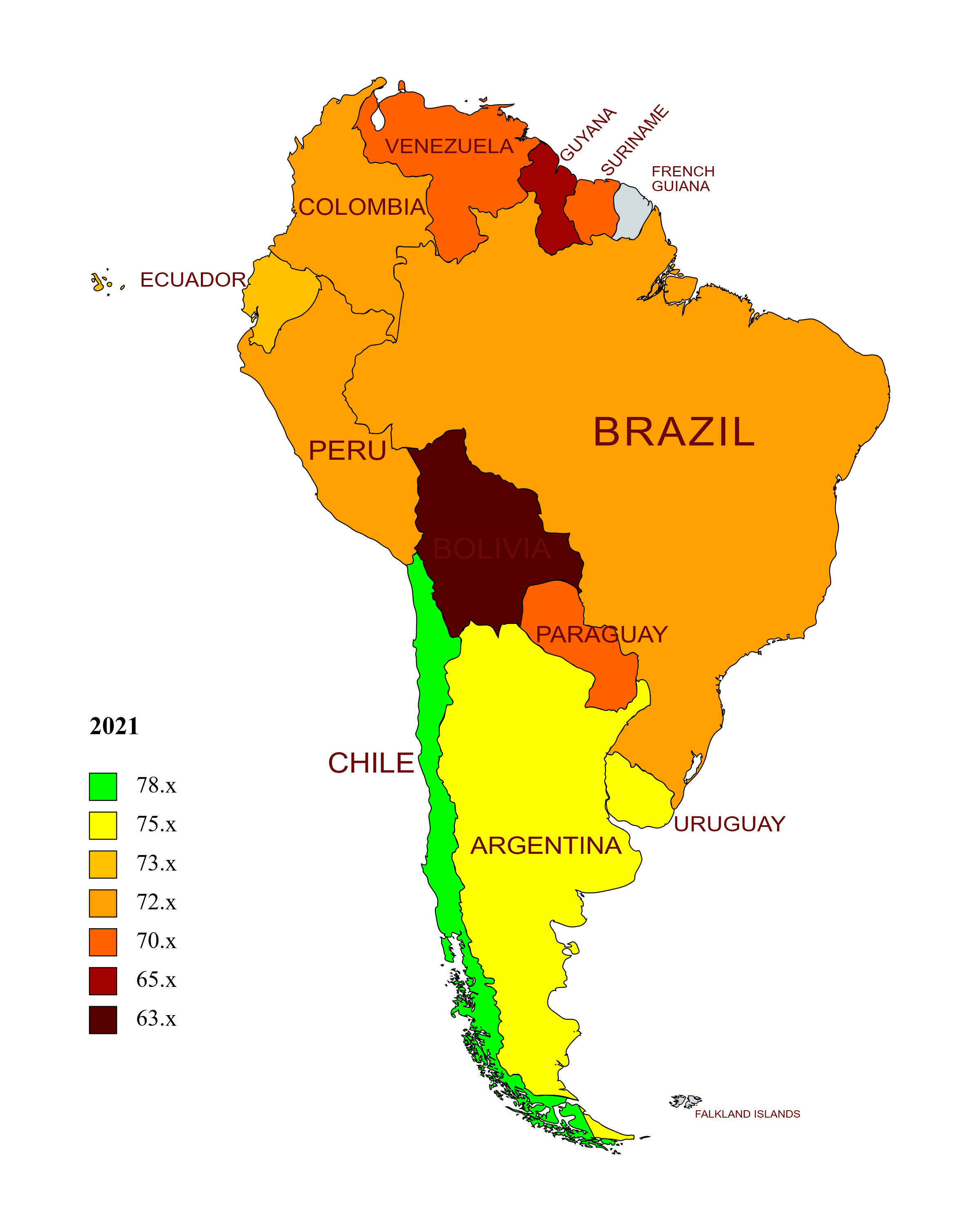
Life expectancy in South America in 2021

Country / Territory	Area (km^{2}) (sq mi)	Population (July 2017 est.)	Population density (per km^{2})	Capital
Argentina	2,766,890 km^{2} (1,068,300 sq mi)	44,293,293	16.0/km² (41.4/sq mi)	Buenos Aires
Bolivia	1,098,580 km^{2} (424,160 sq mi)	11,138,234	10.13/km² (26.3/sq mi)	La Paz and Sucre
Brazil	8,514,877 km^{2} (3,287,612 sq mi)	217,240,060	24.35/km² (63.1/sq mi)	Brasília
Chile	756,950 km^{2} (292,260 sq mi)	17,789,267	23.5/km² (60.9/sq mi)	Santiago
Colombia	1,138,910 km^{2} (439,740 sq mi)	47,698,524	41.88/km² (105.9/sq mi)	Bogotá
Ecuador	283,560 km^{2} (109,480 sq mi)	16,290,913	57.45/km² (148.8/sq mi)	Quito
Falkland Islands (United Kingdom)	12,173 km^{2} (4,700 sq mi)	3,198	0.26/km² (0.7/sq mi)	Stanley
French Guiana (France)	91,000 km^{2} (35,000 sq mi)	221,500	2.7/km² (5.4/sq mi)	Cayenne
Guyana	214,999 km^{2} (83,012 sq mi)	737,718	3.43/km² (8.9/sq mi)	Georgetown
Paraguay	406,750 km^{2} (157,050 sq mi)	6,943,739	17.07/km² (44.2/sq mi)	Asunción
Peru	1,285,220 km^{2} (496,230 sq mi)	31,036,656	24.14/km² (62.5/sq mi)	Lima
(South Georgia and the South Sandwich Islands) South Georgia and South Sandwich Islands (United Kingdom)	3,093 km^{2} (1,194 sq mi)	30	0/km² (0/sq mi)	Grytviken
Suriname	163,270 km^{2} (63,040 sq mi)	591,919	3.62/km² (9.4/sq mi)	Paramaribo
Uruguay	176,220 km^{2} (68,040 sq mi)	3,360,148	19.06/km² (49.4/sq mi)	Montevideo
Venezuela	912,050 km^{2} (352,140 sq mi)	31,304,016	34.32/km² (88.9/sq mi)	Caracas
Total	17,824,513	418,762,546	24.49/km^{2}	–

== Largest population centres ==
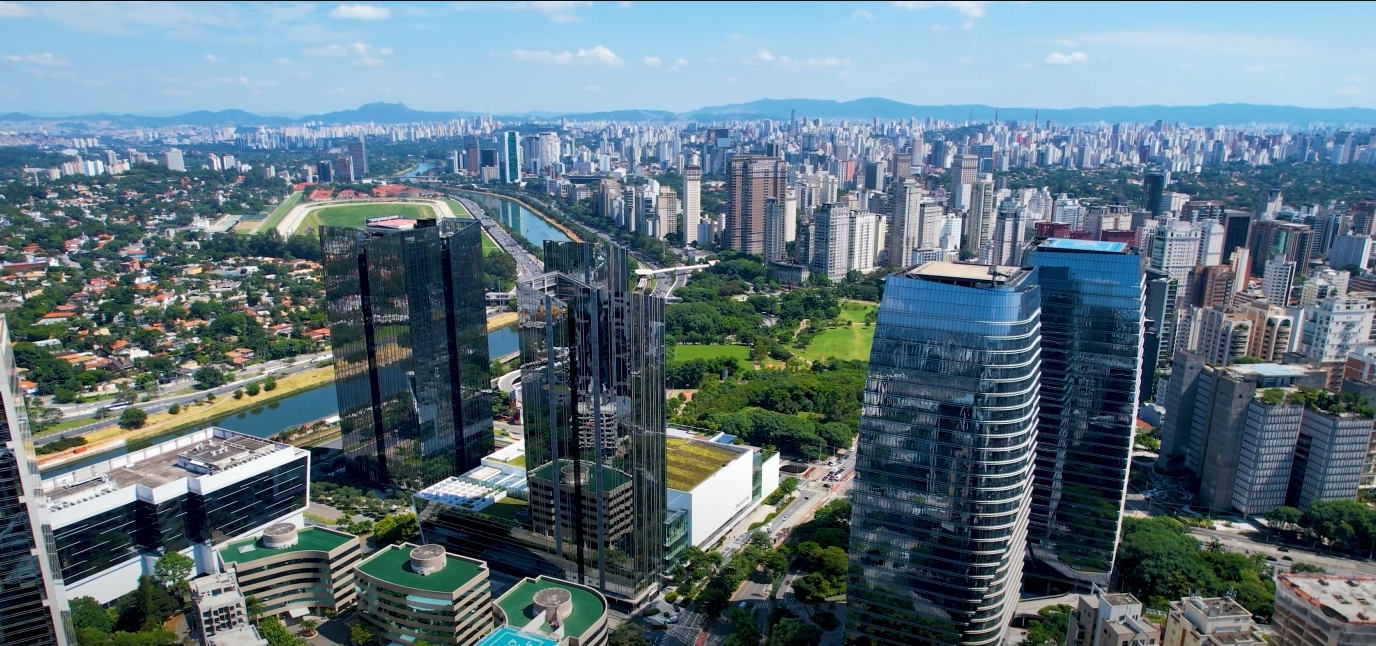
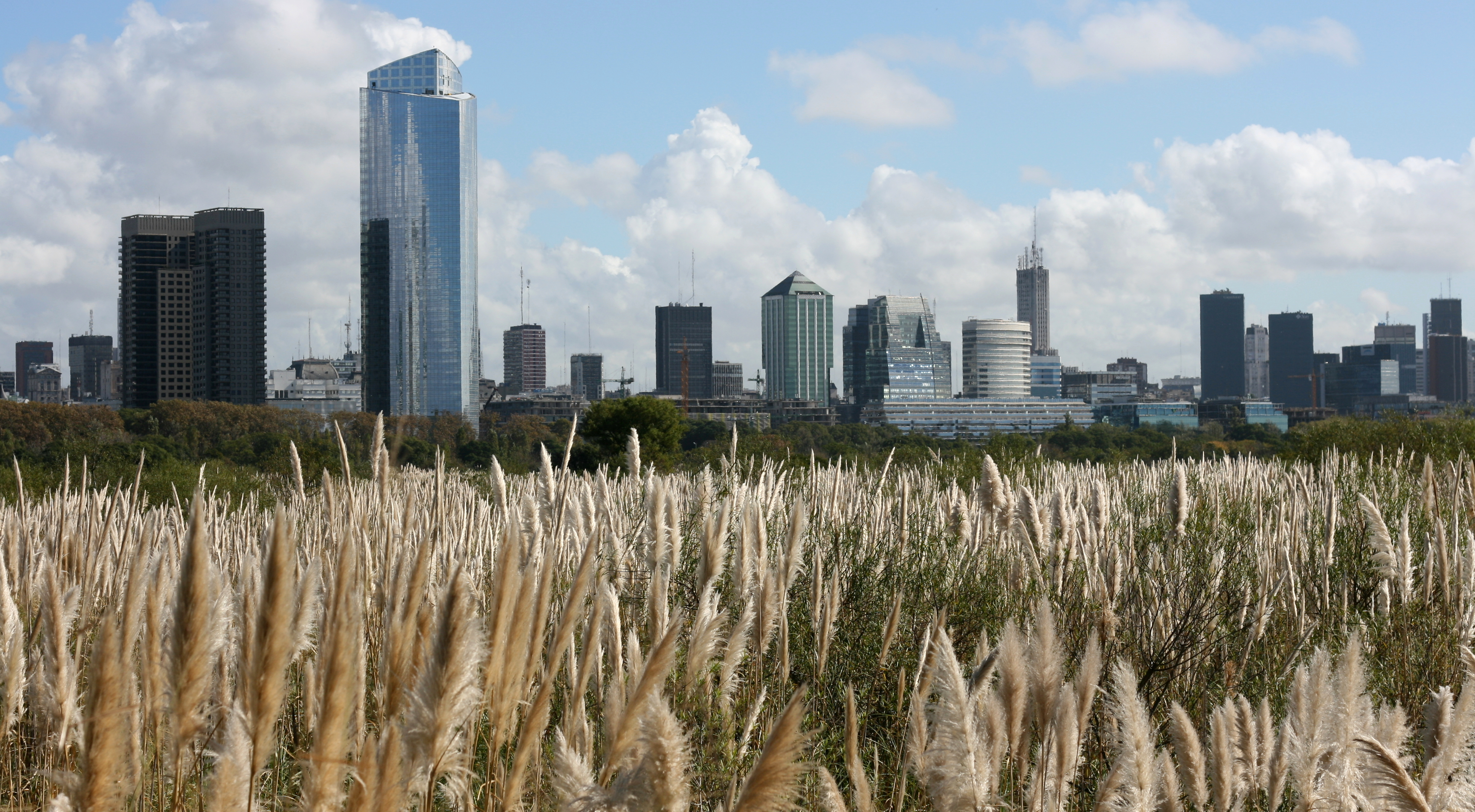
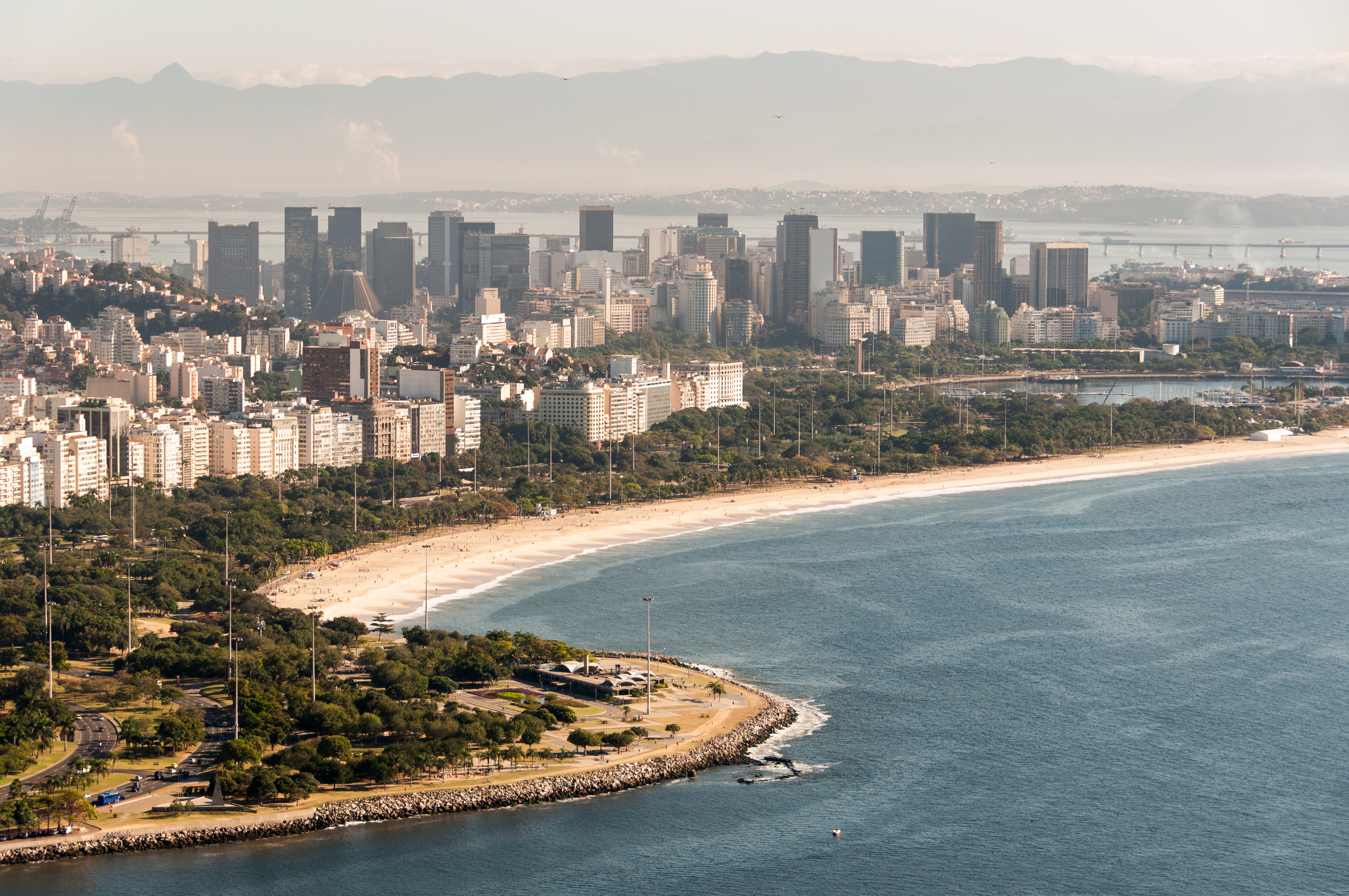
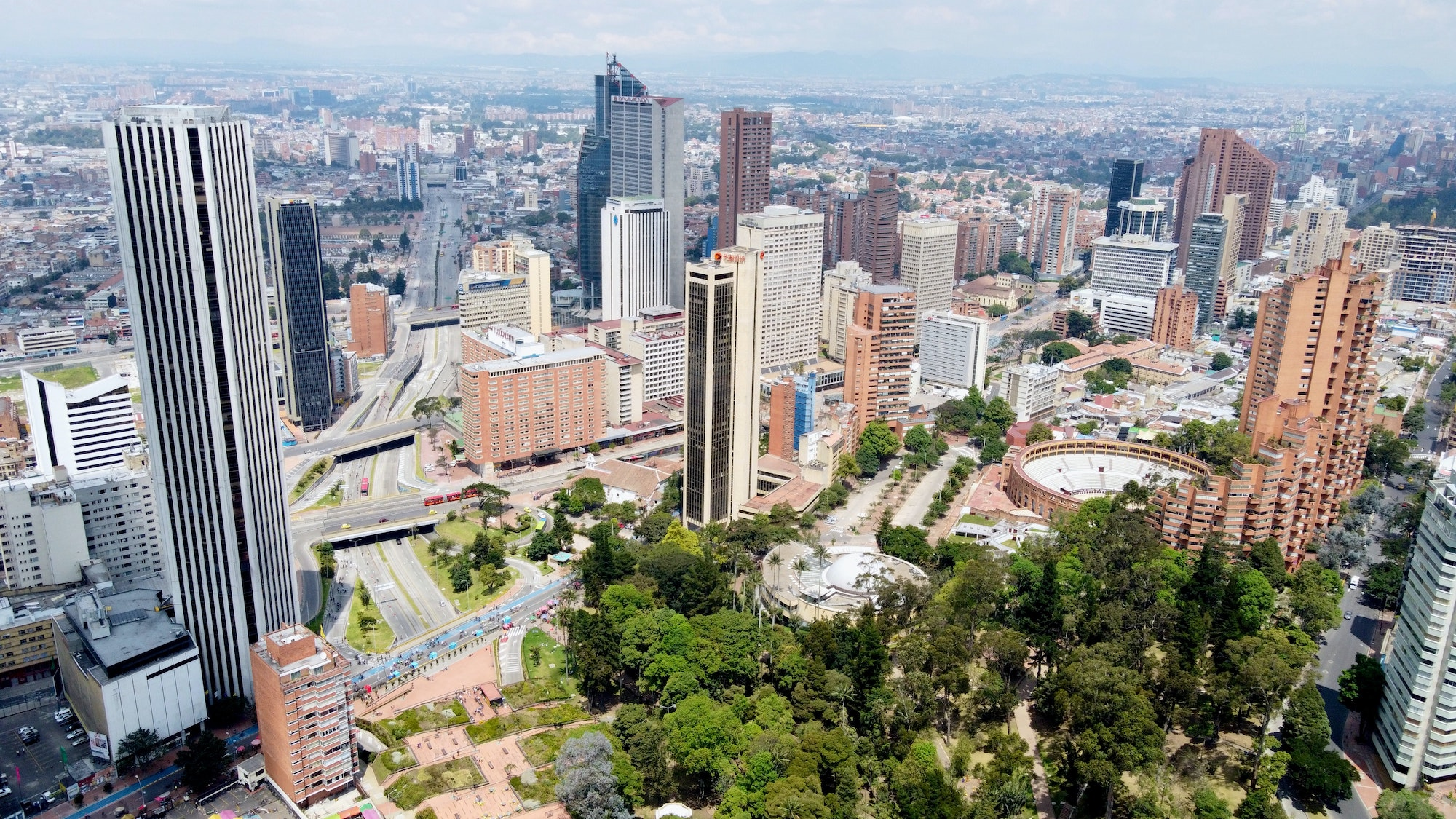
Largest population centres of South America by metropolitan area
	Rank	City name	Member state	Pop.	Rank	City name	Member state	Pop.
São Paulo Buenos Aires	1	São Paulo	Brazil	21,090,792	11	Fortaleza	Brazil	3,985,297	Rio de Janeiro Bogotá
São Paulo Buenos Aires	2	Buenos Aires	Argentina	13,693,657	12	Salvador	Brazil	3,953,290	Rio de Janeiro Bogotá
São Paulo Buenos Aires	3	Rio de Janeiro	Brazil	13,131,431	13	Recife	Brazil	3,914,397	Rio de Janeiro Bogotá
São Paulo Buenos Aires	4	Bogotá	Colombia	10,777,931	14	Medellín	Colombia	3,777,009	Rio de Janeiro Bogotá
São Paulo Buenos Aires	5	Lima	Peru	9,904,727	15	Curitiba	Brazil	3,502,804	Rio de Janeiro Bogotá
São Paulo Buenos Aires	6	Santiago	Chile	6,683,852	16	Campinas	Brazil	3,094,181	Rio de Janeiro Bogotá
São Paulo Buenos Aires	7	Belo Horizonte	Brazil	5,829,923	17	Guayaquil	Ecuador	2,952,159	Rio de Janeiro Bogotá
São Paulo Buenos Aires	8	Caracas	Venezuela	5,322,310	18	Cali	Colombia	2,911,278	Rio de Janeiro Bogotá
São Paulo Buenos Aires	9	Porto Alegre	Brazil	4,258,926	19	Quito	Ecuador	2,653,330	Rio de Janeiro Bogotá
São Paulo Buenos Aires	10	Brasília	Brazil	4,201,737	20	Maracaibo	Venezuela	2,576,836	Rio de Janeiro Bogotá

== Religion ==
An estimated 90.0% of South Americans are Christians (82% Catholic, 8% other Christian denominations mainly traditional Protestants and Evangelicals but also Orthodoxy), accounting for ca. 19% of Christians worldwide.

Crypto-Jews or Marranos, conversos, and Anusim were an important part of colonial life in Latin America.

Both Buenos Aires, Argentina and São Paulo, Brazil figure among the largest Jewish populations by urban area.

Japanese Buddhism and Shinto-derived Japanese new religions are common in Brazil and Peru. Korean Confucianism is especially found in Brazil while Chinese Buddhism and Chinese Confucianism is spread throughout the continent.

Kardecist Spiritism can be found in several countries.

Religions in South America as of 2013:

Religion in South America
Country	Christians	Catholics	Other Christians	No religion (atheists and agnostics)
Argentina	88%	77%	11%	11%
Bolivia	96%	74%	22%	4%
Brazil	86%	64%	22%	9%
Chile	70%	57%	13%	25%
Colombia	92%	80%	12%	7%
Ecuador	93%	80%	13%	7%
Guyana	63%	7%	56%	3%
Paraguay	95%	85%	10%	2%
Peru	94%	81%	13%	3%
Suriname	51%	29%	22%	5%
Uruguay	58%	47%	11%	41%
Venezuela	88%	71%	17%	8%

== Ethnicities ==
The demographics of South America is composed of ancestries from Indigenous peoples, Africans, Europeans, Anusim or Marranos, and to a lesser extent Arabs, Romanis, and East Asians. A mixture of Amerindian and European ancestry is often referred to as mestizo or caboclo/mameluco. Castizos are people whose DNA is mostly European with Indigenous markers assimilation. A mixture of Amerindian and African ancestry is referred to in many South American countries as zambo or cafuzo. A mixture of European and African ancestry is referred to as mulatto. A mix of European and Japanese is referred as ainoko or hafu. Chile administers Easter Island in the South Pacific, which is home to 2,500 Polynesians, the Rapa Nui people.

Ethnic distribution in South America
Country	Indigenous-descended	European-descended	Mestizos	Mulattos	African-descended	Zambos	East Asian-descended	South Asian-descended	Other
Argentina	1.0%	85.0%	14.0%	0.0%	0.0%	0.0%	0.0%	0.0%	0.0%
Bolivia	53.0%	14.0%	30.0%	2.4%	0.0%	0.5%	0.0%	0.0%	0.0%
Brazil	0.6%	43.5%	0.0%	0.0%	10.2%	0.0%	0.4%	0.0%	45.3%
Chile	3.0%	52.0 %	48.0%	0.0%	0.0%	0.0%	0.0%	0.0%	0.0%
Colombia	9.5%	26.4%	50.3%	4.4%	9.0%	0.0%	0.4%	0.0%	0.0%
Ecuador	25.0%	9.9%	56.1%	3.9%	5.0%	0.0%	0.1%	0.0%	0.0%
Guyana	10.5%	1.5%	0.0%	0.0%	29.3%	0.0%	0.0%	39.8%	19.9%
Paraguay	3.0%	43.0%	55.0%	0.5%	0.0%	0.0%	0.0%	0.0%	0.0%
Peru	37.0%	20.0%	38.0%	2.0%	0.0%	0.0%	3.0%	0.0%	0.0%
Suriname	3.8%	1.0%	0.0%	15.7%	21.7%	0.0%	1.5%	27.4%	28.4%
Uruguay	0.0%	88.0%	8.0%	4.0%	0.0%	0.0%	0.0%	0.0%	0.0%
Venezuela	2.7%	42.7%	49.7%	7.7%	2.0%	0.0%	0.8%	0.0%	0.0%

South America is home to 400 million people, of which 180 million is composed of Whites with several different European extractions, as well as people with other lineages including 17 million Levantine Arabs, mostly Christians from the Levant region, (found in Brazil, Argentina, Venezuela, Colombia and Chile), 440 thousand Ashkenazi and Sephardi Jews (mostly Argentina and Brazil, with both figuring among the top 10 largest Jewish diasporas) and 1.3 million Crypto-Jews or Anusim.

Brazil has 31 million Italians and Argentina 20, Uruguay, Venezuela, Peru, Chile, Colombia and Ecuador also have considerable Italian diasporas. Brazil has 15.7 million Germans, Austrians, Luxembourgers and Swiss (second largest German diaspora after US) and Argentina 3.5 million consisting mostly of Russian Volga Germans. Other German groups can be found in Chile, Bolivia (mostly Mennonites), Paraguay (mostly German-Brazilians but including Mennonites), Peru, Uruguay and colonies in Venezuela.

Brazil has the largest Slavic population with the number of Poles reaching 3 million people, followed by Ukrainians and Russians but comprising many other nationalities. This is followed by Argentina, then Chile.

Brazil has the largest Dutch and Scandinavian (mostly Norwegian) populations as well as the largest Lithuanian diaspora outside Baltic states. A small number of Boers or White Afrikaners migrated to South America during the 20th century, heading especially to Argentina and Brazil. And Lithuanian refugees fleeing the Nazi invasion and Soviet annexation in WW2 also formed communities in Colombia and Venezuela. Brazil also comprises the largest Hungarian, Estonian and Finnish diasporas, being followed by Argentina in terms of nationalities of Uralic languages. Argentina has the largest French and Irish populations, respectively 6 million and 1 million, while Argentine Patagonia is home to Welsh and Swedish colonies. Brazil and Chile are also home to considerable French ancestry populations. A great part of the French immigrants in Chile were of Basque descent, with the number of Basques estimated at 4 million. Chile has 800 thousand British and Irish people. Brazil and Argentina also have sizable British Latin American populations, being the responsible for the introduction of football in the 19th century.

The number of Romani people revolves around 1.120 million, with a possibility of being much higher, being spread all over the continent. Most of the Romanis in Brazil are of Eastern European and Baltic background, while most of the Romani people in Argentina, Chile and Colombia came from Spain.

Most East Indian Hindus and Muslims live in Guyana and Suriname which is also home to a large Muslim Javanese community. East Indians are the vast majority in Guyana, followed by Blacks and also the majority in Suriname where they are followed by Maroons and Creoles. Indonesians from the island of Java make 13.7% of Suriname's population which figures as 275 thousand Javanese people. Dutch Surinamese or Boeroes make the minority of the country due to the fact that most of the Dutch emigrated to the Netherlands after Suriname's independence.

South America is home to over 5 million Asians, mostly East Asians, with Brazil and Peru having the largest Asian-Latin American populations. Peru and Venezuela have greatly numerous 19th century Chinese coolie populations with almost 1.9 million Chinese people combined. Peru itself is home to over 1.4 million Chinese Peruvians, mostly arriving as indentured servants. The Asian-Brazilian population is mostly composed of Japanese descendants and Japanese nationals, but it also comprises over 250 thousand Chinese and 50 thousand Taiwanese recent immigrants. Colombia, Argentina and Ecuador also follow in numbers of Chinese immigrants. Brazil is home to the largest Japanese and Korean populations in the continent with respectively 1.8 million and 140 thousand people. The Nipponic or Nipponese population in Brazil is the largest Japanese diaspora outside Japan. Koreans can also be found in Argentina, Colombia, Paraguay and Chile. Peru is home to 160 thousand Japanese descendants, and Nipponese populations are also found in Argentina, Bolivia, Paraguay, Chile and Venezuela. Argentina is home to the largest Filipino population with 15 thousand people. Other Asian nationalities can be found in smaller numbers, such as South Asians or East Indians, Southeast Asians and Central Asians. Brazil has 5 thousand Vietnamese people, 10 thousand East Indians, as well as 5 thousand Afghans, and a small number of Iranians. Argentina also have small numbers of Southern Asians or East Indians, while being home to most Southeast Asians, mostly Filipino.

Brazil is home to the largest Euro-Latin Americans population in absolute numbers constituting 98 million people. Uruguay has the largest percentage with 90.7% being Caucasian or over 3 million people. Argentina equally corresponds to the second largest population and percentage with 39 million people, followed by Colombia with 18m, Venezuela 13.1m, Chile 9.5m, Peru 5.8m, Bolivia 2m, Paraguay 1.3m and Ecuador with 980 thousand.

Roughly 14% of the population in French Guiana is of European ancestry, numbering at 35 thousand people. The vast majority of these are of French heritage, though there are also people of Dutch, British, Spanish and Portuguese ancestry. Countries that make part of South America but do not have Romance languages as their official national languages are Guyana, Suriname and the Falkland Islands. Suriname has 2% of Europeans and Levantines or 12 thousand people, including Lebanese and Jews. Most Boeroes or Dutch Surinamese left after independence in 1975. There are less than 3 thousand Whites in Guyana where 0.5% of the population is counted as "others". The Falkland Islands have a low population density. According to the 2012 census, the average daily population of the Falklands was 2,932, excluding military personnel serving in the archipelago and their dependents. The Falklands are a homogeneous society, with the majority of inhabitants descended from Scottish and Welsh immigrants who settled the territory in 1833. Other groups are English, French, Gibraltarian, Scandinavian, Saint Helenian and Argentine.

Afro-Latin Americans and Mulatto population are respectively 18 and 48 million, combined 66 million.

=== Indigenous people ===
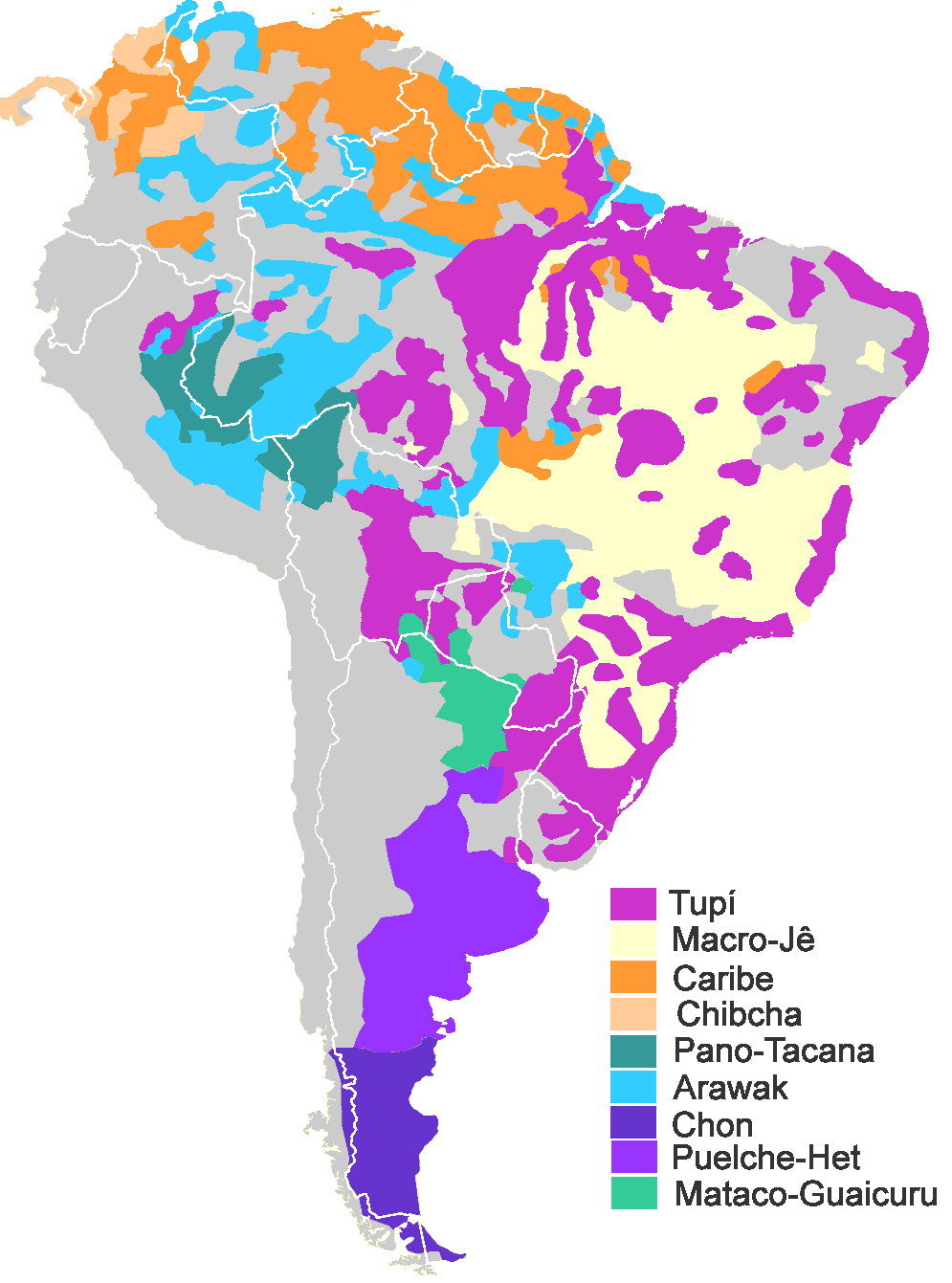
Main indigenous language families of South America (except Quechua, Aymaran, and Mapuche).

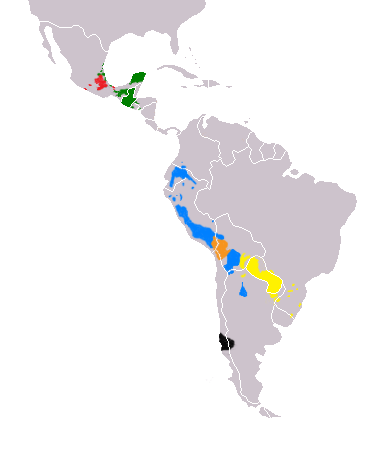
Main native languages in Latin America, legend: Quechua / Guarani / Aymara; Nahuatl / Mayan languages / Mapuche

Indigenous people make up about half of the population of Bolivia. In many places indigenous people still practice a traditional lifestyle based on subsistence agriculture or as hunter-gatherers. There are still some uncontacted tribes residing in the Amazon rainforest.

==== Argentina ====
Argentina's indigenous population in 2010 was about 900,329 (2.38% of total population); this figure includes 457,363 people who self-identified as belonging to an indigenous ethnic group, and the remaining 142,966 who recognized themselves as first-generation descendants of an Amerindian people. The ten most populous indigenous people are the Mapuche (113,680 people), the Kolla (70,505), the Toba (69,452) and the Guaraní (68,454).

==== Bolivia ====
In Bolivia, a 62% majority of residents over the age of 15 self-identify as belonging to an indigenous people, while another 3.7% grew up with an indigenous mother tongue yet do not self-identify as indigenous. Including both of these categories, and children under 15, some 66.4% of Bolivia's population was registered as indigenous in the 2001 Census. The largest indigenous ethnic groups are: Quechua (about 2,500,000 people), Aymara (2,000,000), Chiquitano (181.000), Guaraní (126.000) and Mojeño (69,000).

==== Brazil ====
The Amerindians make up 0.4% of Brazil's population, or about 700,000 people. Indigenous people are found in the entire territory of Brazil, although the majority of them live in indigenous territories in the North and Centre-Western part of the country. On 18 January 2007, FUNAI reported that it had confirmed the presence of 67 different uncontacted tribes in Brazil, up from 40 in 2005. With this addition Brazil has now overtaken the island of New Guinea as the country having the largest number of uncontacted tribes.

==== Chile ====
According to the 2002 Census, 4.6% of the Chilean population (including the Rapanui of Easter Island) 692,000 people were self-identified of indigenous origins. Many are descendants of the Mapuche, and live in Santiago, Araucanía and the lake district. Other groups include the Aimara who live mainly in Arica-Parinacota and Tarapacá Region and has the mayority of their alikes living in Bolivia and Peru and the Alacalufe survivors who now reside mainly in Puerto Edén.

==== Colombia ====
Colombia's indigenous people nonetheless encompass at least 85 distinct cultures and more than 1,378,884 people. A variety of collective rights for indigenous people are recognized in the 1991 Constitution. One of these is the Muisca culture, a subset of the larger Chibcha ethnic group, known for their use of gold, which led to the legend of El Dorado.

==== Ecuador ====
At the present the 25% of Ecuador's population is of indigenous heritage. Approximately 96.4% of Ecuador's Indigenous population are Highland Quichuas living in the valleys of the Sierra region. Primarily consisting of the descendants of Incans, they are Kichwa speakers and include the Caranqui, the Otavaleños, the Cayambi, the Quitu-Caras, the Panzaleo, the Chimbuelo, the Salasacan, the Tugua, the Puruhá, the Cañari, and the Saraguro.

==== Peru ====
Indigenous population in Peru make up around 25%. Native Peruvian traditions and customs have shaped the way Peruvians live and see themselves today. Cultural citizenship—or what Renato Rosaldo has called, "the right to be different and to belong, in a democratic, participatory sense" (1996:243)—is not yet very well developed in Peru. This is perhaps no more apparent than in the country's Amazonian regions where indigenous societies continue to struggle against state-sponsored economic abuses, cultural discrimination, and pervasive violence.

==== Venezuela ====
Indigenous population in Venezuela form about 2% of the total population, although many Venezuelans share some indigenous ancestry. Indigenous people are concentrated in the Southern Amazon rainforest state of Amazonas, where they make up nearly 50% of the population and in the Andes of the western state of Zulia. The most numerous indigenous people, at about 200,000, is the Venezuelan part of the Wayuu (or Guajiro) people who primarily live in Zulia between Lake Maracaibo and the Colombian border. Another 100,000 or so indigenous people live in the sparsely populated southeastern states of Amazonas, Bolívar, and Delta Amacuro.

== See also ==
- Central America#Demographics
- Latin America#Demographics
