= Netherlands–Suriname relations =

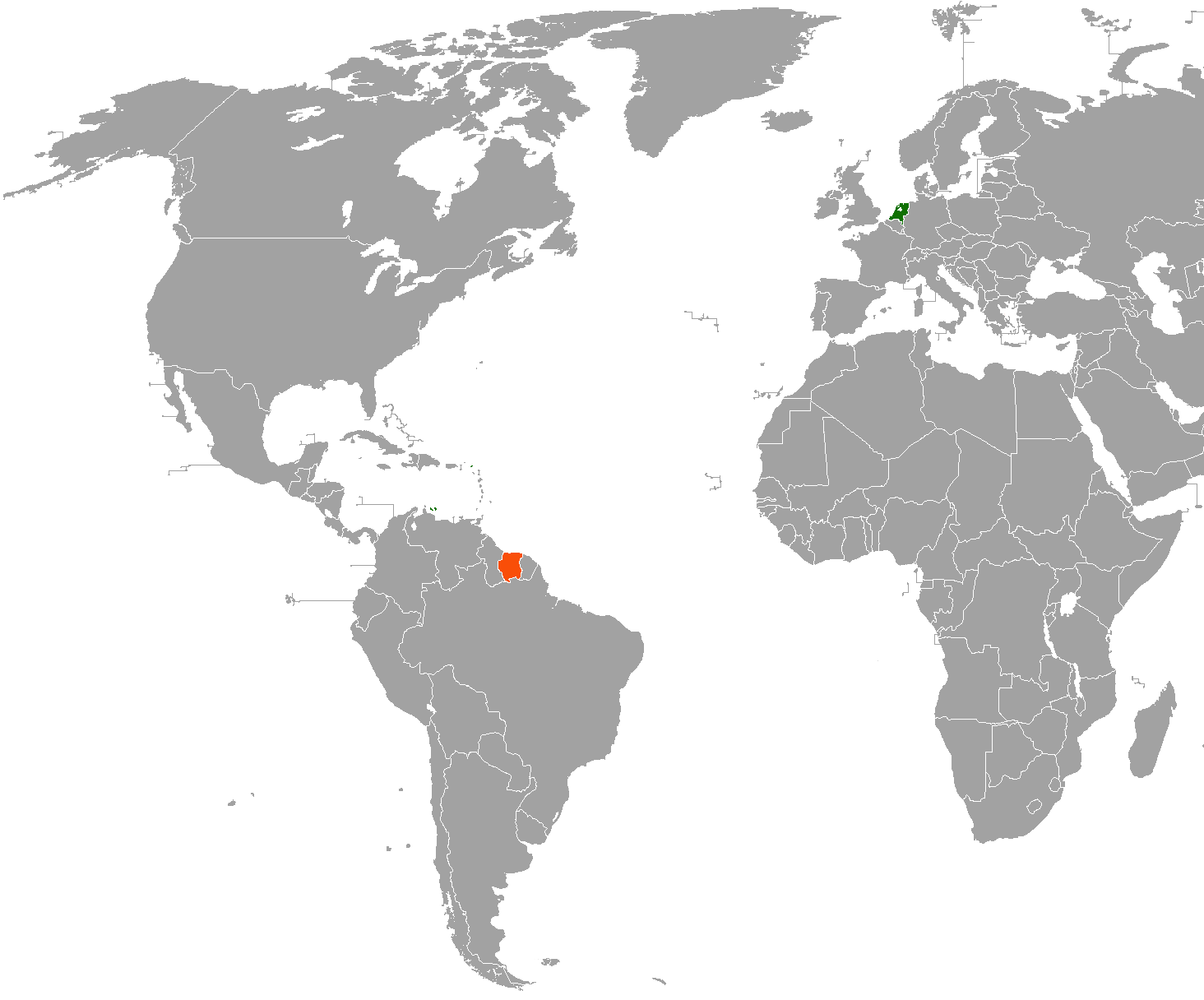
- Netherlands: Suriname

Netherlands–Suriname relations refers to the current and historical relations between the Netherlands and Suriname. Both nations share historic ties and a common language (Dutch) and are members of the Dutch Language Union.

== History ==
=== Dutch colonization ===
In February 1667, Suriname became a Dutch colony after the signing of the Treaty of Breda between the Netherlands and the United Kingdom which ended the Second Anglo-Dutch War. In exchange for sugar-rich Guiana, the Netherlands surrendered New Netherland (in present-day United States) to the British. Immediately, the Dutch West India Company became partial owner of the colony and began importing slaves from West Africa to work on the sugar, cotton, coffee and indigo plantations in the colony. Surinam became the most important colony in the Americas for the Netherlands after the loss of Dutch Brazil in 1654. In the 1700s, many African slaves known as Maroons began escaping to the south of the colony and creating their own tribes and began a small uprising against Dutch rule. In 1762, the Maroons won their freedom and signed a treaty with the Dutch Crown to acknowledge their territorial rights and trading privileges.

From 1799 to 1816, Suriname became a British colony after the Netherlands became part of the First French Empire under Napoléon Bonaparte. After the end of the Napoleonic Wars, the Netherlands regained its independence and Surinam was returned to the Dutch. In 1863, the Dutch ended the slave trade and in need of new labor, began importing Javanese people from the Dutch East Indies (Indonesia) and from India and China to work in Surinam as indentured laborers. At the same time, several thousand poor Dutch farmers left the Netherlands to work in the colony. By the early 20th century, production in Surinam moved to rubber, gold and bauxite, the latter becoming the biggest export of the colony (used for the production of aluminum).

=== Independence ===
During World War II, Surinam was host to U.S. soldiers after the Netherlands was invaded by Germany in 1940 and the royal family fled to exile in Canada. In 1942, Prince Bernhard, husband of Dutch Crown Princess Juliana visited the colony. In 1943, Crown Princess Juliana paid a visit to Surinam. Several primarily white Surinamese fought for the Liberation of the Netherlands during the war. Surinam became an important provider of bauxite for the war.

At the end of World War II, the Netherlands began providing more autonomy to Surinam. The Charter for the Kingdom of the Netherlands came into effect in December 1954, granting Surinam full autonomy within the nation, except in areas of defence, foreign policy, and nationality. After the independence of the Dutch colony of Indonesia, the Netherlands searched for ways to grant independence for its colonies in the Americas, as maintaining the colonies was too costly. In 1973, Dutch Prime Minister Joop den Uyl declared that its last remaining Dutch colonies would become independent during his administration. Only Surinam seemed motivated for independence, however, obtaining its independence on 25 November 1975, and changing its name to "Suriname". Crown Princess Beatrix of the Netherlands and Prime Minister den Uyl were in attendance at the independence ceremony in Paramaribo.

=== Post Independence ===
Soon after Suriname obtained its independence, most Europeans returned to the Netherlands. Around 300,000 Surinamese also decided to move to Europe and take Dutch citizenship. In February 1980 Dési Bouterse, head of the Surinamese military, staged a violent coup d'état against Prime Minister Henck Arron and Bouterse became de facto military leader of the nation. In December 1982, 15 prominent young men, most of them journalists and lawyers, criticized the military dictatorship of Bouterse. These 15 men were rounded up and taken to Fort Zeelandia (the then headquarters of Bouterse) where they were tortured and killed. The incident became known as the "December murders". As a result of the murders, the Netherlands froze all development aid to Suriname.

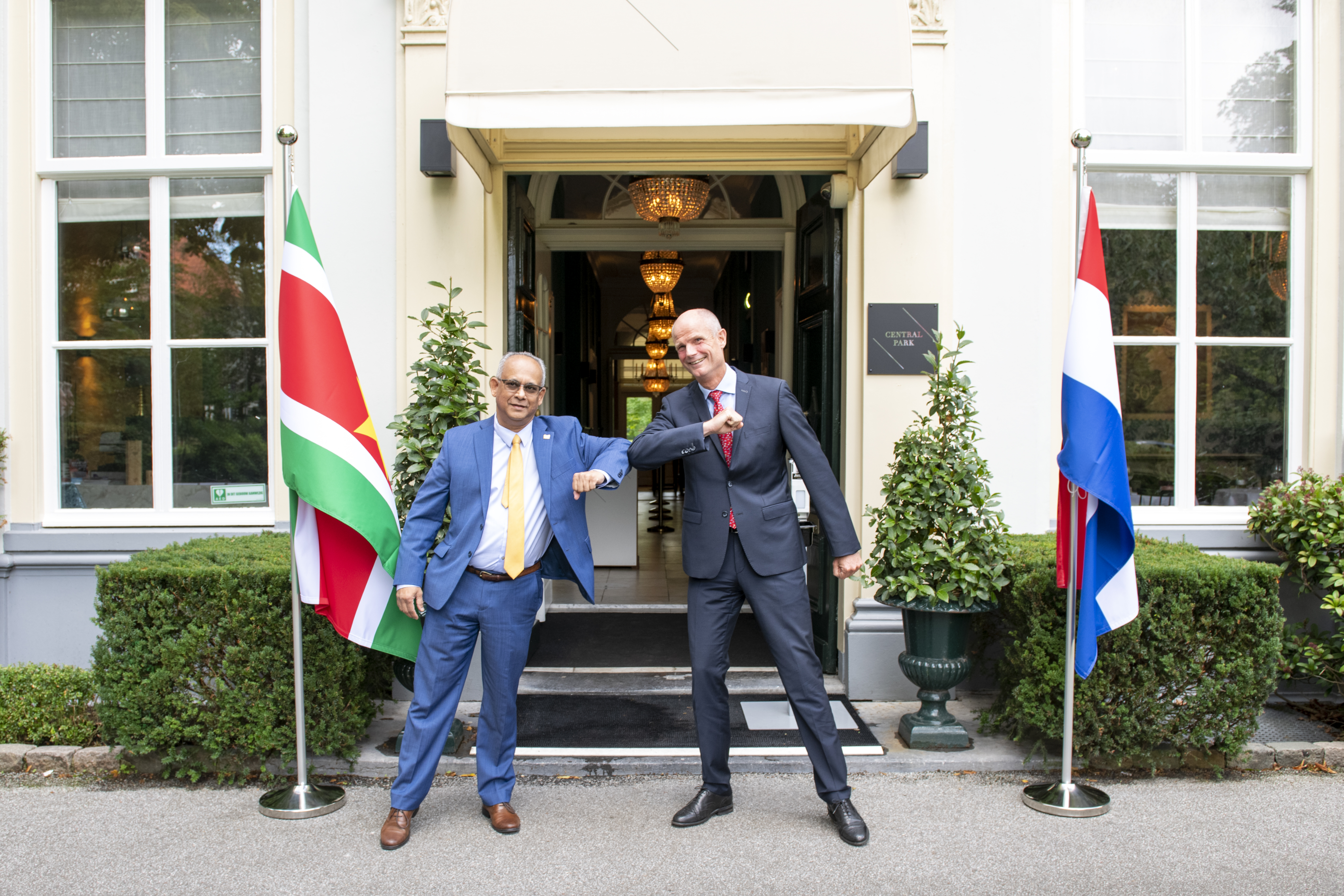
Surinamese Minister of Foreign Affairs Albert Ramdin visiting his Dutch counterpart Stef Blok in August 2020.

From 1986 to 1992, Suriname was embattled in a civil war known as the Surinamese Interior War against mainly Maroon fighters. In 1986, the Netherlands planned an invasion of Suriname to remove Bouterse from power, which was called off at the last minute. In 1999, Bouterse was convicted in absentia by a court in the Netherlands to 11 years imprisonment for drug trafficking. In 2007, Bouterse was charged for the December murders. In 2010, Bouterse became President of Suriname and therefore immune to prosecution. Since his return to power, the Netherlands has had limited contact with the Surinamese government and has stated that Bouterse is not welcome in the Netherlands. In 2013, the Netherlands called for the arrest of Bouterse in South Africa where he was attending the funeral of Nelson Mandela.

After the 2020 Surinamese general election and the appointment of Chan Santokhi as president, both Suriname and the Netherlands expressed the desire to restore diplomatic relations and to reappoint ambassadors. Santokhi stressed that the current financial crisis will lead to a re-evaluation of the existing diplomatic missions. In August 2020, Minister of Foreign Affairs Albert Ramdin was the first Surinamese member of government in ten years to pay an official visit to the Netherlands.

== High-level visits ==
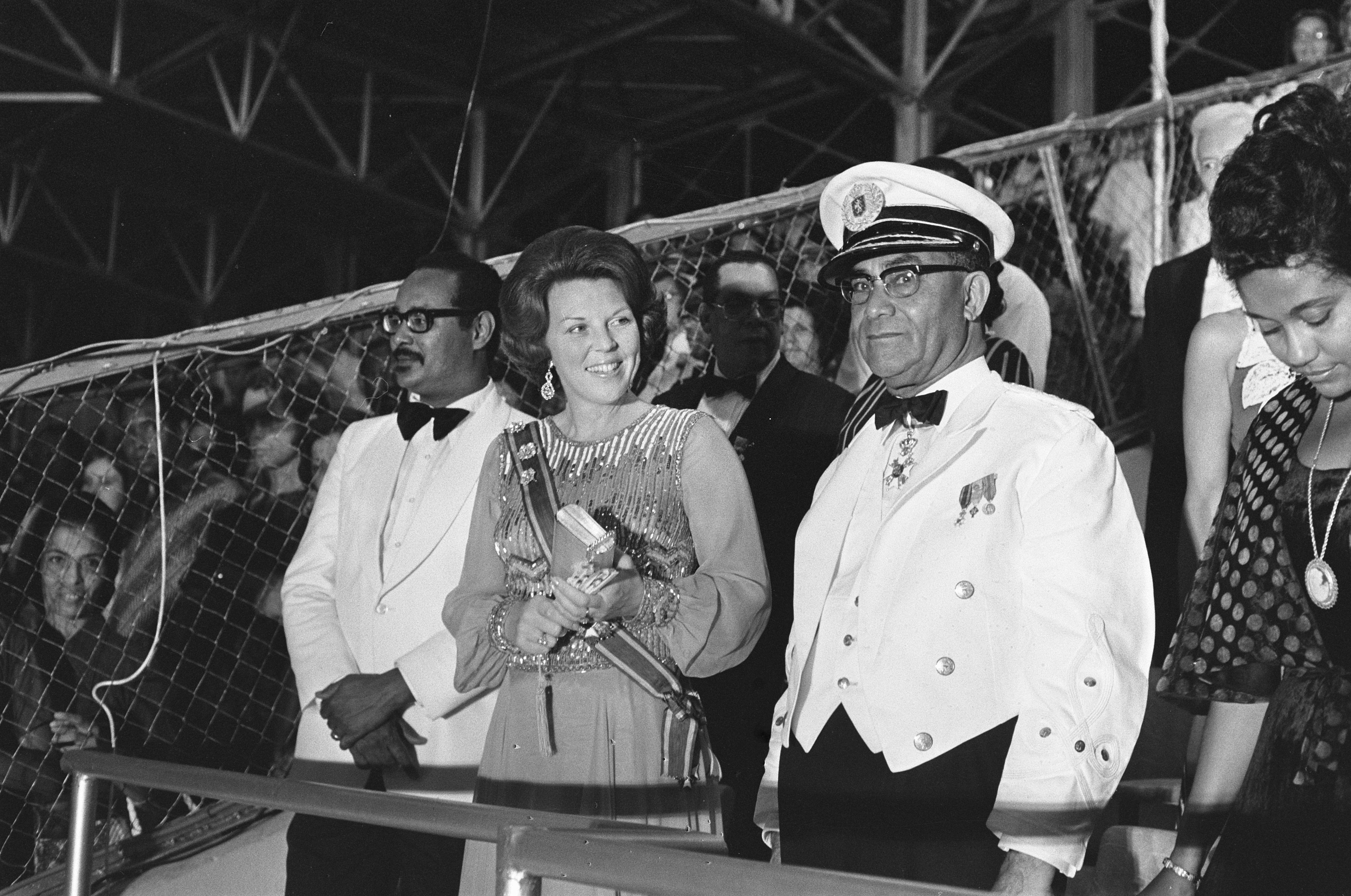
Dutch Crown Princess Beatrix attending the independence ceremony of Suriname along with Surinamese Prime Minister Henck Arron (left) and Surinamese President Johan Ferrier (right) on 25 November 1975.

Royal and Prime Ministerial visits from the Netherlands to Suriname

- Prince Bernhard of Lippe-Biesterfeld (1942)
- Crown Princess Juliana of the Netherlands (1943)
- Queen Juliana of the Netherlands (1955, 1978)
- Crown Princess Beatrix of the Netherlands (1975)
- Prime Minister Joop den Uyl (1975)
- Prime Minister Jan Peter Balkenende (2005, 2008)
- Prime Minister Mark Rutte (2022)

Presidential visits from Suriname to the Netherlands

- President Johan Ferrier (1977)
- President Ronald Venetiaan (2006)
- President Chan Santokhi (2021)

== Trade ==
In 2016, trade between the Netherlands and Suriname totaled 174 million Euros. Dutch exports to Suriname include: chemical based products, machinery, electrical and transport equipment. Surinamese exports to the Netherlands include: live animals and food, raw materials and beverages. The Netherlands ranks second among countries from which Suriname imports goods and services, after the United States.

== Resident diplomatic missions ==
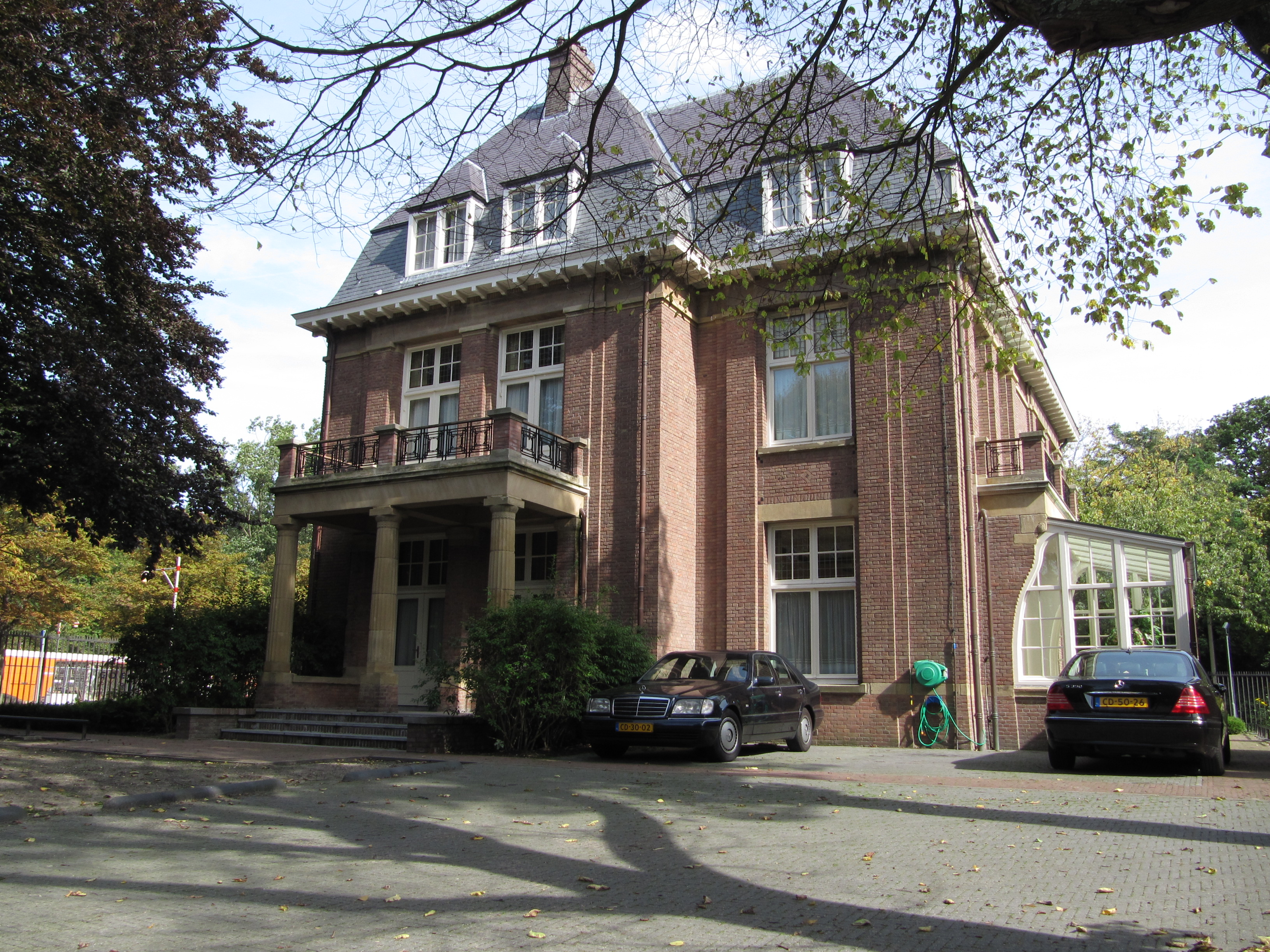
Embassy of Suriname in The Hague

- Netherlands has an embassy in Paramaribo.
- Suriname has an embassy The Hague and consulates-general in Amsterdam and in Willemstad, Curaçao.

=== Ambassadors of Suriname to the Netherlands ===
- Wim van Eer (1975–1980)
- Hans Prade (1981–1982)
- Henk Herrenberg (1982–1984)
- Henk Heidweiller (1984–1985)

In July 1985, Dirk Jan van Houten, was expelled. The Netherlands responded by expelling Heidweiller. Diplomatic affairs were handled by chargé d'affaires.

- Cyrill Ramkisor (1988–1994)
- Evert Gonesh (1994–2001)
- Edgar Amanh (2001–2006)
- Urmila Joella-Sewnundun (2006–2010)

No ambassadors appointed. Only chargé d'affaires.

- Rajendre Khargi (2021–)

=== Ambassadors of the Netherlands to Suriname ===
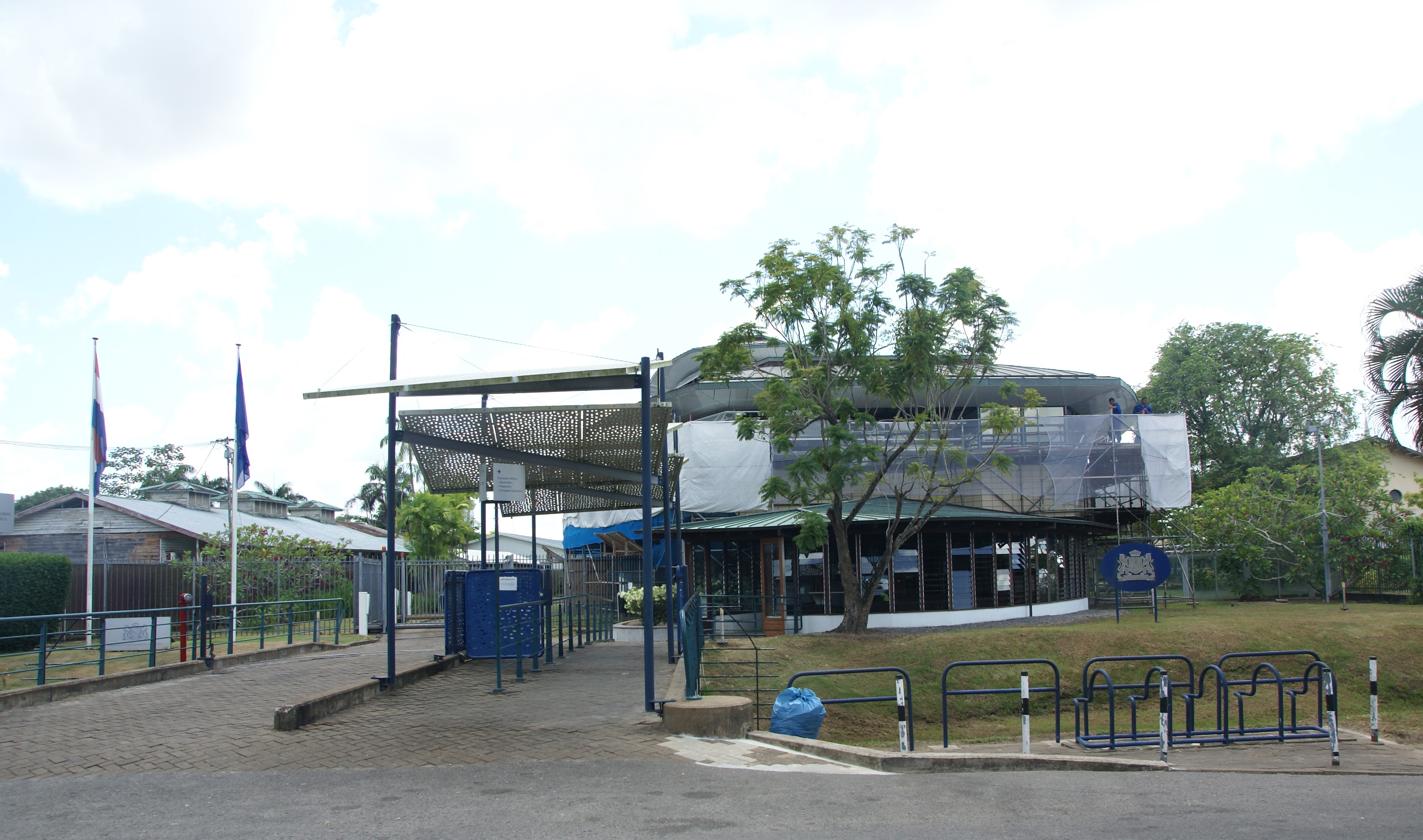
Embassy of the Netherlands in Paramaribo

- Hendricus Leopold (1975–1978)
- Maximilien Vegelin van Claerbergen (1978–1981)
- Joop Hoekman (1981–1983)
- Dirk Jan van Houten (1984–1985)

No ambassadors appointed. Only chargé d'affaires.

- Joop Hoekman (1988–1990)
- Pieter Koch (1990–1994)
- Schelto baron van Heemstra (1994–1998)
- Ruud Treffers (1998–2002)
- Henk Soeters (2002–2006)
- Tanya van Gool 2006–2009)
- Aart Jacobi (2009–2012)

Jacobi was recalled in April 2012 after the Bouterse government passed the amnesty law for the December murders. Diplomatic affairs were handled by chargé d'affaires.

- Henk van der Zwan (2021–)

== See also ==
- Foreign relations of the Netherlands
- Foreign relations of Suriname
- Dutch Empire
- Dutch Surinamese
- Surinamese people in the Netherlands
