= Van der Zwan =

Van der Zwan is a Dutch surname. Notable people with the surname include:

- Fred van der Zwan, Dutch water polo player
- E. Van der Zwan, Dutch Korfball player and famous high school teacher
- Henk van der Zwan, Dutch diplomat
- Niels van der Zwan, former rower
