= Hendricus Leopold =

Dutch diplomat

Ambassador of the Netherlands to India
- In office 1978–1983

Ambassador of the Netherlands to Suriname
- In office 26 November 1975 – 8 December 1978
- Preceded by: office established
- Succeeded by: Maximilien Vegelin van Claerbergen

Personal details
- Born: 29 August 1918 Middelburg, Netherlands
- Died: 16 July 2008 (aged 89) Lochem, Netherlands

Hendricus Leopold (29 August 1918 – 16 July 2008) was a Dutch diplomat. He helped prepare the opening of an embassy in Indonesia. He served as first ambassador of the Netherlands to Suriname, and as ambassador to India.

== Biography ==
Leopold was born on 29 August 1918 in Middelburg. He started working for the Ministry of Foreign Affairs. In 1963, he was appointed quarter maker in Jakarta to prepare the opening of the first embassy in Indonesia.

In March 1975, Leopold was sent to Suriname to establish a pre-embassy in preparation of the independence of Suriname. On 26 November 1975, the day after independence, he was installed as first ambassador to Suriname. In 1978, he was appointed ambassador to India and non-resident ambassador to Sri Lanka. In 1983, he retired.

Leopold died on 16 July 2008 in Lochem, at the age of 89.

== Honours ==
- Netherlands: Knight of the Order of Orange-Nassau.
- Suriname: Grand Cordon of the Honorary Order of the Palm.
