= Evert Gonesh =

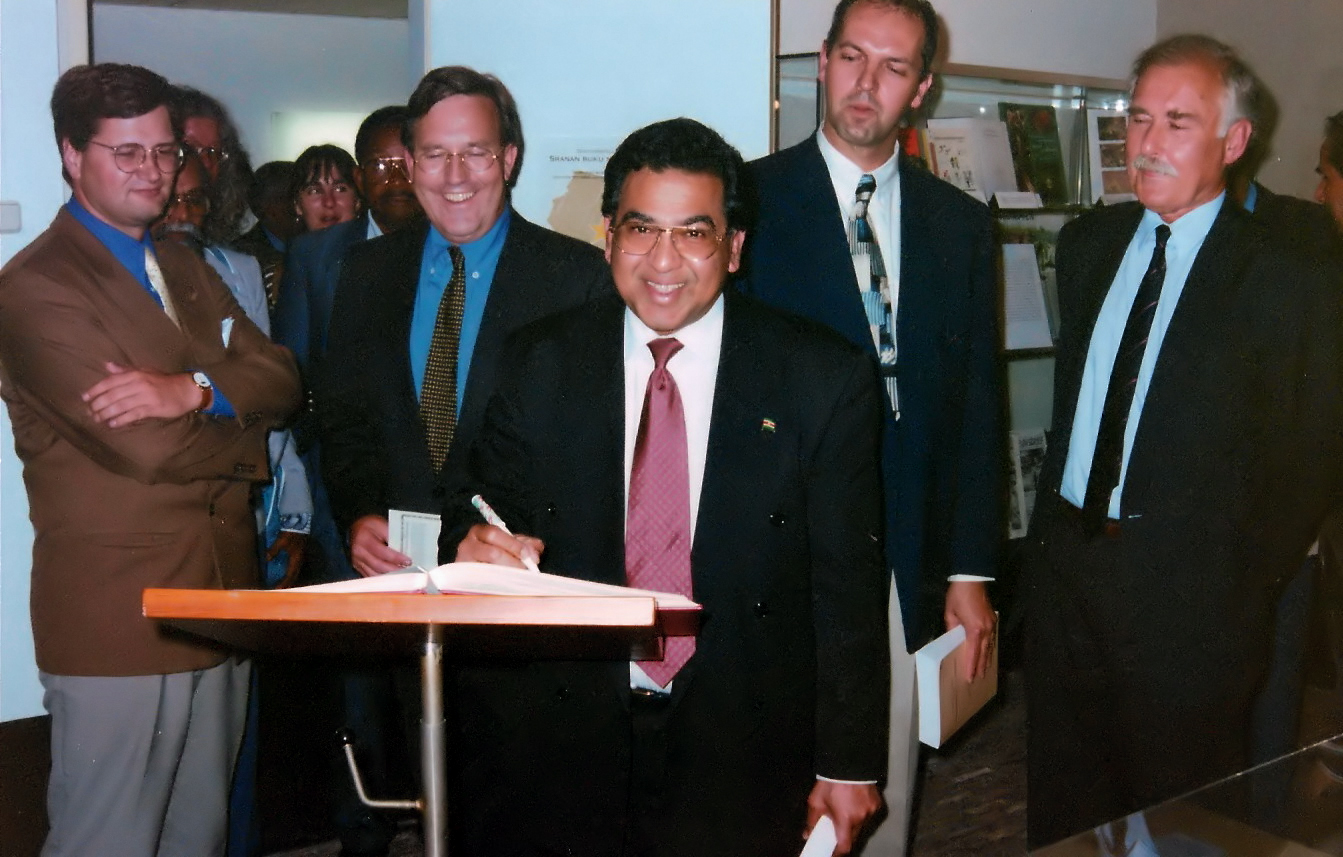
- Evert Gonesh (Behind table/Center of image.)

Ambassador of Suriname to the Netherlands
- In office 1994–2001
- Preceded by: Cyrill Ramkisor
- Succeeded by: Edgar Amanh

Personal details
- Born: Evert Guillaume Azimullah; 27 July 1955 (age 70) Paramaribo, Surinam
- Party: Progressive Reform Party (VHP)

Evert Guillaume Gonesh (formerly known as Evert Guillaume Azimullah; born 21 August 1938) is a Surinamese diplomat, politician, and writer of Indian descent. He served as the Surinamese Ambassador to the Netherlands.

== Biography ==
After completing of his secondary education in Suriname, Gonesh studied Political and Social Sciences at the University of Amsterdam in 1971.

As the Independence of Suriname of 25 November 1975 approached, Evert Gonesh was entrusted with the coordination of the secretariat of the Constitutional Commission (Grondwetscommissie).

In 1983, Gonesh was appointed Dean of the Faculty of Social Sciences of the Anton de Kom University of Suriname. In May 1994, Gonesh was transferred to the Netherlands as Ambassador. He was also accredited as non-resident Ambassador of Suriname for Russia. As the first (non-resident) Surinamese ambassador to the Holy See, he was in 1998 decorated by the pope with the Grand Cross in the Order of Saint Gregory. >

In 2001 Gonesh retired.
