= Merlin Udho =

Guyanese educator and diplomat (born 1953)

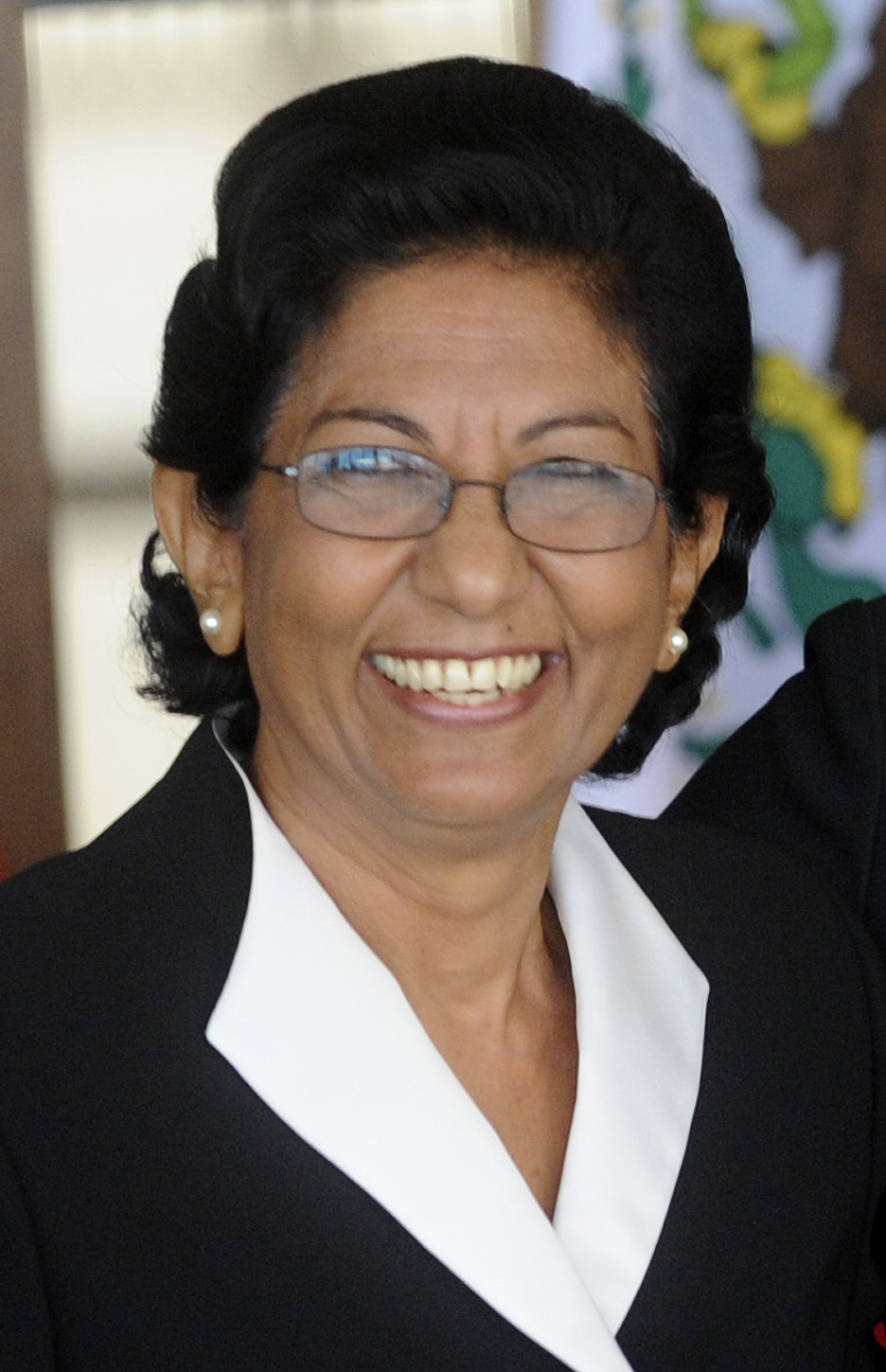
- Udho in 2013

Ambassador of Guyana to Brazil with accreditation as non-resident ambassador to Argentina, Chile, and Paraguay
- In office September 2012 – 2015
- Prime Minister: Sam Hinds
- Preceded by: Kellawan Lall
- Succeeded by: George Talbot

Ambassador of Guyana to the Republic of Suriname
- In office November 2009 – February 2012
- Prime Minister: Sam Hinds
- Preceded by: Karshanjee Arjun

Personal details
- Born: 1953 (age 72–73)
- Education: Peoples' Friendship University (Masters); University of Guyana (PhD)
- Awards: Honorary Order of the Palm

Merlin Udho (born 1953) is a Guyanese educator and diplomat. She has served as Ambassador of Guyana to Argentina, Brazil, Chile, Paraguay and the Republic of Suriname. She has also worked for the United Nations Office for Project Services (UNOPS) in Ukraine (Crimea), Bangladesh and Uganda.

== Early life ==
Udho was born in 1953. Udho graduated with a Master's degree in International Law from the Peoples' Friendship University in Moscow and completed a postgraduate degree in Development Studies at the University of Guyana.

== Career ==
From 1983 to 1986, Udho worked as a lecturer in International Administrative Law at the Anton de Kom University of Suriname. She also worked on the Government's competitiveness strategy.

Udho presented at the World Conference on Women, 1995 in Beijing, China. From 1998 to 2005, she worked as Chief Technical Advisor for the United Nations Office for Project Services (UNOPS) in Ukraine (Crimea), Bangladesh and Uganda.

In 2009, Udho worked as Coordinator of the Guyana Women in Development then as International Secretary and Programme Coordinator for the Women’s Progressive Organisation (WPO). She served as Chair of the Board of the Forest Products Development and Marketing Council of Guyana Inc. (FPDMC) from 2008 to 2009.

Udho served as Ambassador of Guyana to the Republic of Suriname from November 2009 to February 2012, succeeding Karshanjee Arjun. Upon her departure in February 2012, she was awarded the highest civilian order of Suriname, the Grand Cordon of the Honorary Order of the Palm, being credited with helping facilitate the visits of both Presidents to each others countries and supporting the establishment of a regional sports academy in Suriname.

Udho served as Ambassador of Guyana to Brazil with accreditation as non-resident ambassador to Argentina, Chile, and Paraguay from September 2012 to 2015, succeeding Kellawan Lall. In 2016, he was dismissed from office under the Partnership for National Unity/Alliance For Change (APNU/AFC) administration and was succeeded by George Talbot. In 2016, Udho also attended an event about Cheddie Jagan's New Global Human Order (NGHO) at the National Library of Guyana in Georgetown.
