= Demographics of Suriname =

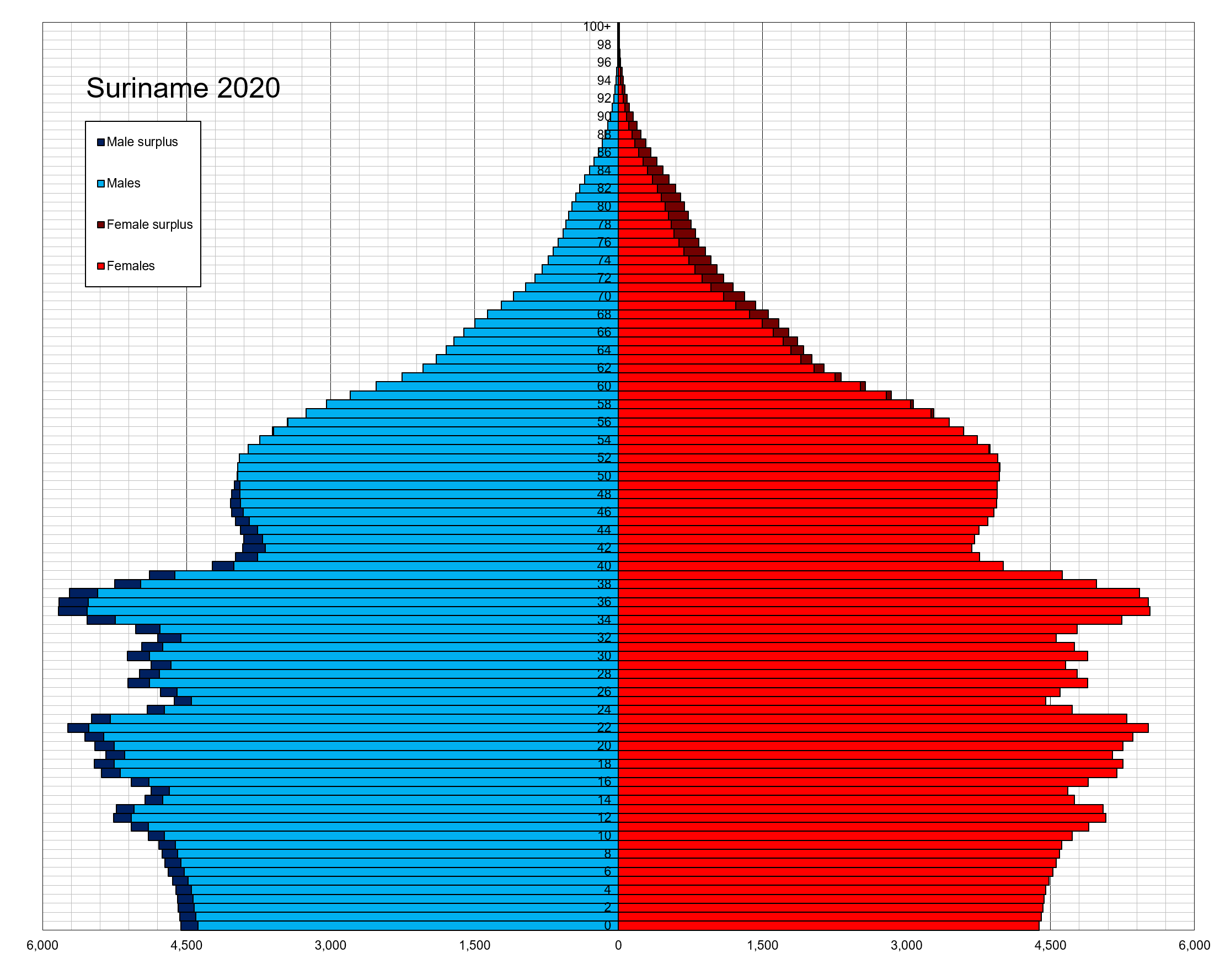
- Population pyramid of Suriname in 2020
- Population: 632,638 (2022 est.)
- Growth rate: 1.13% (2022 est.)
- Birth rate: 15.38 births/1,000 population (2022 est.)
- Death rate: 6.59 deaths/1,000 population (2022 est.)
- Life expectancy: 72.42 years
- Fertility rate: 1.92 children born/woman (2022 est.)
- Infant mortality: 30.25 deaths/1,000 live births
- Net migration rate: 2.54 migrant(s)/1,000 population (2022 est.)
- Immigrant share: 8.2% (2024)

Age structure
- 0–14 years: 23.38%
- 65 and over: 6.55%

Nationality
- Nationality: Surinamese

Language
- Official: Dutch
- Spoken: Sranan Tongo

Census population
Year	Pop.	±% p.a.
1921	107,723	—
1950	198,668	+2.13%
1964	324,211	+3.56%
1972	379,607	+1.99%
1980	354,860	−0.84%
2004	492,464	+1.37%
2012	541,638	+1.20%
2016	558,368	+0.76%
Source: 2016 data

This is a demography of the population of Suriname, including population density, ethnicity, education level, health of the populace, economic status, religious affiliations, and other aspects of the population.

Most Surinamese people live in the narrow, northern coastal plain. The population is one of the most ethnically varied in the world. Each ethnic group preserves its own culture, and many institutions, including political parties, tend to follow ethnic lines. Informal relationships vary: the upper classes of all ethnic backgrounds mix freely; outside of the elite, social relations tend to remain within ethnic groupings. All groups may be found in the schools and workplace.

== Population ==
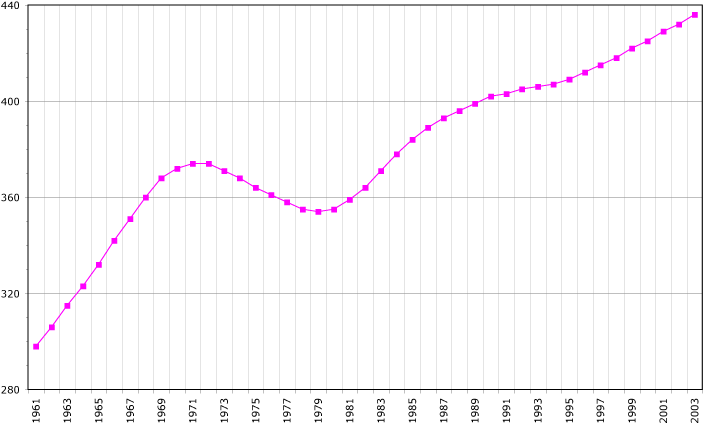
Demographics of Suriname, Data of FAO, year 2005; Number of inhabitants in thousands.

According to the 2022 revision of the World Population Prospects the total population was 612,985 in 2021, compared to only 215,000 in 1950. The proportion of children below the age of 15 in 2010 was 28.6%, 65% was between 15 and 65 years of age, while 6.5% was 65 years or older. According to 2012 census, there were 270,629 males and 271,009 females in Suriname.

Year	Total population ( × 1000)	Proportion (%) aged		
Year	Total population ( × 1000)	0–14	15–64	65+
1950	215	40.0%	54.0%	6.0%
1955	250	43.2%	52.0%	4.8%
1960	290	47.6%	48.3%	4.1%
1965	332	48.2%	47.8%	4.0%
1970	372	48.3%	47.8%	3.9%
1975	364	47.6%	48.5%	3.9%
1980	366	39.9%	55.7%	4.4%
1985	376	35.8%	59.8%	4.5%
1990	407	33.3%	62.0%	4.7%
1995	436	32.2%	62.6%	5.2%
2000	467	30.6%	63.7%	5.7%
2005	500	29.8%	64.1%	6.1%
2010	525	28.6%	65.0%	6.5%

== Total and Percent Distribution of Population by Age (Censuses 2004 & 2012) ==
Age group	2004		2012	
Age group	Number	Percent	Number	Percent
0–14	146.389	29,81	148.767	27.47
15–59	299.547	60.78	334.949	61.84
60+	42.189	8.56	54.527	10.07
Total	492.829	100	541.638	100

=== Structure of the population ===
Population by Sex and Age Group (Census 02.VIII.2004):

Age group	Male	Female	Total	%
Total	248 046	244 783	492 829	100
0–4	26 252	25 585	51 837	10.52
5–9	25 200	24 209	49 409	10.03
10–14	22 889	22 254	45 143	9.16
15–19	23 465	23 043	46 508	9.44
20–24	22 437	21 406	43 843	8.90
25–29	19 006	18 895	37 901	7.69
30–34	19 828	19 166	38 994	7.91
35–39	19 179	18 100	37 279	7.56
40–44	17 657	16 328	33 985	6.90
45–49	12 643	12 992	25 635	5.20
50–54	9 933	10 487	20 420	4.14
55–59	6 955	8 027	14 982	3.04
60–64	6 200	7 059	13 259	2.69
65–69	5 148	5 454	10 602	2.15
70–74	4 103	4 556	8 659	1.76
75–79	2 419	2 733	5 152	1.05
80–84	1 235	1 618	2 853	0.58
85–89	392	677	1 075	0.22
90–94	196	294	490	0.10
95+	34	95	129	0.03
Age group	Male	Female	Total	Percent
0–14	74 341	72 048	146 389	29.70
15–64	157 293	155 489	312 782	63.47
65+	13 527	15 427	28 954	5.88
unknown	2 885	1 819	4 704	0.95

Population Estimates by Sex and Age Group (01.VII.2011):

Age group	Male	Female	Total	%
Total	272 690	267 220	539 910	100
0–4	24 910	24 150	49 060	9.09
5–9	26 400	25 160	51 560	9.55
10–14	25 950	24 850	50 800	9.41
15–19	24 510	23 670	48 180	8.92
20–24	23 270	22 500	45 770	8.48
25–29	22 310	21 360	43 670	8.09
30–34	21 180	20 150	41 330	7.65
35–39	20 130	19 110	39 240	7.27
40–44	18 570	17 720	36 290	6.72
45–49	16 370	15 830	32 200	5.96
50–54	13 940	13 730	27 670	5.12
55–59	10 970	11 200	22 170	4.11
60–64	8 340	8 890	17 230	3.19
65–69	6 200	6 870	13 070	2.42
70–74	4 360	5 060	9 420	1.74
75–79	2 860	3 500	6 360	1.18
80+	2 420	3 470	5 890	1.09
Age group	Male	Female	Total	Percent
0–14	77 260	72 048	149 308	27.65
15–64	179 590	176 272	355 862	65.91
65+	15 840	18 900	34 740	6.43

Population by Sex and Age Group (Census 13.VIII.2012):

Age group	Male	Female	Total	%
Total	270 629	271 009	541 638	100
0–4	25 968	24 580	50 548	9.33
5–9	24 549	23 186	47 735	8.81
10–14	26 166	24 318	50 484	9.32
15–19	22 772	22 336	45 108	8.33
20–24	21 656	22 106	43 762	8.08
25–29	21 761	22 185	43 946	8.11
30–34	19 355	19 696	39 051	7.21
35–39	18 316	18 113	36 429	6.73
40–44	18 763	18 620	37 383	6.90
45–49	18 083	17 948	36 031	6.65
50–54	15 313	15 338	30 651	5.66
55–59	10 929	11 659	22 588	4.17
60–64	7 734	8 763	16 497	3.05
65–69	5 951	7 057	13 008	2.40
70–74	4 619	5 514	10 133	1.87
75–79	3 393	4 163	7 556	1.40
80–84	1 934	2 499	4 433	0.82
85–89	743	1 235	1 978	0.37
90–94	274	438	712	0.13
95+	64	146	210	0.04
Age group	Male	Female	Total	Percent
0–14	76 683	72 084	148 767	27.47
15–64	176 968	177 873	354 841	65.51
65+	16 978	21 052	38 030	7.02
unknown	2 286	1 109	3 395	0.63

Population Estimates by Sex and Age Group (01.VII.2020):

Age group	Male	Female	Total	%
Total	300 500	302 000	602 500	100
0–4	27 500	26 700	54 200	9.00
5–9	26 500	25 300	51 800	8.60
10–14	25 500	23 900	49 400	8.20
15–19	25 000	23 500	48 500	8.05
20–24	24 100	23 300	47 400	7.87
25–29	23 300	22 800	46 100	7.65
30–34	22 200	22 200	44 400	7.37
35–39	21 100	21 200	42 300	7.02
40–44	19 900	20 000	39 900	6.62
45–49	18 800	18 900	37 700	6.26
50–54	17 400	17 600	35 000	5.81
55–59	14 800	15 500	30 300	5.03
60–64	12 100	13 200	25 300	4.20
65–69	8 800	10 300	19 100	3.17
70–74	6 000	7 500	13 500	2.24
75–79	3 900	5 100	9 000	1.49
80+	3 600	5 000	8 600	1.43
Age group	Male	Female	Total	Percent
0–14	79 500	75 900	155 400	25.79
15–64	198 700	198 200	396 900	65.88
65+	22 300	27 900	50 200	8.33

== Vital statistics ==
=== UN estimates ===
The Population Departement of the United Nations prepared the following estimates for Suriname.

Period	Live births per year	Deaths per year	Natural change per year	CBR*	CDR*	NC*	TFR*	IMR*	Life expectancy		
Period	Live births per year	Deaths per year	Natural change per year	CBR*	CDR*	NC*	TFR*	IMR*	total	males	females
1950–1955	10 000	3 000	7 000	48.0	14.9	33.1	6.56	89	56.0	54.4	57.7
1955–1960	12 000	3 000	9 000	46.0	12.4	33.6	6.56	76	58.7	57.0	60.5
1960–1965	14 000	3 000	11 000	44.8	10.6	34.2	6.56	64	60.5	58.7	62.5
1965–1970	14 000	3 000	11 000	39.7	9.0	30.6	5.95	55	62.4	60.5	64.5
1970–1975	13 000	3 000	10 000	34.9	8.3	26.6	5.29	49	64.0	61.7	66.5
1975–1980	11 000	3 000	8 000	30.2	7.4	22.8	4.20	44	65.1	62.8	67.7
1980–1985	11 000	3 000	8 000	30.0	7.3	22.7	3.70	42	66.5	63.6	69.8
1985–1990	10 000	3 000	7 000	25.4	7.2	18.2	3.00	39	67.1	64.0	70.7
1990–1995	9 000	3 000	6 000	22.5	7.1	15.4	2.60	34	67.6	64.4	71.1
1995–2000	11 000	3 000	8 000	23.6	7.4	16.2	2.80	29	67.8	64.6	71.4
2000–2005	10 000	4 000	6 000	21.0	7.6	13.4	2.60	24	68.1	64.8	71.7
2005–2010	10 000	4 000	6 000	19.1	7.3	11.9	2.42	22	69.6	66.4	73.1

* CBR = crude birth rate (per 1000); CDR = crude death rate (per 1000); NC = natural change (per 1000); IMR = infant mortality rate per 1000 births; TFR = total fertility rate (number of children per woman)

=== Registered births and deaths ===
Births and deaths
Year	Population	Live births	Deaths	Natural increase	Crude birth rate	Crude death rate	Rate of natural increase	Crude migration	TFR
1932		4,186	1,853	2,333					
1933		4,532	1,853	2,679					
1934		4,474	1,835	2,639					
1935		4,806	1,754	3,052					
1936		4,536	1,916	2,620					
1937		4,524	1,854	2,670					
1938		4,514	1,916	2,598					
1939		4,740	1,876	2,864					
1940		5,224	2,036	3,188					
1941		5,140	1,928	3,212					
1942		5,159	2,148	3,011					
1943		5,145	2,480	2,665					
1944		5,346	2,467	2,879					
1945		6,213	1,965	4,248					
1946		6,098	2,026	4,072					
1947		5,983	2,338	3,645					
1948		6,476	2,217	4,259					
1949		6,473	2,243	4,230					
1950		6,863	1,974	4,889					
1951		7,710	1,965	5,745					
1952		8,453	1,917	6,536					
1953		8,878	2,159	6,719					
1954		9,154	1,919	7,235					
1955		9,458	1,989	7,469					
1956		10,177	2,131	8,040					
1957		10,001	2,274	7,727					
1958		11,151	1,942	9,209					
1959		11,757	2,055	9,702					
1960		11,702	2,144	9,558					
1961		12,835	2,310	10,525					
1962		13,141	2,412	10,729					
1963			2,406						
1964			2,292						
1965		13,253	2,378	10,875					
1966		12,925	2,280	10,645					
1967									
1968									
1969									
1970									
1971			2,540						
1972		12,557							
1973		11,881							
1974		11,809							
1975		10,031							
1976		11,176							
1977		11,099							
1978		10,673							
1979		10,586							
1980	355,240	9,848							
1981	360,021	10,094							
1982	364,854	11,205	2,377	8,828					
1983	369,752	11,823							
1984	374,716	11,501							
1985	379,746	11,704	2,275	9,429					
1986	384,844	10,176							
1987	390,011	9,660							
1988	395,246	9,094							
1989	400,552	10,217	2,717	7,500	25.5	6.8	18.7	−5.5	
1990	405,930	9,545	2,792	6,753	23.5	6.9	16.6	−3.4	
1991	411,397	9,104	2,573	6,531	22.1	6.3	15.9	−2.6	
1992	416,902	9,835	2,717	7,118	23.6	6.5	17.1	−3.9	
1993	422,498	9,398	2,998	6,400	22.2	7.1	15.1	−1.9	
1994	428,170	8,418	2,842	5,576	19.7	6.6	13.0	0.2	
1995	433,918	8,717	2,696	6,021	20.1	6.2	13.9	−0.6	
1996	439,743	9,393	2,894	6,499	21.4	6.6	14.8	−1.5	
1997	445,647	10,794	2,878	7,916	24.2	6.5	17.8	−4.5	
1998	451,629	10,221	2,814	7,407	22.6	6.2	16.4	−3.2	
1999	457,692	10,144	2,992	7,152	22.2	6.5	15.6	−2.4	
2000	463,837	9,804	3,090	6,714	21.1	6.7	14.5	−1.2	
2001	470,064	9,717	3,099	6,618	20.7	6.6	14.1	−0.8	
2002	476,374	10,188	3,125	7,063	21.4	6.6	14.8	−1.6	
2003	481,146	9,634	3,154	6,480	20.0	6.6	13.4	−3.5	
2004	492,829	9,062	3,319	5,743	18.6	6.8	11.8	12.1	
2005	498,543	8,657	3,392	5,265	17.4	6.8	10.6	0.9	2.147
2006	504,257	9,311	3,197	6,114	18.5	6.4	12.1	−0.8	2.285
2007	509,970	9,769	3,374	6,395	19.2	6.6	12.6	−1.3	2.387
2008	517,052	10,097	3,357	6,740	19.5	6.5	13.0	0.7	2.446
2009	524,143	9,792	3,293	6,499	18.7	6.3	12.4	1.1	2.325
2010	531,170	9,712	3,484	6,228	18.3	6.6	11.7	1.5	2.302
2011	539,910	9,703	3,441	6,262	18.0	6.4	11.6	4.6	2.270
2012	541,638	10,217	3,687	6,530	18.9	6.8	12.1	−8.9	2.408
2013	550,222	10,012	3,557	6,455	18.2	6.5	11.7	3.9	2.320
2014	558,773	10,407	3,738	6,669	18.6	6.7	11.9	3.4	2.395
2015	567,300	10,148	3,663	6,485	17.9	6.5	11.4	3.6	2.312
2016	575,700	9,910	3,591	6,319	17.2	6.2	11.0	3.6	2.241
2017	583,200	9,785	3,508	6,277	16.8	6.0	10.8	2.1	2.191
2018	590,100	9,809	3,763	6,046	16.6	6.4	10.2	1.4	2.185
2019	598,000	10,127	3,955	6,172	16.9	6.6	10.3	2.9	2.245
2020	608,900	10,053	3,971	6,082	16.5	6.5	10.0	7.9	2.202
2021	616,500	10,252	5,535	4,717	16.6	9.0	7.6	4.7	2.228
2022	624,900	9,254	4,641	4,613	14.8	7.4	7.4	6.1	2.001
2023	633,400	8,926	4,423	4,503	14.1	7.0	7.1	6.3	
2024	639,000	8,273	4,322	3,951	13.0	6.8	6.1	2.6	

== Ethnic groups ==
Population of Suriname according to ethnic group
Ethnic group	Census 1921		Census 1950		Census 1964		Census 1972		Census 1980		Census 2004		Census 2012	
Ethnic group	Number	%	Number	%	Number	%	Number	%	Number	%	Number	%	Number	%
East Indian			62,280	31.3	112,633	34.7	142,917	37.6			135,117	27.4	148,443	27.4
Maroons			19,180	9.7	27,698	8.5	35,838	9.4			72,553	14.7	117,567	21.7
Creole			71,657	36.1	114,961	35.5	119,009	31.4			87,202	17.7	84,933	15.7
Javanese			35,270	17.8	48,463	14.9	57,688	15.2			71,879	14.6	73,975	13.7
Mixed			0	0.0	0	0.0	0	0.0			61,524	12.5	72,340	13.4
Amerindian			–	–	7,287	2.2	–	–			18,037	3.7	20,344	3.8
Chinese			–	–	5,339	1.6	–	–			8,775	1.8	7,885	1.5
White			–	–	4,322	1.3	–	–			2,899	0.6	1,667	0.3
Other			10,095	5.1	2,986	0.9	24,155	6.4			2,264	0.5	7,166	1.3
Unknown			186	0.1	522	0.2	0	0.0			1,261	0.3	1,805	0.3
No answer											31,318	6.4	1,590	0.3
Total	107,723		198,668		324,211		379,607		355,240		492,829		541,638	

Ethnic groups of Suriname
Ethnic groups	percent
East Indian	27.4%
Maroon	21.7%
Creole	15.7%
Javanese	14%
Mixed	13.4%
Amerindian	3.8%
Chinese	1.5%
White	0.3%
Other	2.5%

- The census used self-identification for ethnic classification.
- Amerindians are the original inhabitants of Suriname.
- East Indians, also known locally as Hindustanis, are those whose ancestors emigrated from northern British India in the latter part of the 19th century.
- Creoles are descendants from slaves from Africa. Prior to the 2004 census, mixed-race people were counted as Creoles. Their ancestors were brought to the country in the 17th and 18th centuries.
- The Maroons are descendants from slaves from Africa that escaped to the interior of Suriname. Their proportion has increased considerably during the past decades, from 9% in 1964 to 22% in 2012.
- The Javanese are Asians from formerly Dutch-ruled Indonesia.
- Many Whites are descended from Dutch colonists.

The current population of Suriname will be different to these census figures, as the census records residents, and notes legal visitors, but does not record illegal immigrants. According to estimates there may be as many as:

- 60,000 Brazilians (estimates varies between 20,000 and 80,000) from Brazil. There are also other smaller numbers of South American nationalities.
- 40,000 Chinese, with small communities of Koreans, Japanese and Filipinos.
- 2,000 Arab/Middle Eastern (mostly Christian Lebanese but also Christians from Syria and Palestine).
- 200 Jews who are identified in ethnoreligious terms.
- Suriname has large American expatriate (mostly retiree) communities (about 50,000 Americans live in Suriname).
- Also living in Suriname are Dutch citizens, some of which with a Surinamese background.

=== Fertility rate by ethnic group ===
The total fertility rate for Suriname as a whole was 2.53 children per woman aged 15 to 49 in 2012. Maroons had the highest fertility rate, with 4.47 children per woman. On the other hand, Indo-Surinamese had the lowest fertility with 1.78 children per woman.

Total fertility rate by ethnic group in 2012
Ethnic group	Total fertility rate	Children ever born
Maroons	4.47	5.79
Creole	2.26	3.06
East-Indian	1.78	3.15
Javanese	2.15	3.17
Mixed people	2.12	2.77
Smaller minorities	2.93	3.46
Unknown (mostly Maroons as well)	3.69	4.91
Suriname (as whole)	2.53	3.48

== Languages ==
Sranan Tongo, a local English-based creole language, is the most widely used vernacular language in daily life and business among the Surinamese. It is spoken by more than 80% of the population as first or second language. Together with Dutch, it is considered to be one of the two principal languages of Surinamese diglossia.

Dutch is the official language of Suriname and the mother tongue of around 60% of the population. Sranan Tongo is the lingua franca and second most spoken language of Suriname.

English is mostly used in the business sector mainly to communicate with foreign businesses. It is also used in the hospitality industry to communicate with tourists.

Sarnami Hindustani is spoken by the Surinamese Indian community. Depending on the person this language can be either the mother tongue, second language or third language (after Dutch or Sranan Tongo).

Saramaccan is spoken by the Saramaka tribe of the Maroon community. Aukan is mainly spoken by the Aukan tribe of the Maroon community

Javanese is spoken by the Surinamese Javanese community. Just like Sarnami Hindustani, Javanese can be either the mother tongue, second language or third language (after Dutch or Sranan Tongo) for some.

Hakka and Cantonese is spoken by Surinamese Chinese, mainly as a second language after Dutch. Cantonese was introduced in Suriname by the second wave of Chinese immigrants in 1970. Beginning in the 1990s new migrants from China moved to Suriname, and Putonghua, during circa 2004–2014, became the main Chinese lingua franca in the country.

French is spoken by some Maroons due to the cultural influence from French Guiana, Portuguese mainly by immigrants from Brazil and Portugal, and Spanish due to immigrants from, Cuba, Venezuela, Colombia, and other Latin American countries.

Amerindian languages are spoken by the Surinamese Amerindian community. Languages include Carib, Arawak, Tiriyó and Wayana.

== Religion ==
Denomination	2012 census	
Denomination	#	%
Catholic Church	117,261	21.6%
Pentecostalism (Full Gospel)	60,530	11.18%
Moravian Church	60,420	11.16%
Jehovah's Witnesses	6,622	1.2%
Calvinism	4,018	0.7%
Lutheranism	2,811	0.5%
Other forms of Christianity	17,280	3.2%
Sanatani Hindus	97,311	18%
Arya Samaj Hindus	16,661	3.1%
Other forms of Hinduism	6,651	1.2%
Sunni Islam	21,159	3.9%
Ahmadi Islam	14,161	2.6%
Other forms of Islam	39,733	7.3%
Javanism	4,460	0.8%
Judaism	181	0.0%
Winti	9,949	1.8%
Other faith	4,630	0.9%
No faith	40,718	7.5%
No answer	17,082	3.2%
Total population	541,638	100.0%
