= White Surinamese =

Witte Surinamers (Dutch)

Regions with significant populations
- Paramaribo

Languages
- Dutch

White Surinamese or European Surinamese are Surinamese people whose ancestry lies within the continent of Europe.

As of 2012, people of solely European descent are a small minority in Suriname, accounting for only 1,667 people or 0.3% of the country's population. The largest European ethnic groups in Suriname are the Dutch and the Portuguese.

== History ==
Spaniards from Spain were the initial Europeans to conduct expeditions throughout the Suriname region. During 1499, Spanish expeditions led by Amerigo Vespucci and Alonso de Ojeda traversed the Suriname area, followed by Vicente Yáñez Pinzón’s expedition in 1500. Before the arrival of Europeans, Suriname was home to many Indigenous tribes such as Arawaks, Caribs, Kalina people and Warao people. Christopher Columbus inaugurated the presence in the region of Europeans, who enslaved the indigenous people. Subsequently, the Spanish, British, Dutch, and French attempted to establish their presence but were unsuccessful until the 1650s. Plantation owners from Barbados arrived with enslaved individuals to cultivate Suriname. The settlement flourished to such an extent that it attracted further European interest, leading to conflicts between the Dutch and the British over territorial claims. Following the conclusion of the second Anglo-Dutch War, the British ceded Suriname to the Dutch in 1677. Diseases such as influenza and tuberculosis, brought by the Europeans, wiped out much of the indigenous population. European colonists introduced black slaves from Africa to Suriname following the decimation of the indigenous population by the Spaniards. Widespread sexual violence, rape and exploitation against both enslaved African slaves and Native American women was a foundational element of colonial control in Suriname under European rule. White men often raped Black women and Indigenous women.

== See also ==
- Dutch Surinamese
- Portuguese Surinamese
- History of the Jews in Suriname
