= Rajendre Khargi =

Surinamese Journalist

His Excellency Rajendre Khargi
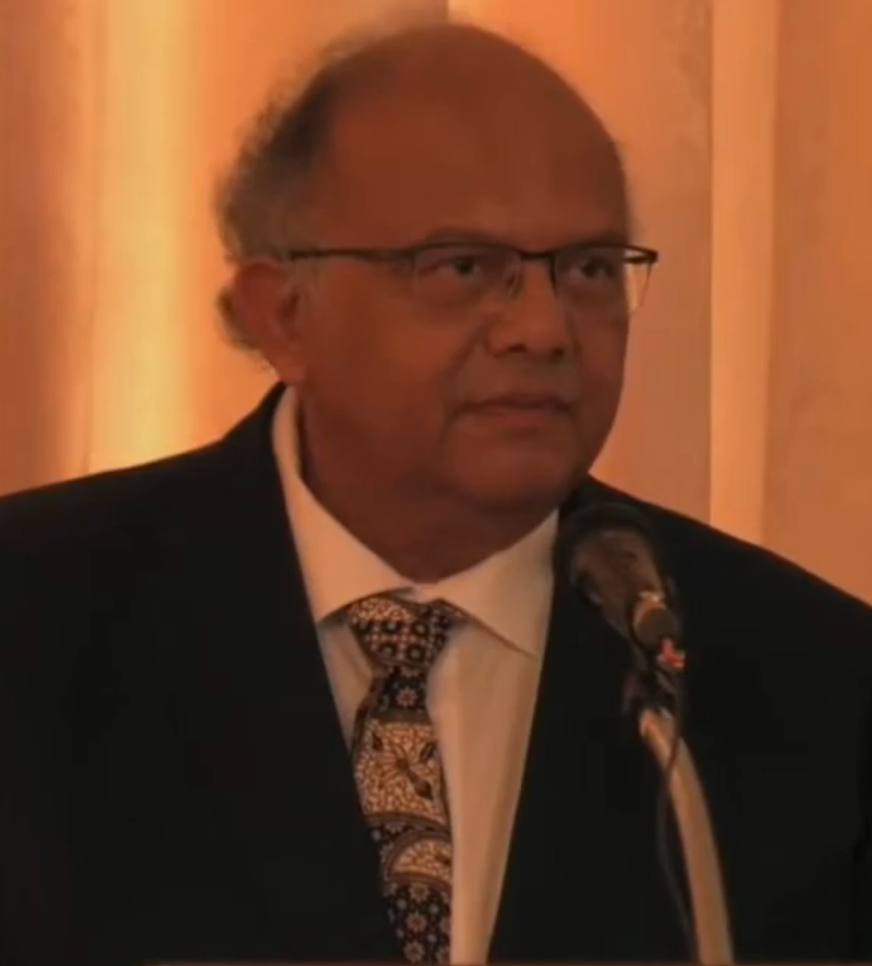
- Rajendre Khargi (2020)

Ambassador of Suriname to the Netherlands
- Incumbent
- Assumed office 10 February 2021
- Preceded by: Urmila Joella-Sewnundun (2006–2010)

Personal details
- Born: 27 July 1955 (age 70) Paramaribo, Surinam
- Party: Progressive Reform Party (VHP)

Rajendre Khargi (27 July 1955) is a Surinamese journalist and diplomat. He has worked for the Nederlandse Omroep Stichting and Algemeen Nederlands Persbureau among others. He was an advisor and speechwriter for Chan Santokhi. Since 10 February 2021, he serves as Ambassador of Suriname to the Netherlands.

== Biography ==
Khargi was born on 27 July 1955 in Paramaribo. In 1974, he started to work as a radio reporter for the Nederlandse Omroep Stichting. He was the editor of Het Zwarte Schaap, a radio program for Surinamese and Antilleans on Radio 2. In 1984, he became editor in chief for the Algemeen Nederlands Persbureau in Aruba and the Netherlands Antilles. In 2002, he became advisor for the Dutch Minister for Foreign Trade and Development Cooperation. In 2005, he became chairperson of OneWorld.

Khargi was advisor and speechwriter for Chan Santokhi since 2013. Originally, he had a Dutch nationality. In 2020, he changed to a Surinamese citizenship. The last ambassador to the Netherlands was Urmila Joella-Sewnundun who served until 2010. President Bouterse did not install new ambassadors, and only appointed chargé d'affaires. In November 2020, Khargi was nominated as Ambassador of Suriname to the Netherlands, and was installed on 10 February 2021.

== Honours ==
- Knight of the Order of Orange-Nassau.
