= Biblionef =

Book donation non-profit organisation

Biblionef International
- Formation: 1989
- Type: Book donation organisation
- Location: Pinelands, Cape Town
- Coordinates: 33.56222°S 18.29539°E
- Region served: South Africa, Belgium, Surinam, Netherlands, France, Flanders, Ghana, Dutch Caribbean
- Official language: English and French
- Staff: 9
- Website: www.biblionef.nl/organisatie/zusterorganisaties/

Biblionef is a book donation non-profit organisation based in several countries: Netherlands, South Africa, France, Dutch Caribbean, Flanders, Suriname and Ghana. Biblionef donates new storybooks to under-privileged children and adolescents. The organisation donates books to institutions like schools, day care centres, crèches and other organisations with an educational focus in informal settlements and rural areas.

== Background ==
Jonkheer Mr.Maximilien Vegelin van Claerbergen, a former Dutch ambassador, initiated Biblionef in 1989 in France. The name Biblionef derives from "biblio" referring to books and "nef" referring to a ship. The organisation's stated objective is to provide children in disadvantaged areas of the world with new storybooks.

== Biblionef SA ==
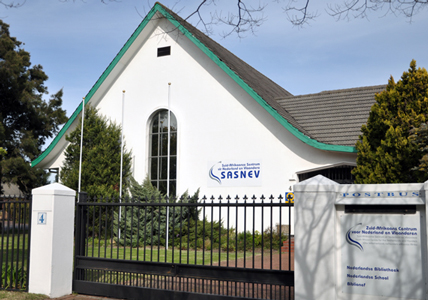
Biblionef's offices – SASNEV Building

Biblionef SA is part of an international network of 6 independent non-profit organisations. Due to South Africa's education and literacy problems, a Biblionef depot was opened in the SASNEV Building (4 Central Square, Pinelands, Cape Town) in August 1998. Executive Director, Jean Williams, established Biblionef SA under the auspices of Biblionef's founder, Vegelin van Claerbergen.

The office houses a book stock covering stories in all eleven official languages of South Africa. Biblionef SA operates as an independent, non-profit organization. It is responsible for obtaining and distributing the new storybooks to underprivileged children in South Africa. The cost of the books, shipping, warehousing, and administration is covered by funds from foundations, corporations and individuals.

== Biblionef Netherlands ==
The Dutch Biblionef coordinates also Biblionef Ghana, Biblionef Dutch Caribbean and is supportive to Biblionef Suriname and Biblionef South Africa which it also founded. It operates from The Hague. Among the board members are Rein van Charldorp (Chair and managing director of OCLC) and Bjorn Stenvers.

== Biblionef France ==
Is the first Biblionef and was founded in 1989. It operates from Paris and supports all French-speaking countries.

== Biblionef Belgium ==
They have an office in Flanders.

Biblionef differs from many other book donation organisations in 2 key areas:

- Biblionef donates new children storybooks in all the official languages (e.g. the 7 of South Africa).
- Due to the shortage of mother-tongue publications, the organisation works with local publishers and writers to commission the printing of children's books in the African languages.

== Results ==
- Supported 21 schools for the visually impaired with braille and large print books

== Awards and recognition ==
- Western Cape Government's Promotion of Marginalised Indigenous Languages Awards – February 2014
