= Honorary Order of the Palm =

Honorary Order of the Palm Ere-Orde van de Palm
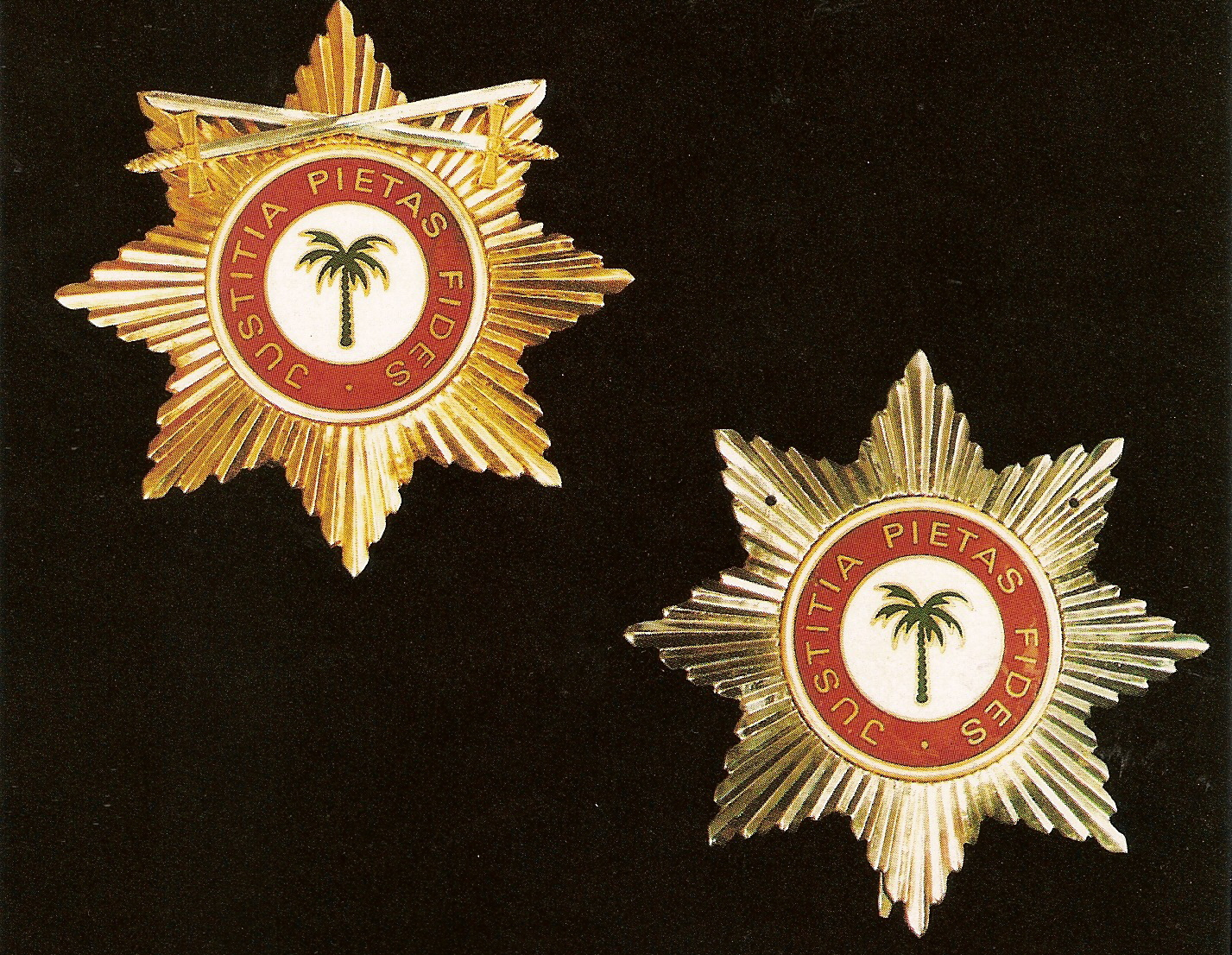
- Star of the order, military (left) and civil version (right)

Awarded by Republic of Suriname
- Type: Order with two divisions, five classes, and two medals
- Established: 25 November 1975
- Motto: JUSTITIA PIETAS FIDES (Justice Piety Fidelity)
- Eligibility: Surinamese civilians and military, distinguished foreign persons
- Awarded for: special merits in the civilian or military area
- Status: Currently constituted
- Grand Master: HE Dr. Jennifer Geerlings-Simons
- Grades: Grand Cordon; Grand Officer; Commander; Officer; Knight

Precedence
- Next (higher): Honorary Order of the Yellow Star
- Next (lower): —
- Ribbon bar of the order

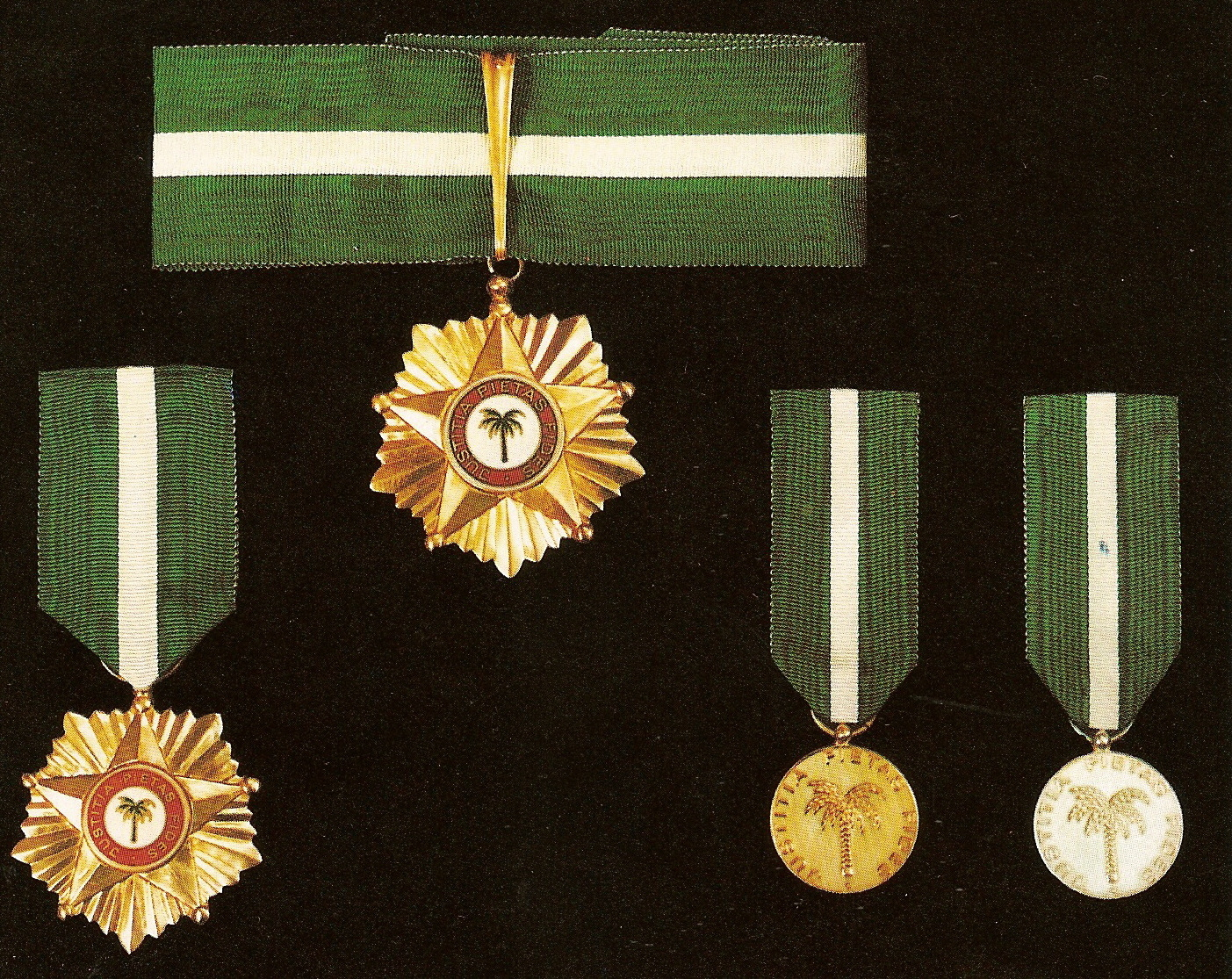
Honorary Order of the Palm and Honorary Medals in Gold and Silver

The Honorary Order of the Palm (Dutch: Ere-Orde van de Palm) is a military and civil state decoration of the Republic of Suriname. The Order was instituted in 1975 at the independence of Suriname and replaced the Dutch Order of Orange-Nassau. It is awarded to individuals for special service in the civil or military field. Foreigners are also eligible for this order. The president of Suriname is the Grand Master of the order.

== Classes ==
The Honorary Order of the Palm has two divisions, civil and military, the latter denoted by crossed swords on both the badge and the star.

The following five Classes exist, plus two medals:

Classes of the Order
Name of class		Where the badge is worn
English	Dutch	Where the badge is worn
Grand Cordon	Grootlint	On a sash on the right shoulder, plus the star on the left side of the chest
Grand Officer	Grootofficier	On a necklet, plus a star on the left side of the chest
Commander	Commandeur	On a necklet
Officer	Officier	On a ribbon with rosette on the left side of the chest
Knight	Ridder	On a ribbon on the left side of the chest.

There are also Honorary Medals in Gold and Silver, worn on a ribbon on the left chest.

== Insignia ==
The Badge of the order exists of a gold gilt five-pointed star topped with a small balls, and gold gilt rays between the arms, resulting in a badge with the shape of a pentagon. The central disk shows the green palm of the Coat of arms of Suriname on white enamel, surrounded by a red enamel and gold edged ring displaying the motto in yellow (also from the Surinamese Coat of arms): JUSTITIA - PIETAS - FIDES ("Justice - Piety - Faith"). The military division has crossed swords placed on the badge.

The Star of the Order is an eight-pointed gold gilt star with straight rays. The central disc is the same as that of the badge. The military division has crossed swords on the star.

The Medal is round, with a gold or silver version. It shows the stylized palm surrounded by a circlet with the motto of the order.

The Ribbon of the order is green with a central white stripe.

== Recipients ==
=== Grand Cordons ===
- Theo Bot
- Hendricus Leopold - First Dutch ambassador.
- Antoine Joly - French ambassador.
- Pierre Lardinois
- Jan Pronk - a Dutch politician and UN diplomat
- Fons van der Stee
- Max van der Stoel - a Dutch politician, Minister of Foreign Affairs of the Netherlands, and High Commissioner of the OSCE
- Mia Mottley - Prime Minister of Barbados
- Merlin Udho - Ambassador

=== Other Classes ===
- Barryl Biekman - a Surinamese-born Dutch politician and activist
- Gaius de Gaay Fortman
- Roelof Nelissen
- Joop den Uyl - a Dutch politician and Prime Minister of the Netherlands
- Joris Voorhoeve
- Humbert Willems - a Surinamese activist
- Leendert M. de Jong - Dag vd REP Parachute PL/RD/C 11/24/2015 http://ere-onderscheidingen.gov.sr/
- Bisnoepersad Doerga - Dag vd REP Parachute PL/RD/C 11/24/2015 http://ere-onderscheidingen.gov.sr/
- Bas Driessen - Dag vd REP Parachute PL/RD/C 11/24/2015 http://ere-onderscheidingen.gov.sr/
- Roelof Kamman - Dag vd REP Parachute PL/RD/C 11/24/2015 http://ere-onderscheidingen.gov.sr/
- Timothy Porter - Dag vd REP Parachute PL/RD/C 11/24/2015 http://ere-onderscheidingen.gov.sr/
- Aart Soeteman - Dag vd REP Parachute PL/RD/C 11/24/2015 http://ere-onderscheidingen.gov.sr/
- Leendert A. van der Snel - Dag vd REP Parachute PL/RD/C 11/24/2015 http://ere-onderscheidingen.gov.sr/
- Jan van Sinderen - Dag vd REP Parachute PL/RD/C 11/24/2015 http://ere-onderscheidingen.gov.sr/
- Katidjah Kasanoemar Paimo - a Javanese Surinamese herbalist
