= Henk van der Zwan =

Dutch diplomat (born 1956)

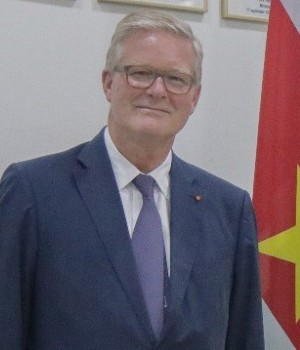
- Van der Zwan (2021)

Ambassador of the Netherlands to Suriname
- Incumbent
- Assumed office 10 February 2021
- Preceded by: Aart Jacobi (2009–2012)

Ambassador of the Netherlands to Canada
- In office 2016–2020

Ambassador of the Netherlands to Estonia
- In office 2006–2010

Personal details
- Born: Henk Ary Christiaan van der Zwan; 20 May 1956 (age 69) Leeuwarden, Netherlands

Henk Ary Christiaan van der Zwan (born 20 May 1956) is a Dutch diplomat. He served as ambassador of the Netherlands to Estonia (2006–2010), Canada (2016–2020), and since 2021, Suriname.

== Biography ==
Van der Zwan was born on 20 May 1956 in Leeuwarden. In 1975, he graduated from the European School in Luxembourg, and continued his studies at Leiden University where he graduated in 1984. He started to work for the Minister of Foreign Affairs of the Netherlands.

Between 2002 and 2006, van der Zwan was general secretary of Queen Beatrix. In 2006, he was appointed Ambassador of the Netherlands to Estonia, and served until 2010. Between 2016 and 2020, van der Zwan served as ambassador to Canada.

In April 2012, Aart Jacobi, the Dutch ambassador for Suriname, was recalled after the Bouterse government passed an amnesty law for the December murders. Diplomatic affairs were handled by chargé d'affaires. In 2020, van der Zwan was nominated as Ambassador of Suriname to the Netherlands, and was installed on 10 February 2021. Van der Zwan also serves as non-resident ambassador to Guyana as of 7 December 2020.

== Honours ==
- Honorary Cross of the Order of the House of Orange.
