= Maximilien Vegelin van Claerbergen =

Dutch diplomat

Jonkheer Mr. Maximilien Vegelin van Claerbergen (17 August 1927 – 11 April 2011) was a Dutch diplomat and founder of Biblionef International.

Van Claerbergen was born on 17 August 1927 in Roquebrune-Cap-Martin, France. On 8 December 1978, he was appointed Ambassador of the Netherlands to Suriname. On 24 February 1980, one day before the 1980 Surinamese coup d'état, he boarded a plane to French Guiana. On 5 October 1981, he was succeeded by Joop Hoekman.

He died on 11 April 2011 in Zeist.

== Honours ==
- Portugal: Grand Cross of the Order of Merit (14 May 1991)

== Sources ==
- Nederland's Adelsboek; 96 (2011), pp. 74–75.
