= Cyrill Ramkisor =

Surinamese politician (1933–2025)

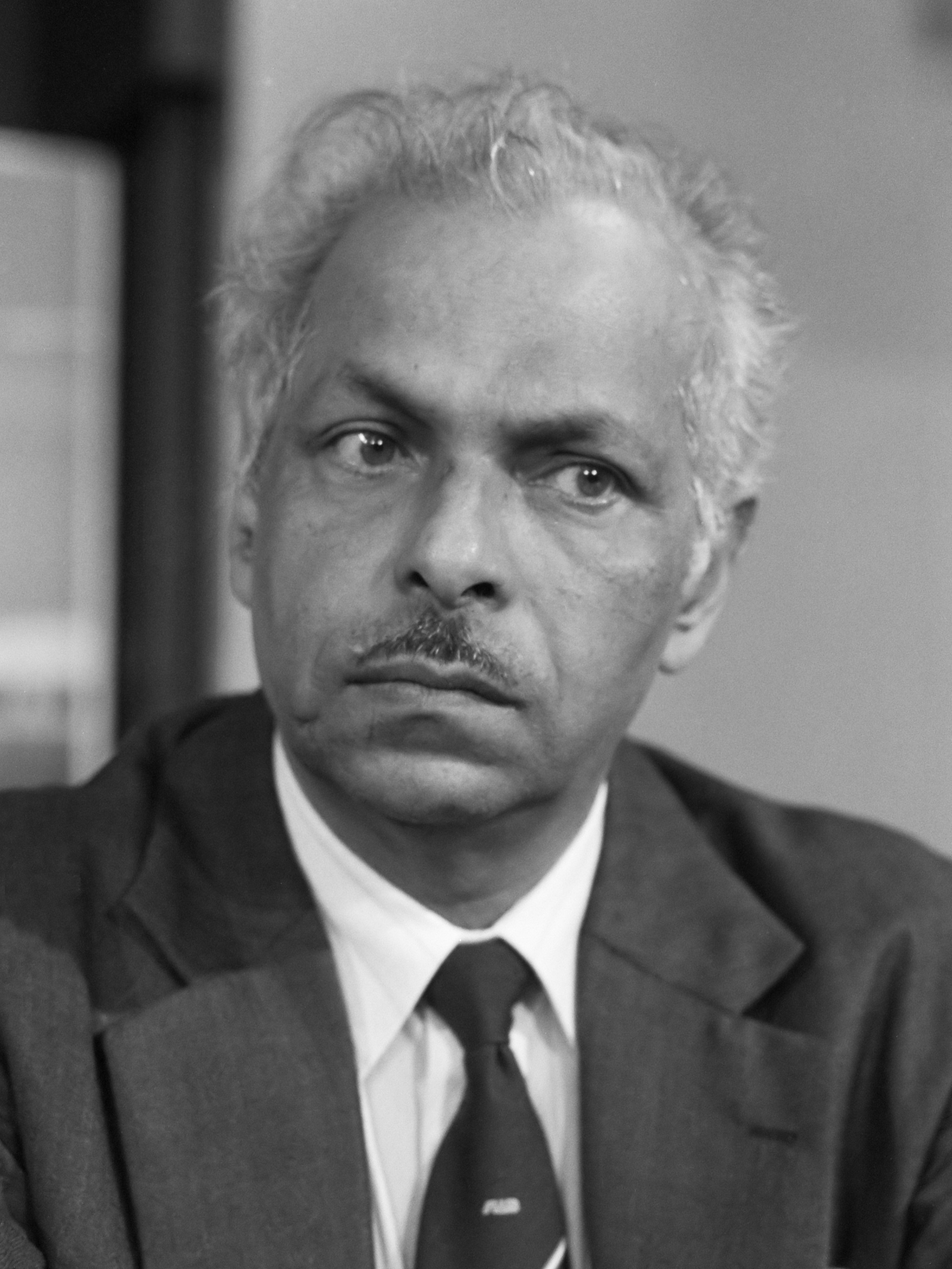
- Ramkisor in 1988

Minister of Public Works
- In office 1985–1986
- Preceded by: Jainul Abdul
- Succeeded by: Wilhelm Wolfram

Minister of District Governance and Decentralization
- In office 1970–1973
- Preceded by: position established
- Succeeded by: Olton van Genderen

Personal details
- Born: Cyrill Bisoendat Ramkisor; 19 November 1933
- Died: 24 March 2025 (aged 91); Paramaribo, Suriname
- Political party: VHP
- Education: Delft University of Technology
- Occupation: Diplomat

Cyrill Bisoendat Ramkisor (19 November 1933 – 24 March 2025) was a Surinamese politician who was a member of the Progressive Reform Party, he served as Minister of District Governance and Decentralization and as Minister of Public Works from 1985 to 1986.

Ramkisor died in Paramaribo on 24 March 2025, at the age of 91.
