= Dutch Surinamese =

Boeroes
- 1954 proposal for a flag of Suriname while it was under Dutch administration

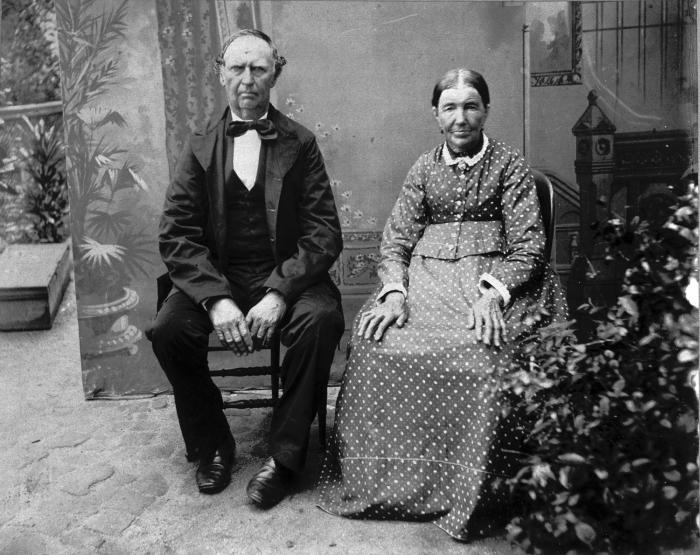
- Boeroe colonists in 1893

Total population
- 1,000–5,000

Regions with significant populations
- Paramaribo, Wanica

Languages
- Dutch; English; Sranan

Religion
- Christianity

Related ethnic groups
- Dutch people

Dutch Surinamese (Dutch: Boeroes; Sranan Tongo: Buru) are Surinamese people of Dutch descent.

Dutch migrants and settlers in search of a better life and economic opportunity started arriving in Suriname in the 19th century with the boeroes (From Boer which means Farmer in Dutch), poor farmers arriving from the Dutch provinces of Gelderland, Utrecht, and Groningen. Furthermore, the Surinamese ethnic group, the Creoles, persons of mixed African and European ancestry, are also mostly partially of Dutch descent.

Many Dutch settlers left Suriname after independence in 1975, diminishing Suriname's Dutch population. Currently there are around 1,000 boeroes, or more (up to 5,000) left in Suriname, and 3,000 outside Suriname. Inside Suriname, they work in several sectors of society. Some families still work in the agricultural sector, much of which has been owned by the said families since the colonial days of Suriname.

== See also ==
- Netherlands–Suriname relations
- Surinamese people in the Netherlands
- Surinamese Dutch
- Dutch diaspora
- White Surinamese
