= Asians in the Americas =

Asians in the Americas may refer to:

== Prehistoric migration ==
- Prehistoric migration and settlement of the Americas from Asia

== Recent migration (c. 1700 CE to present) ==
- Asian Americans (United States)
  - Asian Hispanic and Latino Americans
  - Central Asian Americans
  - East Asian Americans
  - Middle Eastern Americans (includes West Asians)
  - South Asian Americans
  - Southeast Asian Americans
- Asian Canadians
  - East Asian Canadians
  - South Asian Canadians
  - West Asian Canadians
- Asian Caribbean
  - Chinese Caribbean
  - Dougla
  - Indo-Caribbean
  - Marabou
  - Japanese Caribbean
- Asian Latin Americans
  - Asian Argentine
  - Asian Brazilian
  - Asian Mexican
  - Asian Peruvian
- Asian Surinamese
