= Asians in the Netherlands =

Migrant group in the Netherlands

Asians in the Netherlands Aziaten in Nederland
Total population
- 1,023,304

Regions with significant populations
- Amsterdam; Rotterdam; The Hague; Utrecht

Languages
- Dutch; Asian languages; Turkish; Indonesian; Ambonese; Malay; Minang; Batak; Mandarin; Arabic; Kurdish; Hakka; Hindi-Urdu; Persian; Pashto; Punjabi; Tagalog; Vietnamese; Thai; Cantonese; Hokkien; Sarnami Hindustani; Surinamese-Javanese

Religion
- Islam; Hinduism; Christianity; Sikhism; Buddhism; Chinese folk religion (incl. Taoism and Confucianism); Kejawèn; Jainism; Zoroastrianism; Baháʼí; Others

Related ethnic groups
- Asian Surinamese; Asian Americans; Asian Canadians; British Asians; Asians in Germany; Asians in Sweden; Asian diaspora

Asians in the Netherlands (Dutch: Aziaten in Nederland), also referred to as Asian Dutch (Aziatische Nederlanders) or Dutch Asians (Nederlandse Aziaten), are citizens or residents of the Netherlands whose ancestry traces back to Asia. The majority of Dutch Asians hail from Turkey and Indonesia of which the latter was a former Dutch colony and with significant communities hailing from countries such as Syria, China, Iraq, India, Afghanistan, Iran, Pakistan, Philippines, Vietnam, and Thailand.

There is also a sizable community of Asian Caribbeans who hail from the former and present Dutch overseas territories which include Suriname and the former Netherlands Antilles; now Curaçao, Aruba, Bonaire, Sint Maarten, Sint Eustatius and Saba. These are mainly from Suriname and include Indian, Javanese and Chinese Surinamese people.

== History ==
=== Discrimination ===
Racism and discrimination against Asians has persisted since the establishment of former Dutch colonies, like Suriname.

According to a study commissioned by the Dutch Ministry of Social Affairs, over one-third of Dutch individuals of East and Southeast Asian origin roots experienced discrimination during the COVID-19 pandemic. Individuals reported incidents of verbal abuse, exclusion, and discrimination, particularly in public spaces, education, and workplaces, leading to negative psychological outcomes, societal isolation, and distrust of authorities. The findings highlight long-standing discrimination, despite the perception of these groups as a model minority.

Local councillors in Amsterdam and The Hague have raised awareness about the racial slur, "coolie," (koelie), used to refer to Asian indentured labourers in Suriname after the abolition of slavery. In June 2023, a judge ruled that it was used in an insulting way and fined a man €150 for the comment online. Councillors advocate for educational campaigns to inform students about its harmful impact, hoping to reduce its casual use in schools and public spaces.

== See also ==
- Turks in the Netherlands
- Indonesians in the Netherlands
- Arabs in the Netherlands
- Chinese in the Netherlands
- Iranians in the Netherlands
- Iraqis in the Netherlands
- Japanese people in the Netherlands
- Filipinos in the Netherlands
- Surinamese in the Netherlands
- South Asians in the Netherlands
