= Japanese expatriates in Jamaica =

Japanese Jamaicans
Total population
- 188 (as of Oct. 2020) Japanese nationals; unknown number naturalised as citizens of Jamaica

Languages
- English, Japanese

Related ethnic groups
- Japanese diaspora, Japanese Caribbeans, Japanese Cubans, Japanese Dominicans

There is a small community of Japanese expatriates in Jamaica and their descendants (known as Japanese Jamaicans), consisting mostly of corporate employees and their families, along with immigrants and Jamaican-born citizens of Japanese ancestry. As of 2020, 188 Japanese lived in the country, according to the statistics of Japan's Ministry of Foreign Affairs.

== Culture ==
Mighty Crown was inspired by the legendary sound systems like Killamanjaro and Saxon. They were the first non-Jamaican sound system to win the Irish and Chin world clash in 1999.

Jamaican immigrants have influenced Jamaican cuisine and reggae music.

== Notable people ==
- Musashi Suzuki - Jamaican-born Japanese footballer
- Asuka Cambridge - Japanese sprinter

== See also ==
- Jamaica–Japan relations
