= Caribbean Canadians =

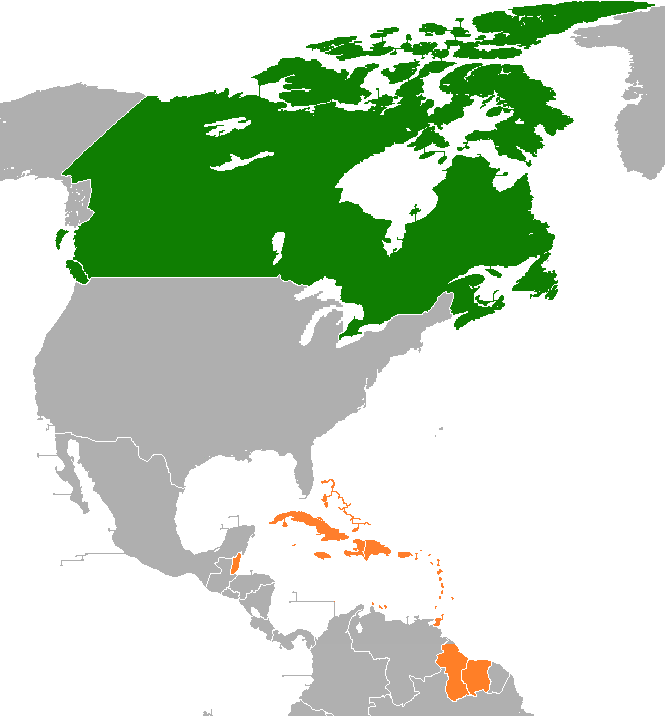

Total population
- 749,155 (2016)

Regions with significant populations
- Ontario, Quebec, Manitoba, Alberta and British Columbia

Languages
- Canadian English; Canadian French; Caribbean languages; others

Religion
- Christianity; Hinduism; Rastafari; Islam; others

Caribbean Canadians are citizens of Canada who were born in the Caribbean or who are of Caribbean descent. Caribbean people first began to settle in Canada in the late eighteenth century. 749,155 people had reported that they have origins in the Caribbean or West Indies in the 2016 Canadian census. Many Caribbean people have immigrated to the country since the 1970s. Many Caribbean immigrants in Canada are from Jamaica, but there are also immigrants from Barbados, Guyana and Haiti and Trinidad and Tobago. Most Caribbean Canadians reside in Toronto and Montreal.

== See also ==
=== Countries of origin ===
- Barbadian Canadians
- Guyanese Canadians
- Haitian Canadians
- Jamaican Canadians
- Trinidadian and Tobagonian Canadians

=== Other ===
- Canada–Caribbean relations
- Caribbean music in Canada
- Caribana
- Caribbean people
- Culture of the Caribbean
- Indo-Canadians (Indo-Caribbean people)
- Black Canadians (Afro-Caribbean people)
- White Caribbean people
- Asian Caribbean people
- Japanese Caribbean people
- Latin American Canadians
