= Guyanese community in Toronto =

- (Guyana) (Canada)

Total population
- Toronto: 31,025; Greater Toronto Area: 64,885

Languages
- English, Guyanese Creole

Religion
- Christianity, Hindu, Islam

Related ethnic groups
- Black Canadians, Indian Canadians

The Guyanese community in Toronto consists of Guyanese migrants that have come to Toronto, as well as their descendants. In 2021, there were 31,025 Guyanese living in Toronto making it the largest South American community in Toronto and making it the largest Guyanese community outside Guyana along with New York City. Guyanese make up 2.4% of Toronto's population.

== History ==
In the 1970s many Guyanese migrated to Canada due to political tensions and better life opportunity where most of them moved to Toronto. In 2011, there were over 70,000 Guyanese in the Greater Toronto Area making in one of the largest foreign communities in the area. Guyana has a consulate in Toronto. Many Guyanese are of African and Indian background making it one of the most diverse foreign communities in Toronto. It is also one of the largest Afro communities in Toronto along with Jamaicans and Trinidadians. In 2021, there were 86,000 Guyanese in whole Canada and alone 78,000 in Ontario where over 90% of the Guyanese community resides. About 30,000 to 50,000 Guyanese reside in Toronto and there were several restaurants, community centre and traditional festival across the city. Many Guyanese are second generation Guyanese-Canadians and have double passports. Many cities in Greater Toronto Area, including Brampton, Vaughan and Markham also have a high amount of Guyanese people.

Number of Guyanese in Greater Toronto Area
#	City	People
1.	Toronto	31,025
2.	Brampton	13,920
3.	Mississauga	6,240
4.	Markham	3,080
5.	Ajax	3,005
6.	Pickering	2,370
7.	Vaughan	1,955
8.	Whitby	1,475
9.	Oshawa	1,305
10.	Kitchener	1,260

Along the cities in Greater Toronto Area, Pickering has the largest percentage of Guyanese, making 6.6% of the city's population.

== See also ==
- List of Guyanese Canadians
- Demographics of Toronto
