= Surinamese people in the Netherlands =

Surinamese people in the Netherlands Surinamers in Nederland
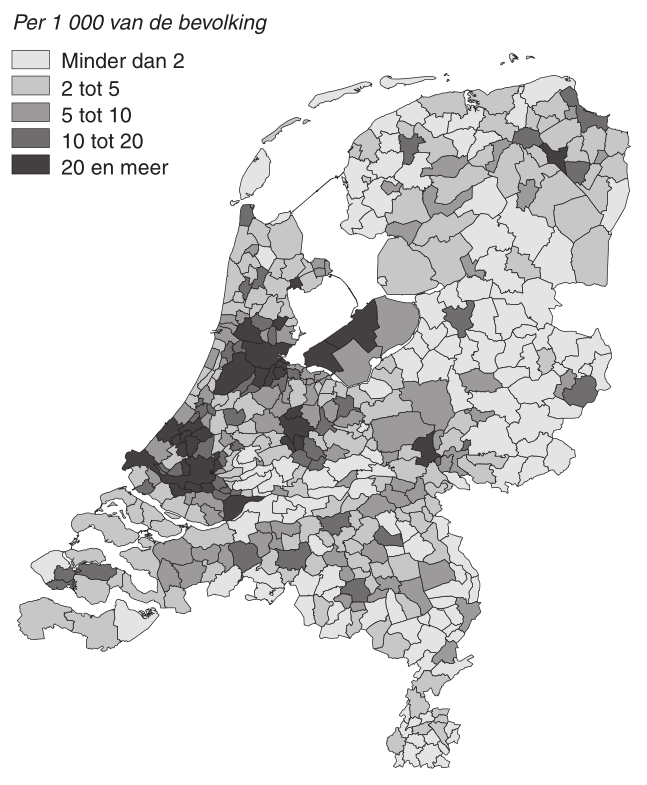
- Distribution of Surinamese people in the Netherlands (2011)

Total population
- 365,000 (2023)

Regions with significant populations
- Amsterdam; Rotterdam; The Hague; Utrecht; Almere; Zoetermeer

Languages
- Dutch · Sranan Tongo · Sarnami Hindustani · Surinamese-Javanese · Maroon languages · Indigenous languages · Chinese languages

Religion
- Majority: Christianity; Hinduism; Significant Minority: Islam; Other Minority: Winti; Kejawèn; Chinese folk religion (incl. Taoism and Confucianism); Buddhism; Indigenous Amerindian religion; Irreligious; Others

Related ethnic groups
- Indians in the Netherlands · Afro-Dutch people · Indonesians in the Netherlands · Chinese people in the Netherlands

Surinamese people in the Netherlands (Dutch: Surinamers in Nederland), also Surinamese Dutch (Surinaamse Nederlanders) or Dutch Surinamese (Nederlandse Surinamers), are people in the Netherlands who come from a Surinamese background. From 1667 to 1975, Suriname was a colony of the Netherlands.

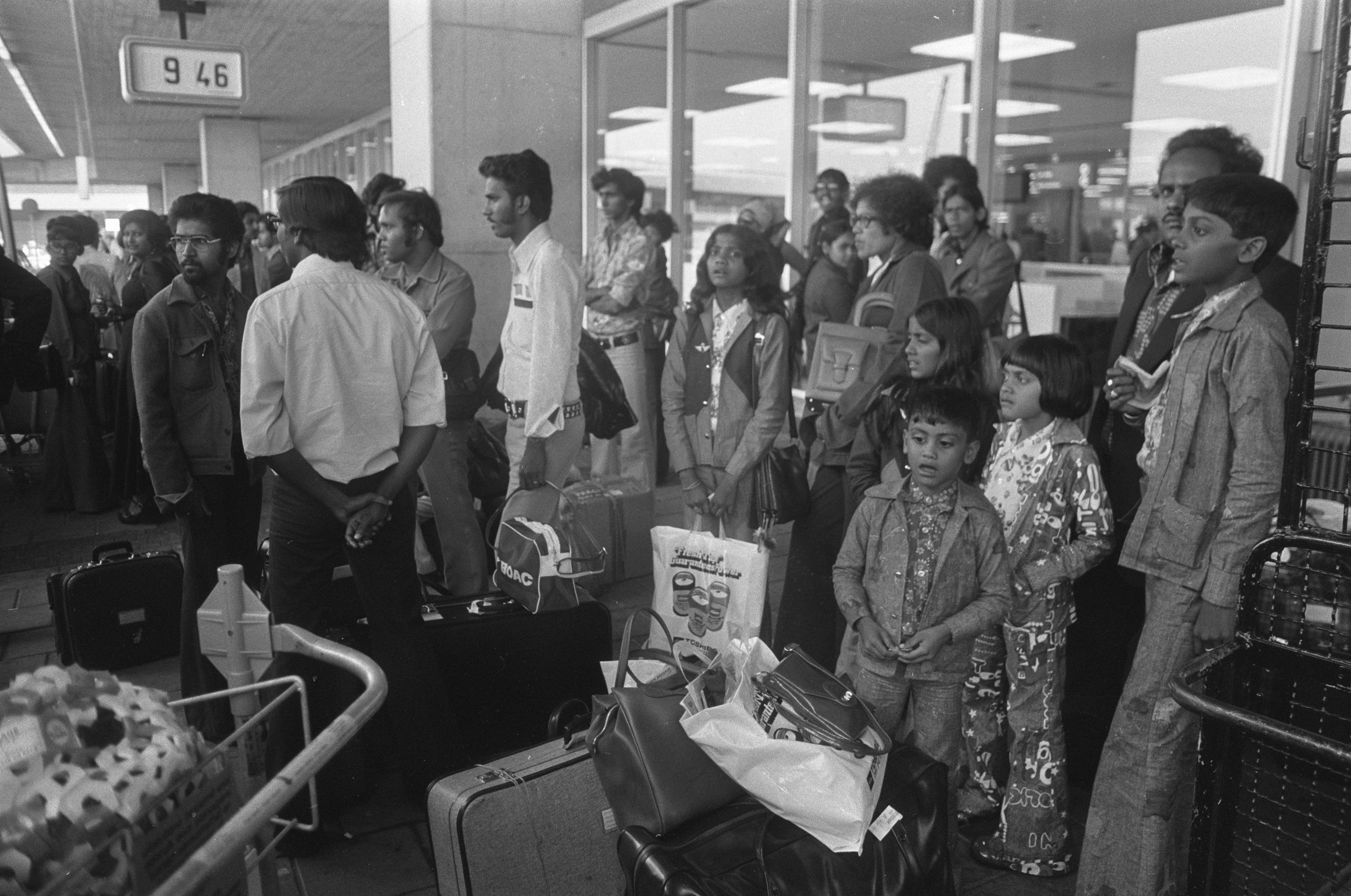
Arrival of Surinamese at Schiphol (September 1975)

Migration began during the colonial era. Initially this was mainly the colonial elite but expanded during the 1920s and 1930s to the less fortunate inhabitants looking for better education, employment or other opportunities. The choice of becoming Surinamese or Dutch citizens in the years leading up to Suriname's independence in 1975 led to a mass migration to the Netherlands. This migration continued in the period immediately after independence and during military rule in the 1980s and for largely economic reasons extended throughout the 1990s. The Surinamese community in the Netherlands numbered 350,300 as of 2013. Most have a Dutch passport and the majority have been successfully integrated into Dutch society. There are also Surinamese people who have migrated to the Netherlands from French Guiana or the Netherlands Antilles.

== Demographic characteristics ==
The Netherlands has approximately 365,000 people of Surinamese descent, making it the largest Caribbean community in Europe and one of the largest community from the Americas. It also make 37% of the entire Surinamese population worldwide. Since the Surinamese independence in 1975, over 100,000 Surinamese came to the Netherlands due to the unrest in Suriname and the better life quality in the Netherlands. In 2000, approximately 300,000 Surinamese lived in the Netherlands.

The Suriname community in the Netherlands is visible in many places, especially in football. Famous footballers like Ruud Gullit and Virgil van Dijk are of Surinamese descent. Female singer Milly Scott and kickboxer Ernesto Hoost are also of Surinamese descent. Netherlands is the only country outside the Americas that has a direct flight to Suriname with direct flight connection from Schiphol to the capital Paramaribo. Surinamese community also celebrates various festivals in the Netherlands and there are many signs that are written in Sranan Tongo, a Surinamese Creole language.

Amsterdam, the Dutch city with most Surinamese population and the 2nd largest Surinamese population after Paramaribo, has numerous Surinamese restaurants and community centers. Many of them settled in the Bijlmermeer ("Bijlmer") because they were kept out of the inner cities by landlords and city councils (some districts were closed to them because most were non-white), but were recruited by the Housing Corporation Ons Belang die Gliphoeve I in 1971 with the slogan 'We do not discriminate'. This led to a sudden increase in residents (2000 people live in 367 homes, sometimes twenty in one flat), which the flat and the organisation behind it could not cope with. In fact Gliphoeve thus became a "Surinamese enclave" in the Bijlmer: around 90% of the more than 600 houses were occupied by Surinamese Dutch citizens. Suriname Museum in Amsterdam has opened in 2025, honouring 50 years of the Surinamese independence. The museum shows about the country and the history of Surinamese community in the Netherlands.

Surinamese Dutch are an ethnically and culturally diverse community. In the Netherlands, Indo-Surinamese, Afro-Surinamese and Javanese Surinamese people form the largest groups, with smaller groups of Chinese people. Other groups consist of indigenous people, Jews (Sephardic and Ashkenazi), Lebanese, Portuguese and Surinamese people of mixed descent.

Number of Surinamese in larger cities
#	City	People
1.	Amsterdam	65,218
2.	Rotterdam	53,420
3.	The Hague	46,746
4.	Almere	23,272
5.	Zoetermeer	9,043
6.	Utrecht	8,277
7.	Zaanstad	6,294
8.	Lelystad	5,337
9.	Haarlemmermeer	5,193
10.	Capelle aan den IJssel	4,723

== Notable individuals ==
=== In politics ===
- Kathleen Ferrier
- Laetitia Griffith
- Tanja Jadnanansing
- Sylvana Simons
- Franc Weerwind
- Raoul White

=== In sports ===
- Virgil van Dijk
- Ruud Gullit
- Ernesto Hoost
- Clarence Seedorf
- Edgar Davids
- Aron Winter

== See also ==
- Netherlands–Suriname relations
- Surinamese people
- Surinamese people in Belgium
- Surinamese Americans
