= Suriname–United States relations =

- Suriname: United States

Diplomatic relations between the United States and Suriname were established on 23 January 1976. Suriname has an embassy in Washington, D.C. since 1976, and a consulate in Miami. The United States had a consulate in Paramaribo since 25 November 1975, the date of independence which was upgraded to an embassy on 18 February 1976.

== History ==
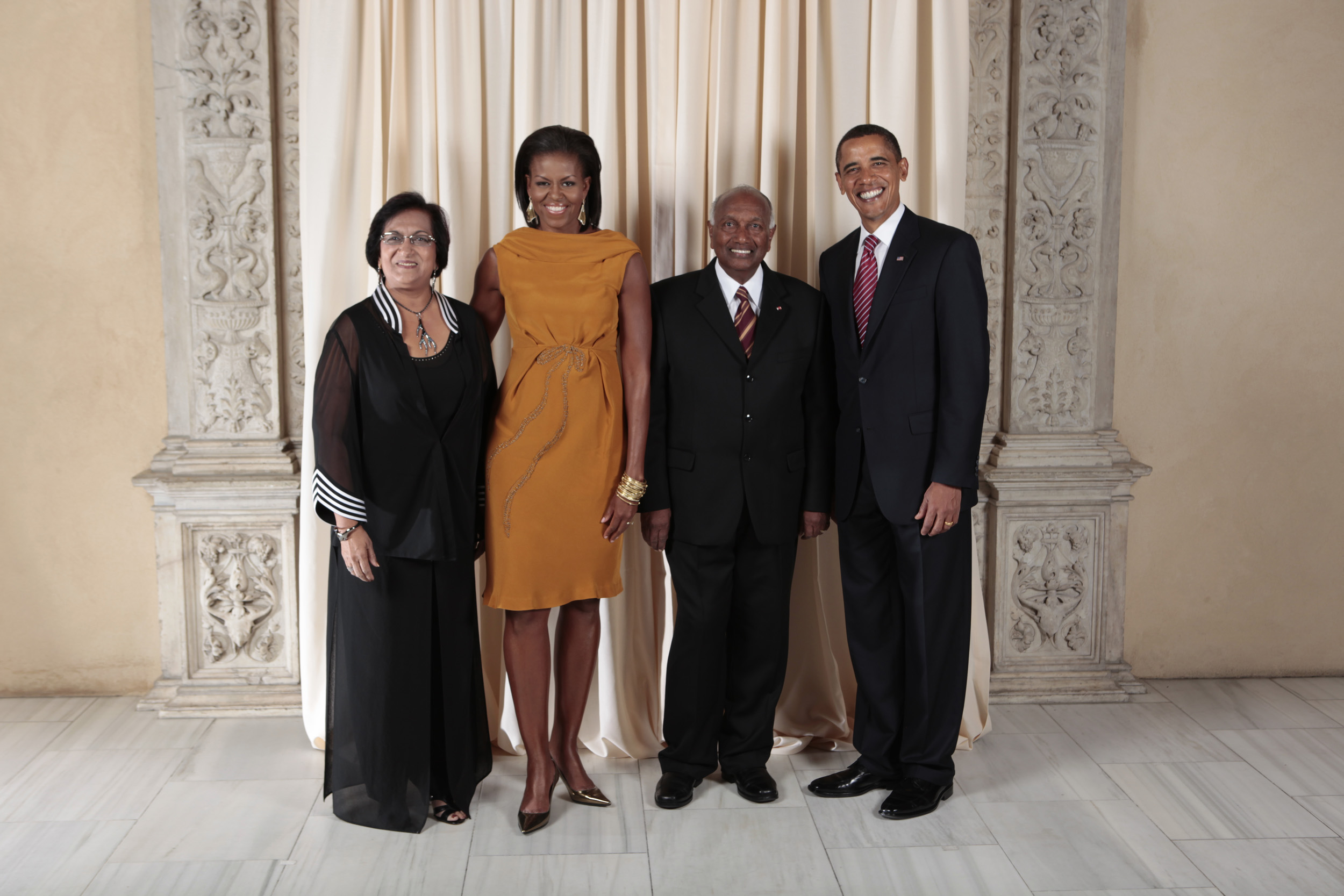
Mrs. Sardjoe-Biharie, Michelle Obama, Vice President Ramdien Sardjoe and President Barack Obama (2009)

Since the reestablishment of a democratic, elected government in 1991, the United States has maintained positive and mutually beneficial relations with Suriname based on the principles of democracy, respect for human rights, rule of law, and civilian authority over the military. To further strengthen civil society and bolster democratic institutions, the U.S. has provided training regarding appropriate roles for the military in civil society to some of Suriname's military officers and decision makers. In addition, narcotics trafficking organizations are channeling increasing quantities of cocaine through Suriname for repackaging and transport to Europe and the United States, and of ecstasy for transport to the United States. To assist Suriname in the fight against drugs and associated criminal activity, the U.S. has helped train Surinamese anti-drug squad personnel. The U.S. and Suriname also have significant partnerships in fighting trafficking in persons and money laundering.

Since 2000, the U.S. has donated a criminal records database to the police as well as computers, vehicles, and radio equipment. Projects through which the U.S. has supported the judicial system include case management and computer hardware donation. Along with training projects, these programs have led to a strong relationship with law enforcement entities in Suriname.

The U.S. Peace Corps in Suriname works with the Ministry of Regional Development and rural communities to encourage community development in Suriname's interior.

Suriname is densely forested, and increased interest in large-scale commercial logging and mining in Suriname's interior have raised environmental concerns. The U.S. Forest Service, the Smithsonian, and numerous non-governmental environmental organizations have promoted technical cooperation with Suriname's government to prevent destruction of the country's tropical rain forest, one of the most diverse ecosystems in the world. U.S. experts have worked closely with local natural resource officials to encourage sustainable development of the interior and alternatives such as ecotourism. On December 1, 2000, UNESCO designated the 16,000 square kilometre Central Suriname Nature Reserve as a World Heritage Site. Suriname's tourism sector remains a minor part of the economy, and tourist infrastructure is limited (in 2004, some 145,000 foreign tourists visited Suriname).

Suriname's efforts in recent years to liberalize economic policy created new possibilities for U.S. exports and investments. The U.S. remains one of Suriname's principal trading partners, largely due to ALCOA's longstanding investment in Suriname's bauxite mining and processing industry. Several U.S. corporations represented by Surinamese firms acting as dealers are active in Suriname, largely in the mining, consumer goods, and service sectors. Principal U.S. exports to Suriname include chemicals, vehicles, machine parts, meat, and wheat. U.S. consumer products are increasingly available through Suriname's many trading companies. Opportunities for U.S. exporters, service companies, and engineering firms will probably expand over the next decade.

Suriname is looking to U.S. and other foreign investors to assist in the commercial development of its vast natural resources and to help finance infrastructure improvements. Enactment of a new investment code and intellectual property rights protection legislation which would strengthen Suriname's attractiveness to investors has been discussed; the investment law was approved by the National Assembly and is currently being revised by the Ministry of Finance.

According to the 2012 U.S. Global Leadership Report, 51% of Surinamese people approve of U.S. leadership, with 4% disapproving and 45% uncertain, the fifth-highest rating for any surveyed country in the Americas.

== Trade ==
In 2019, Suriname exported US$76 million worth of goods to the United States with the main products being fish and refined petroleum which constitutes 2.93% of total exports. In 2019, the United States exported US$384 million worth of goods with the main products being excavation machinery and refined petroleum, which constitutes 21.5% of total imports of Suriname making it the largest exporter to Suriname.

== See also ==
- Surinamese Americans
- Foreign relations of Suriname
- Foreign relations of the United States
- List of ambassadors of the United States to Suriname
- List of ambassadors of Suriname to the United States
