= Caribbean people =

Residents or people from the Caribbean region

Total population
- c. 45–47 million

Regions with significant populations
- Haiti: 12 million
- Dominican Republic: 11.5 million
- Cuba: 11 million
- United States: 4.5 million
- Puerto Rico: 3.4 million
- Jamaica: 2.7 million
- Trinidad and Tobago: 1.5 million
- France: 1.2 million
- United Kingdom: 1.0 million
- Netherlands: 850 thousand
- Guyana: 790 thousand
- Canada: 750 thousand
- Suriname: 633 thousand

Languages
- Spanish, French, French-based creole languages (Haitian Creole, Antillean Creole), English, English-based creole languages (Jamaican Patois, Bahamian Creole, Trinidadian Creole, Guyanese Creole, Bajan Creole, Sranan Tongo), Papiamento, Dutch, Caribbean Hindustani, Chinese, Javanese

Religion
- Majority: Christianity; Minority: Hinduism; Islam; Judaism; Rastafari; Baháʼí; Afro-American religion; Traditional African religions; Amerindian religions; Buddhism; Sikhism; Jainism; Zoroastrianism; Taoism; Confucianism; Chinese folk religion; Kebatinan; Others

Related ethnic groups
- Americans, Canadians, Latin Americans

Caribbean people are the people born in or inhabiting the Caribbean, or people of Caribbean descent living outside the region.

The Caribbean region was originally populated by Amerindians from several different Kalinago and Taino groups. These groups were largely decimated by a combination of enslavement, warfare and disease brought by the European colonizers.

Modern Caribbean people usually further identify by their own specific ethnic ancestry, therefore constituting various subgroups, of which are: Afro-Caribbean (largely descendants of enslaved Africans), Multiracial Caribbean (descendants of two or more ethnicities, such as Mulattos, Mestizos and Douglas), Hispanic/Latino-Caribbean, Spanish-speaking Caribbean people who largely descended from solely or a mixture of Spaniards, West Africans and Taino peoples), White Caribbean (largely descendants of European colonizers), Asian Caribbean who are mainly divided between Indo-Caribbean (largely descendants of Indian jahaji indentured laborers and free immigrants) and Chinese Caribbean (largely descendants of free Chinese immigrants and indentured workers), and Indigenous Caribbean (largely descendants of the indigenous people of the Caribbean with some degree of admixture).

As of 2024, the Caribbean population is estimated to be approximately 44.8 million, with a growth rate of around 0.54% from the previous year.

Haiti has the largest population in the Caribbean with over 12 million people. It is also the fastest growing country in the Caribbean, surpassing the population of Cuba in 2021. Over 3 million Haitians live in other countries such as France, the United States and Canada due to political unrest and violence.

== History ==
The first people to live in the Caribbean were Native American groups like the Carib, Arawak, and Ciboney, who migrated from South America, including areas like Venezuela. Their populations were decimated by Spanish colonizers.

== Caribbean diaspora ==
The largest diasporas of Caribbean people outside of the Caribbean region can be found in the United States (4.2 million), France (1.2 million), the United Kingdom (1.0 million), the Netherlands (850 thousand), and Canada (750 thousand).

=== Canada ===
Canada has about 750,000 people of Caribbean descent. Mostly from countries like Jamaica, Guyana, Haiti and Trinidad and Tobago. Many of them migrated to Canada in the 1970s. Many Jamaicans, Guyanese and Trinidadians reside in Toronto and its suburbs. Greater Toronto Area is home to 250,000 people of Caribbean descent. The festival Caribana which takes place every summer in Toronto is one of the largest Caribbean festival outside Caribbean. Many Haitians reside in Montreal and other places in Quebec.

=== Netherlands ===
The Netherlands has approximately 850,000 people of Caribbean descent, including over 500,000 in the mainland Netherlands and over 300,000 in Dutch Caribbean. Caribbean community in the Netherlands are mainly from former Dutch colonies such as Suriname, Curaçao and Aruba. Amsterdam has the largest Surinamese community (65,000) and Rotterdam has the largest Dutch Caribbean community (30,000) in the Netherlands. There are many events in Dutch larger cities organised by Caribbean communities.

== Culture ==
- List of Caribbean music genres

== See also ==
- Afro-Caribbean
- British African-Caribbean people
- Indigenous peoples of the Caribbean
- Caribbean region of Colombia
- Indo-Caribbean
- Asian Caribbean
- White Caribbean
- West Indian
- West Indian American
- Caribbean Canadians
- List of Eastern Caribbean people
