= Raoul White =

Dutch politician (born 1972)

Member of the House of Representatives
- In office 6 December 2023 – 11 November 2025

Personal details
- Born: 16 September 1972 (age 53) Paramaribo, Suriname
- Party: GroenLinks

Raoul Julian White (born 16 September 1972) is a Suriname-born Dutch politician representing the GroenLinks who served on the House of Representatives between December 2023 and November 2025. His focus was on kingdom relations, slavery in the Netherlands, livable neighborhoods, and small and medium-sized enterprises.

== Career ==
White has worked as a social worker and a manager at a welfare organization. Before his election to the House, he was part of the executive committee of the borough of Amsterdam-Zuidoost.

=== House committee assignments ===
- Committee for the Interior
- Petitions committee (chair)
- Committee for Kingdom Relations
- Delegation to the Interparliamentary Committee on the Dutch Language Union

== Personal life ==
White is of Surinamese descent.

== Electoral history ==
Electoral history of Raoul White
Year	Body	Party	Pos.	Votes	Result		Ref.
Year	Body	Party	Pos.	Votes	Party seats	Individual	Ref.
2023	House of Representatives	GroenLinks–PvdA	21	3,192	25	Won	
2025	House of Representatives	GroenLinks–PvdA	30	1,852	20	Lost	

== See also ==
- List of members of the House of Representatives of the Netherlands, 2023–2025
