= Last =

Mechanical form shaped like a human foot

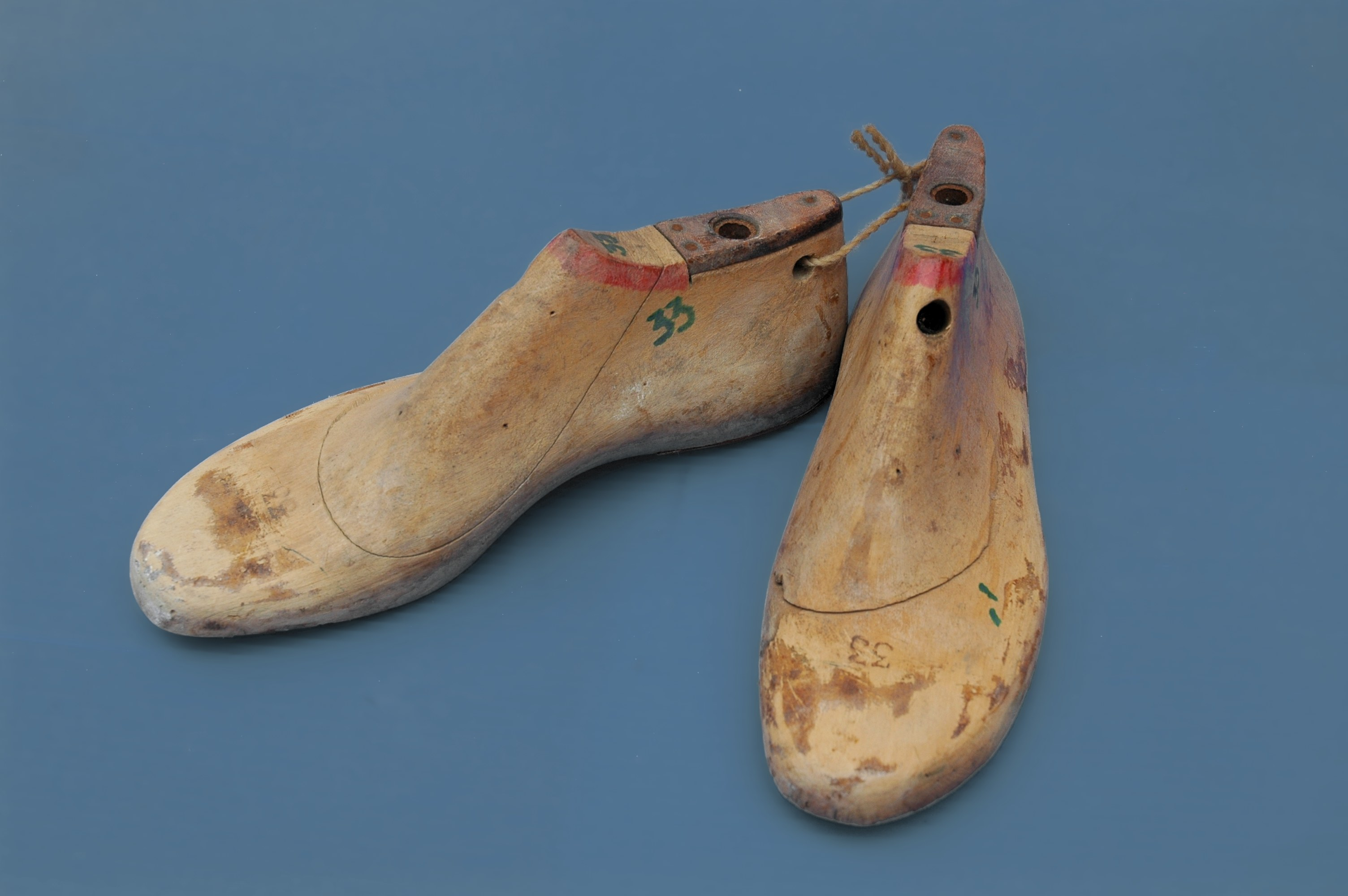
A pair of wooden lasts

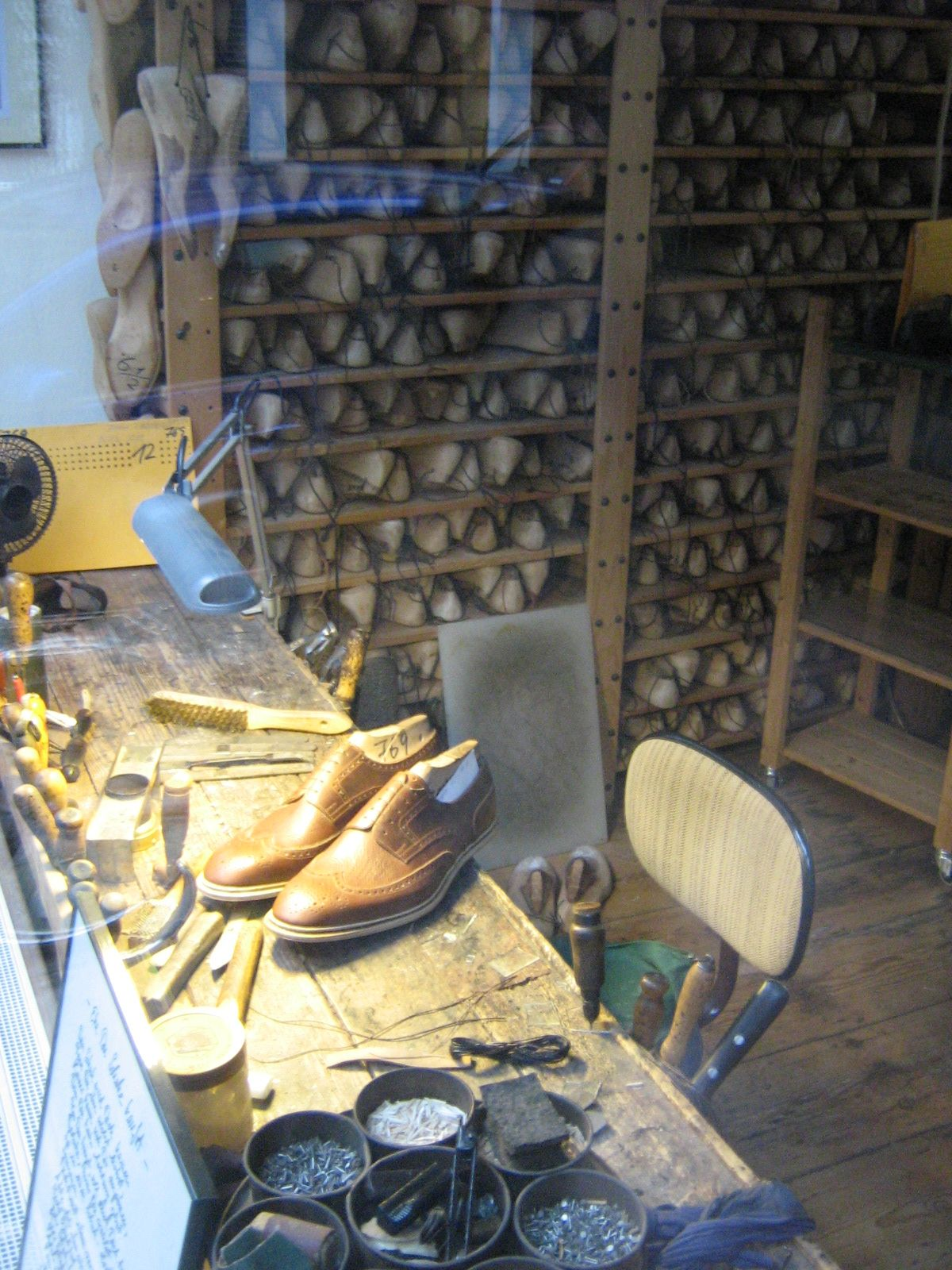
Wooden lasts in a shoemaker's workshop in Hamburg, Germany

A last is a mechanical form used by shoemakers and cordwainers in the manufacture and repair of shoes. Lasts come in many styles and sizes, depending on the exact job they are designed for. Common variations include simple one-size lasts used for repairing soles and heels, custom-purpose mechanized lasts used in modern mass production, and custom-made lasts used in the making of bespoke footwear. Lasts are made of firm materials—hardwoods, cast iron, and high-density plastics—to withstand contact with wetted leather and the strong forces involved in reshaping it. Since the early 19th century, lasts typically come in pairs to match the separate shapes of the right and left feet. The development of an automated lasting machine by the Surinamese-American Jan Ernst Matzeliger in the 1880s was a major development in shoe production, immediately improving quality, halving prices, and eliminating the previous putting-out systems surrounding shoemaking centers.

== Name ==
The English word last is thought to derive from a Proto-Germanic term reconstructed as *laistaz and intending a track, a trace, or a footprint. Cognates include Swedish läst, Danish læste, and German Leisten.

== History ==
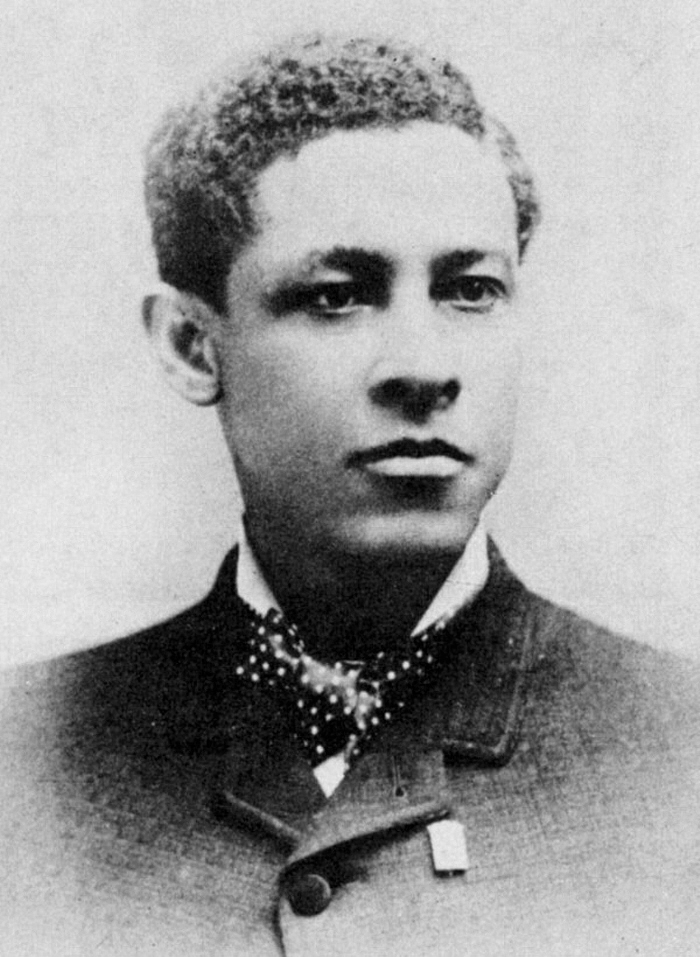
Jan Ernst Matzeliger in 1885

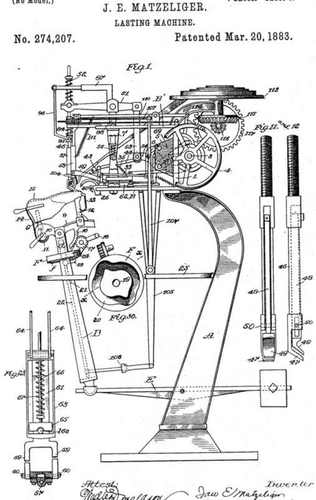
Matzeliger's lasting machine, complex enough the patent office had to send an agent to Lynn to see it in operation

Although Roman cordwainers—bespoke shoemakers—have been found to have shaped some footwear separately for the right and left foot, this distinction was mostly lost following the barbarian invasions in late Antiquity. Upon the return of commercial shoemaking during the High Middle Ages, a single last was used to make shoes for either foot, with the expectation that use would gradually reshape the shoe as needed. The use of such "straights" was particularly important after the rise of both male and female heels in the 17th century made shoemaking more complicated than previously. It was not until the beginning of industrial production and mass marketing in the early 19th century that lasts were again generally made and used in matching pairs. Generic one-size lasts are now only used for basic shoe repair.

Well into the Industrial Revolution, shoe production was optimized by elaborate division of labor in putting-out systems arranged around central workshops but each step of production still required skilled labor. Attempts at mechanization in Britain by Marc Isambard Brunel during the Napoleonic Wars were partial and proved uneconomical after demobilization. Improvements to the sewing machine to suit it for work in leather took until 1850 and the major breakthrough was the Surinamese immigrant Jan Ernst Matzeliger's automated lasting machine, patented in 1883. This instantly centralized production, increased production by as much as 14 times, improved quality, and halved prices.

== Design ==
A last is a mechanical form shaped like a human foot. Lasts come in many styles and sizes, depending on the exact job they are designed for. Common variations include simple uniform lasts for shoe repair, custom-purpose mechanized lasts for shoe factories, and custom-made lasts for bespoke footwear. Though a last is typically made to approximate the shape of a human foot, the precise shape is tailored to the kind of footwear being made. For example, boot lasts typically hug the instep for a close fit. Modern last shapes are now usually designed with dedicated CAD software.

Lasts are typically made from hardwoods, cast iron, and high-density plastics to maintain their shape even after prolonged use in contact with materials like wetted leather and under the mechanical stresses necessary to stretch and shape the material for shoes. Factory lasts must be able to hold the lasting tacks that position the parts of the shoe and then handle the force of the pullover machines used to bottom the shoe and add the sole. The usual material now is high-density polyethylene plastic (HMW-HDPE), which can be easily, cheaply, and precisely shaped, can withstand more damage from the tacks before requiring repair or replacement, and can be recycled once they finally wear out. Wooden lasts are now used only for repair work and bespoke shoemaking, particularly in Europe and North America.

== Custom lasts ==
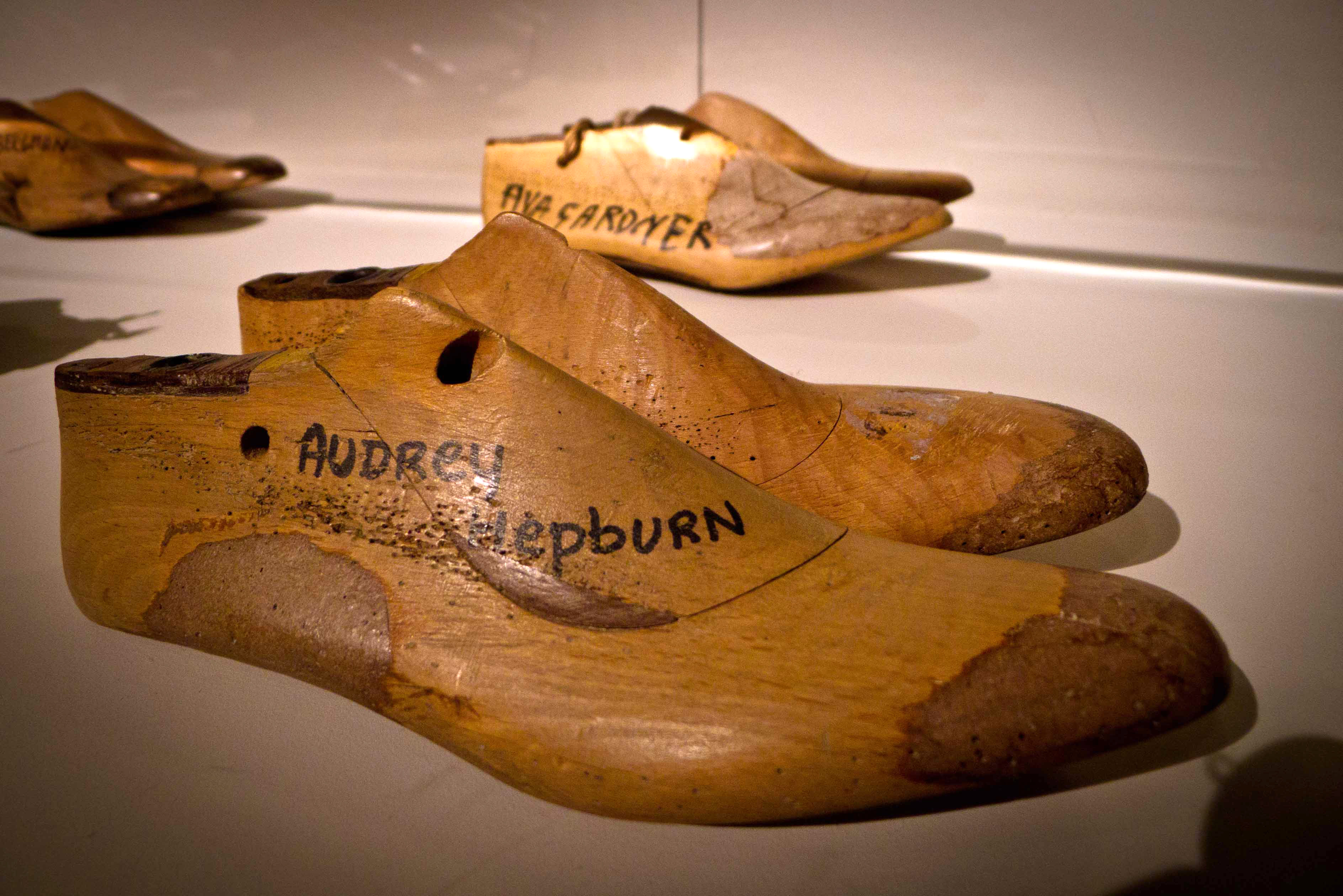
The personal lasts of Audrey Hepburn and Ava Gardner at the Ferragamo Museum in Florence, Italy

Cordwainers often use lasts that are specifically designed to the proportions of individual customers' feet. Made from wood or from various modern materials, they don't need to withstand the pressures of mass production machinery, but they must be able to handle constant tacking and pinning and the wet environment associated with stretching and shaping materials such as leather.

== Gallery ==
Lasts

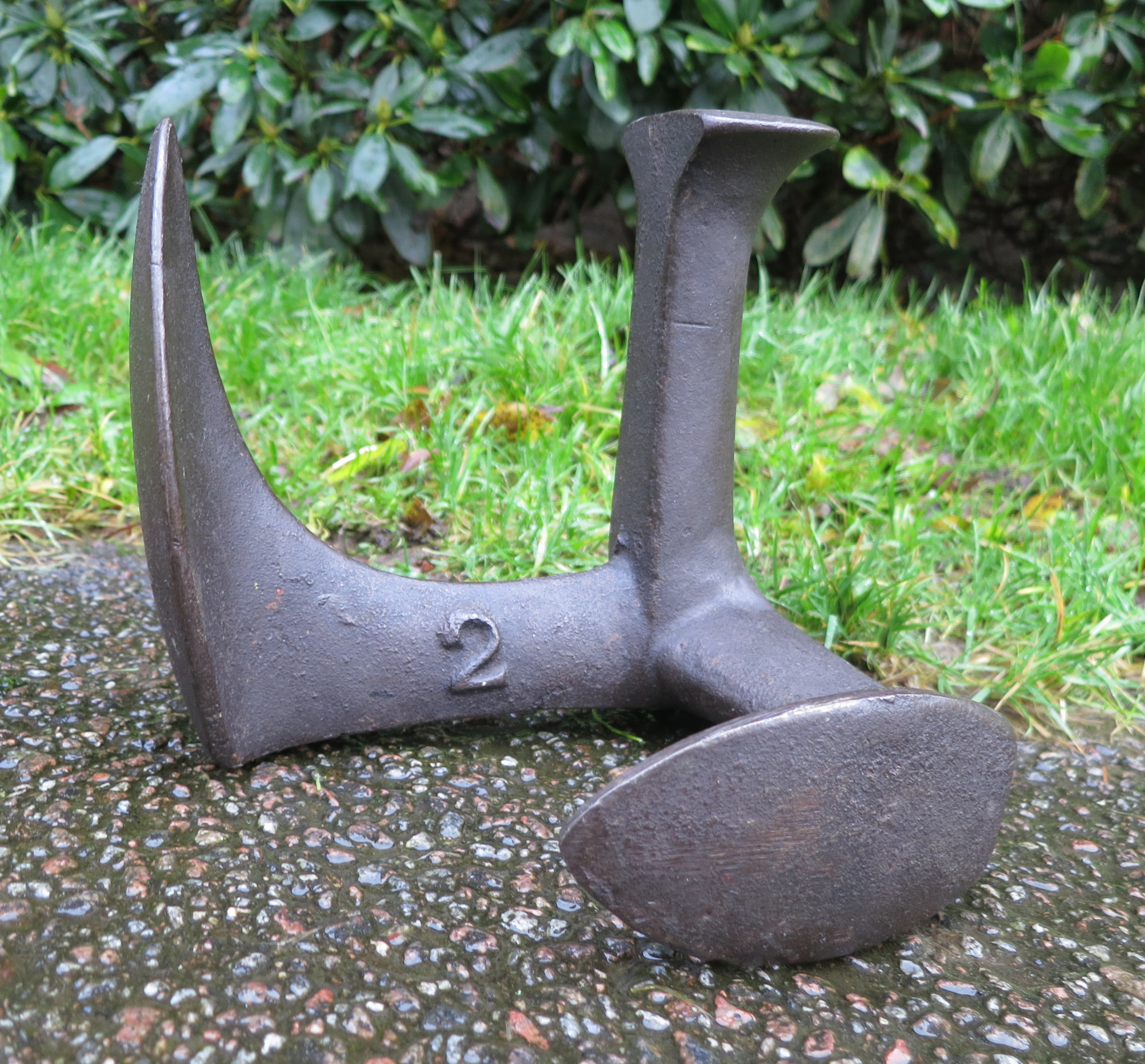
Tripartite metal last

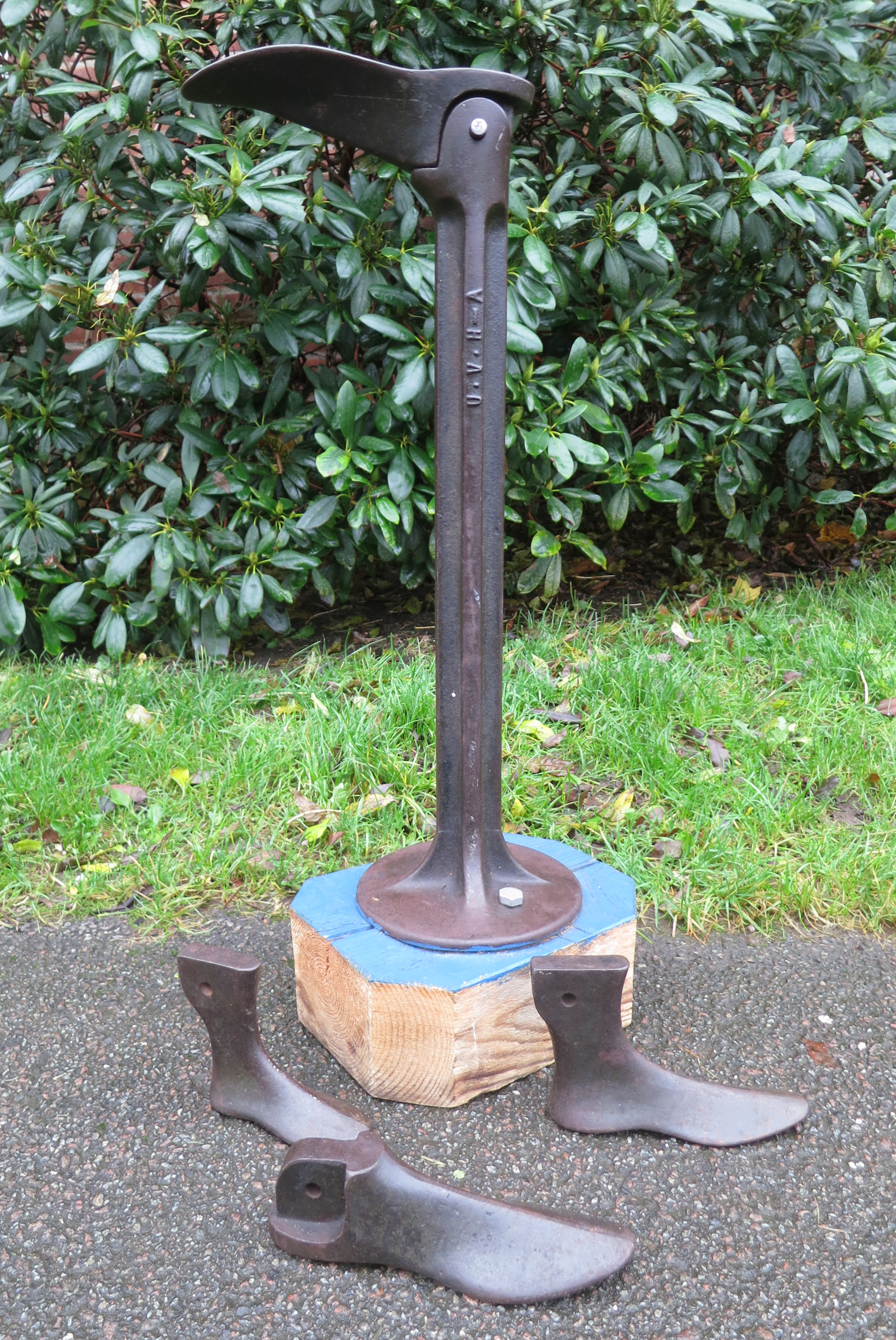
Replaceable metal last on stand

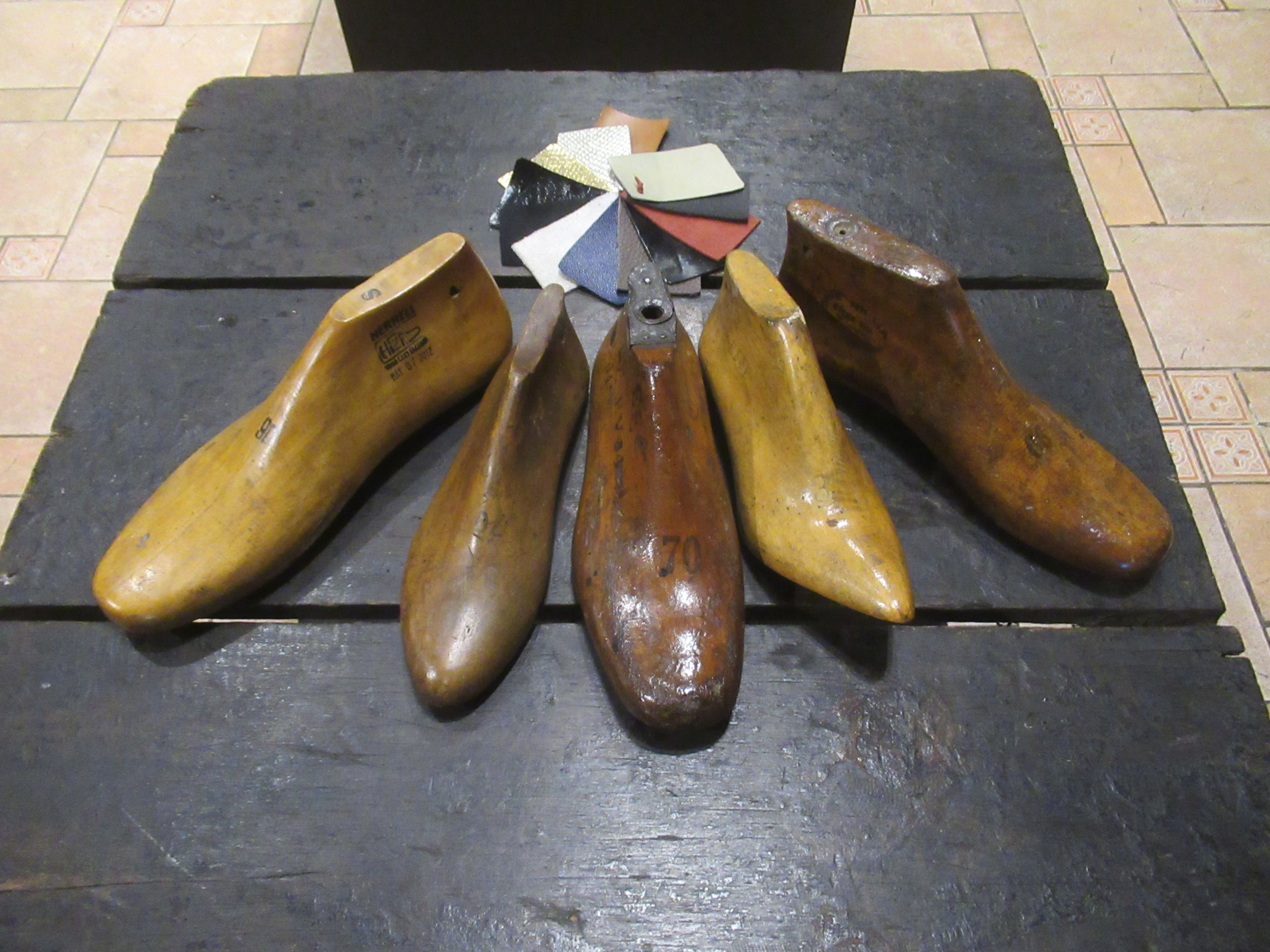
Wooden lasts (Marikina Shoe Museum)

== See also ==
- Shoe size
