= Surinamese people in Belgium =

Total population
- 20,000-30,000

The exact number of Surinamese people in Belgium is unknown. The (legal) Surinamese community in the Belgian capital is in any case very small: In 2015, only two Surinamese women were enrolled in Brussels along with a number of men); in 2012 this was only one. According to figures quoted "in the corridors" of the Surinamese Embassy in Belgium, the total number of Surinamese people in Belgium would be about 30,000, or at least 20,000. According to the diaspora organisation Suriname Diaspora Solidarity Belgium (Surisobe), half of them are illegally present in the country. However, it is not known how Surisobe calculated this number. In October 2016, the embassy indicated that more precise figures are now being mapped out.

Some of the Surinamese people in Belgium use the so-called "Belgian route": they come and live in Belgium with their Dutch partner to circumvent the stricter rules on family reunification in the Netherlands. Their stay in the country is therefore only temporary.

There have been repeated incidents involving Surinamese people in Belgium in drug trafficking to the country. From 1990–1991, a group of Surinamese people with ties to the Surinamese army smuggled cocaine using their own airline, Trans-Caribbean Airlines, to transport the drugs from Paramaribo to Ostend airport. In 2013, four people, including two Surinamese people, suspected of taking small quantities of cannabis and cocaine from the Netherlands to Belgium every fortnight, were arrested.

In 2015 an organisation of fifteen Surinamese people smuggled cocaine into Belgium and sold ecstasy and cannabis in Antwerp. In 2016, ten people were arrested near Mol and Balen who were suspected of smuggling large quantities of cocaine from Suriname to Belgium via French Guiana. In addition, two were picked up in Cayenne. The group consisted of both Surinamese and Dutch people of Surinamese descent.

== See also ==
- Surinamese people in the Netherlands
- Surinamese Americans
