= Jan Ernst Matzeliger =

Dutch inventor

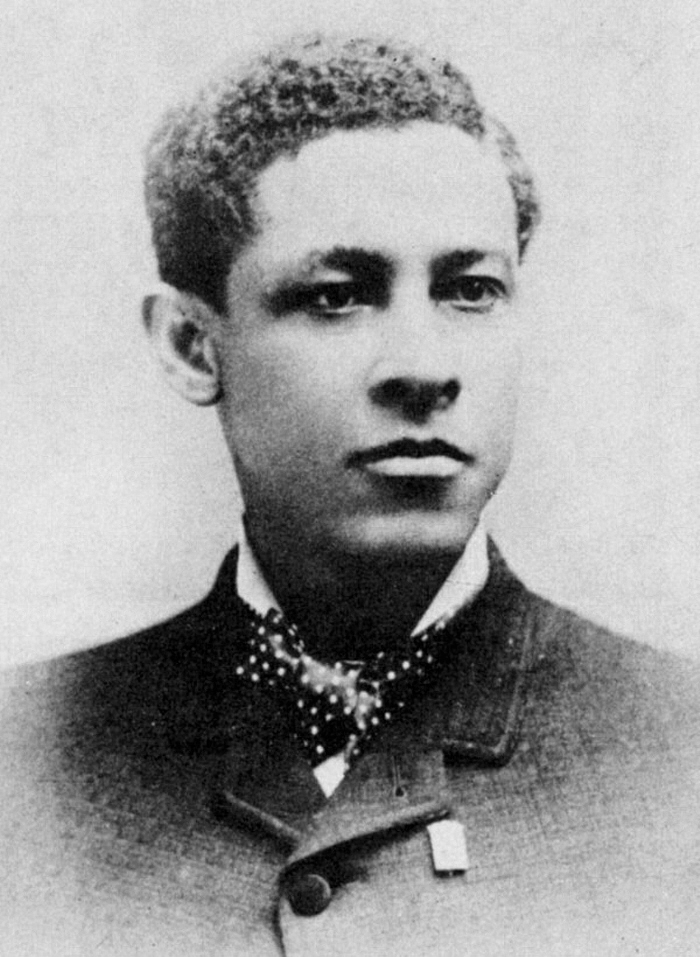
- Matzeliger in 1885
- Born: 15 September 1852; Paramaribo, Suriname
- Died: 24 August 1889 (aged 36); Lynn, Massachusetts, US

Jan Ernst Matzeliger (September 15, 1852 – August 24, 1889) was a Surinamese-American inventor whose automated lasting machine brought significant change to the manufacturing of shoes. The Consolidated Lasting Machine Company was founded to make his shoe-making devices.

== Biography ==
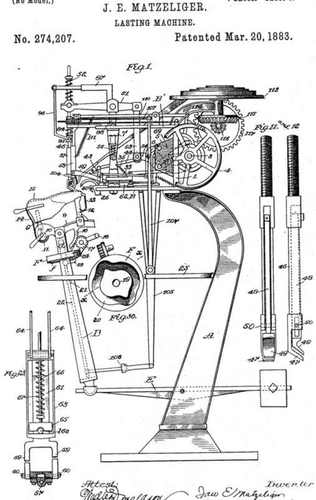
Lasting machine

Matzeliger was born in Dutch Guiana, now Suriname. His father, Ernst Carel Matzeliger Jr. (1823–1864), was a third-generation Dutchman of German descent living in the Dutch Guiana capital city of Paramaribo. Ernst owned and operated the Colonial Shipworks that had been in his family for three generations. His mother was a house slave of African descent who lived on the plantation owned by his father for a time.

At age ten, Matzeliger was apprenticed in the Colonial Shipworks in Paramaribo, where he demonstrated a natural aptitude for machinery and mechanics. Matzeliger left Dutch Guiana at nineteen and worked as a mechanic on a Dutch East Indies merchant ship for several years before settling in Philadelphia, Pennsylvania, where he first learned the shoe trade. By 1877, he spoke adequate English (Dutch was his native tongue) and moved to Massachusetts to pursue his interest in the shoe industry. He eventually went to work at the Harney Brothers Shoe factory.

Matzeliger obtained a patent for his invention of an automated shoe-lasting machine in 1883. A skilled hand laster could produce fifty pairs of shoes in a ten-hour day, whereas Matzeliger's machine could produce between 150 and 700 pairs per day, cutting shoe prices across the nation by half.

=== Death and legacy ===
His early death in Lynn, Massachusetts, from tuberculosis meant he never saw the full profit of his invention. Matzeliger died on August 24, 1889, aged 36.

Matzeliger's invention was perhaps "the most important invention for New England" and "the greatest forward step in the shoe industry", according to the church bulletin of The First Church of Christ (where he was a member) as part of a commemoration held in 1967 in his honour.

A 29-cent US postal stamp was issued on September 15, 1991, in honor of Matzeliger. Designed by Barbara Higgins Bond, the stamp depicts Matzeliger and is a part of the Black Heritage Stamp Series.

Matzeliger was inducted into the National Inventors Hall of Fame in 2006.

== Patents ==
- 274,207, 20 March 1883, Automatic method for lasting shoes
- 421,954, 25 February 1890, Nailing machine
- 423,937, 25 March 1890, Tack separating and distributing mechanism
- 459,899, 22 September 1891, Lasting machine
- 415,726, 26 November 1899, Mechanism for distributing tacks, nails, etc.

== See also ==
- United Shoe Machinery Corporation
