= Suriname Museum =

Museum of Surinamese history in Amsterdam

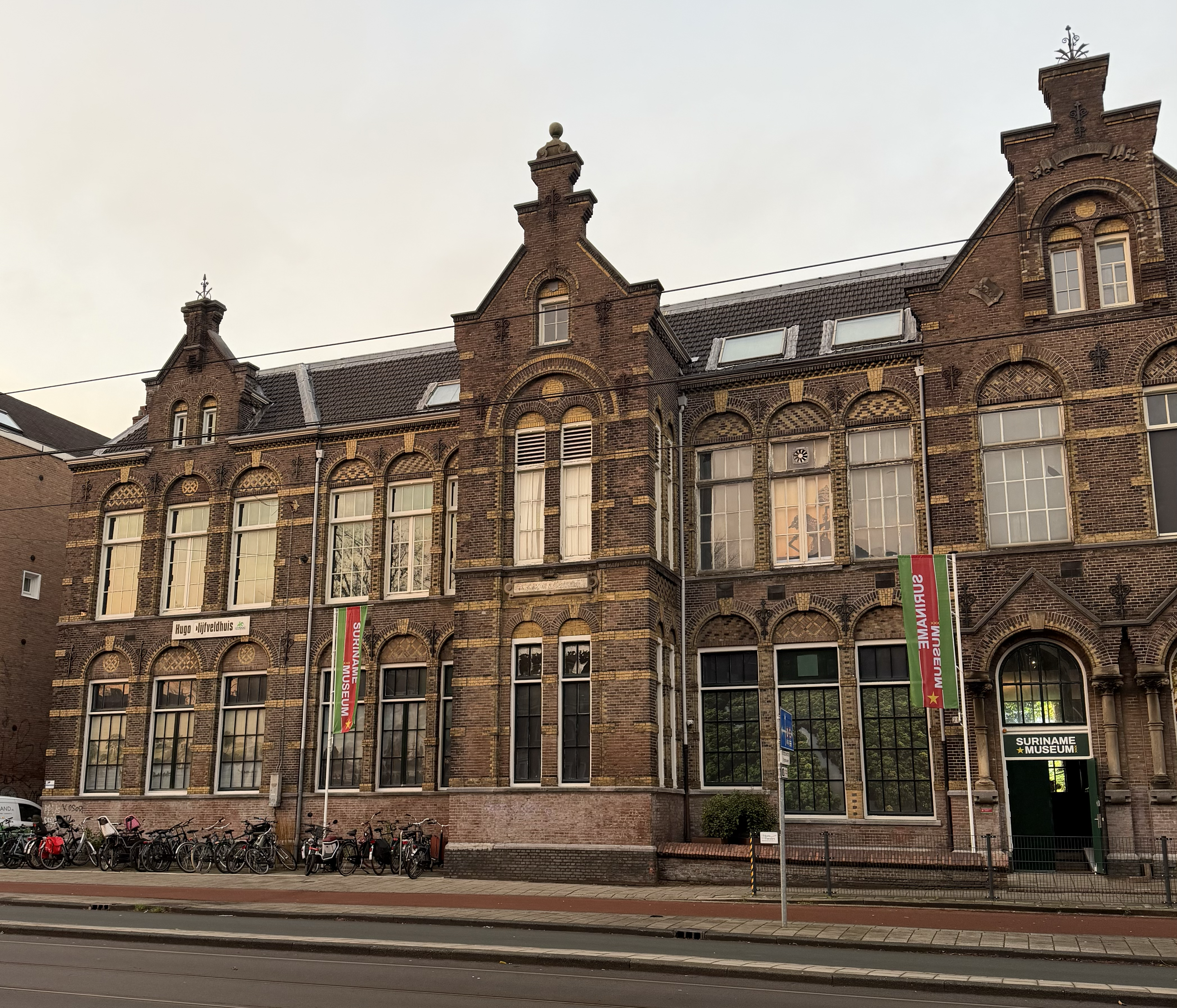
- Suriname Museum in 2025
- Established: November 25, 2025; soft opening September 26, 2025
- Location: Zeeburgerdijk 19–21, Amsterdam, Netherlands
- Type: National history museum; History museum
- Director: Jan Gerards
- Owner: Vereniging Ons Suriname
- Public transit access: Tram: 7 Bus: 22, 246 Train: Amsterdam Muiderpoort railway station
- Website: surinamemuseum.nl

The Suriname Museum is a historical and cultural museum located in Amsterdam, Netherlands, dedicated to the history, heritage, and diaspora of Suriname. Officially opened on 25 November 2025, the 50th anniversary of Surinamese independence, it is the first museum in the Netherlands exclusively focused on Suriname’s past and its enduring ties with the Dutch state and society. The museum is housed in the Hugo Olijfveldhuis building in Amsterdam-Oost and operated by the Stichting Suriname Museum, an initiative of the Vereniging Ons Suriname. Its core exhibition, “Meet Su, Meet Us” covers Indigenous people, colonization, slavery, post-emancipation migration, and the cultural identity of the Surinamese diaspora in the Netherlands.

== History ==
The Suriname Museum opened its doors to the public on 26 September 2025 with a “soft opening” of its inaugural exhibition. The official inauguration took place on 25 November 2025, coinciding with the 50th anniversary of Suriname’s independence, in a ceremony led by King Willem-Alexander of the Netherlands. Amsterdam’s mayor Femke Halsema also spoke at the event. The opening festivities included Surinamese cultural elements, such as a traditional blessing by an Indigenous Sambura group and a performance of the Surinamese national anthem by singer Jeangu Macrooy with a gospel choir.

== Gallery ==
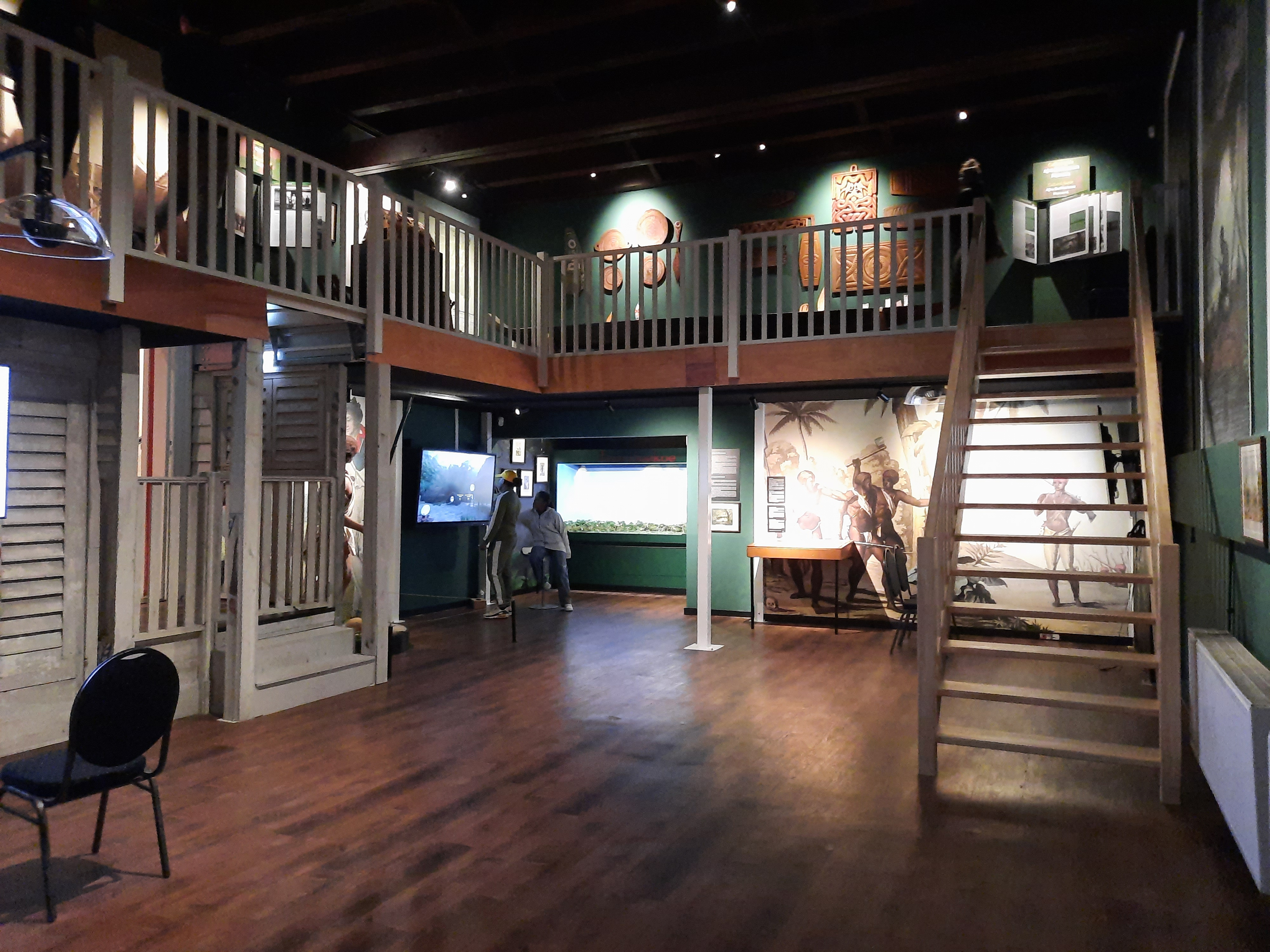
Exhibition room in the museum

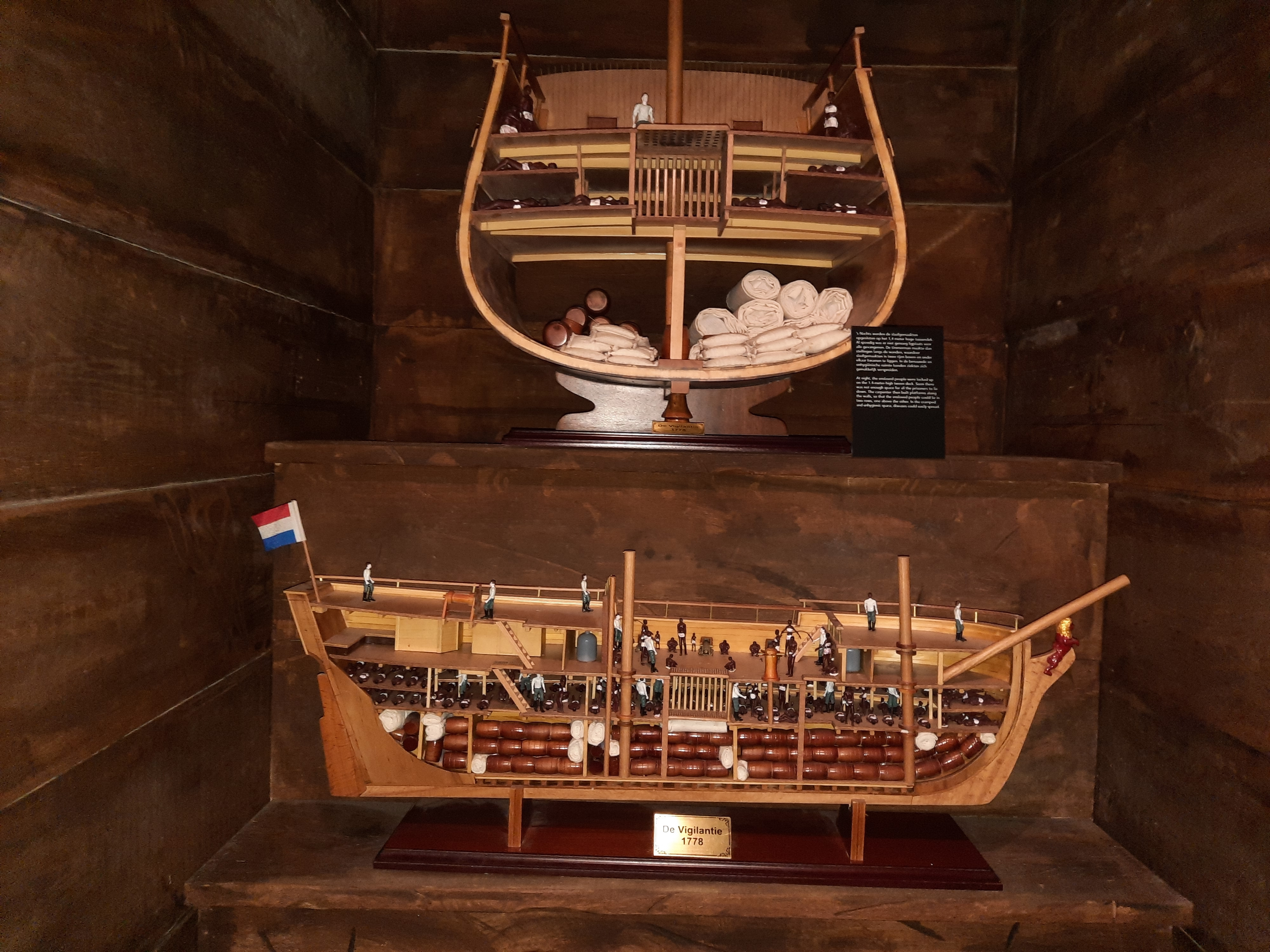
Model of a slave ship in the cellar of the museum

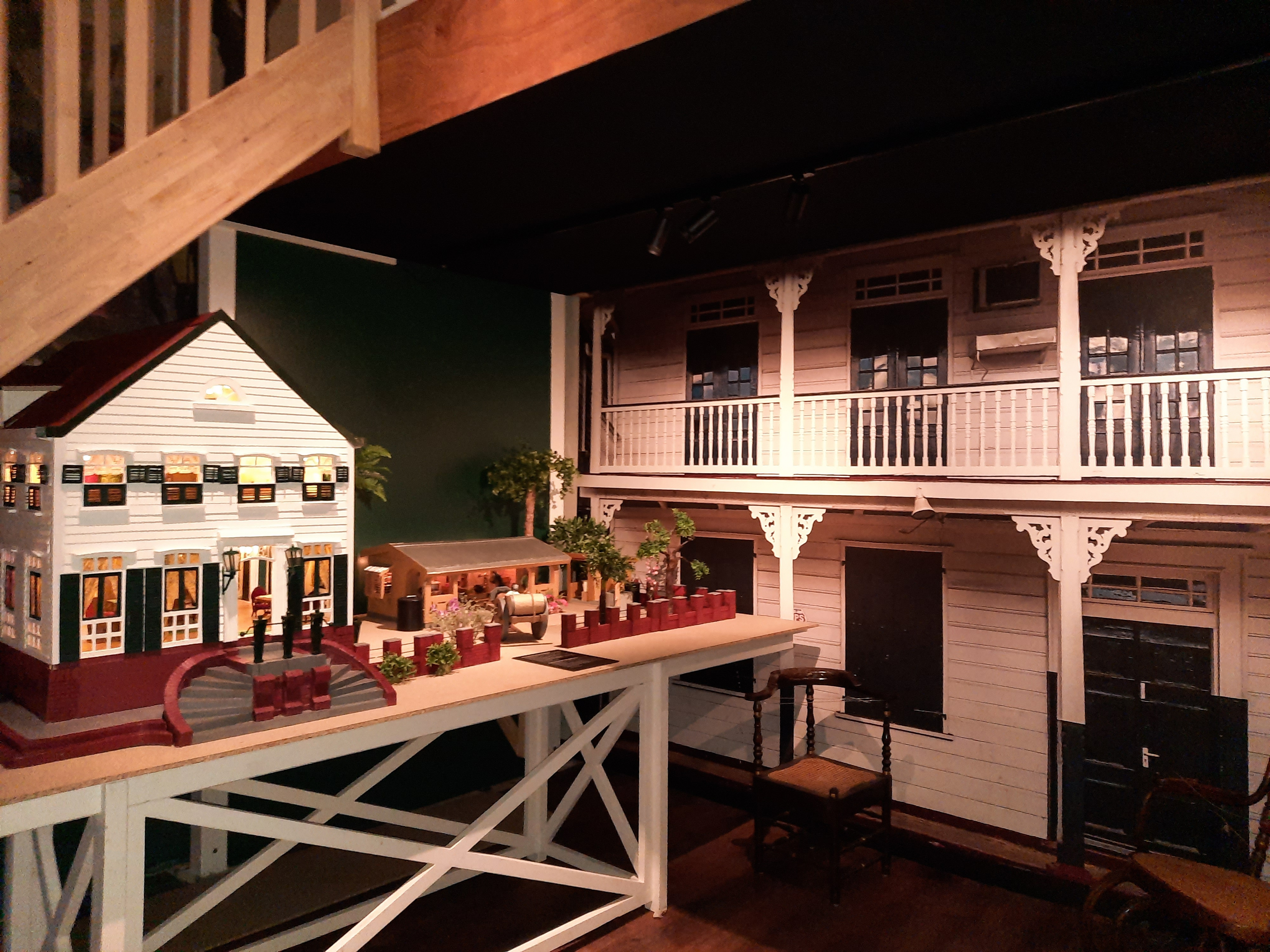
