= Asian Surinamese =

Asian Surinamese people
Languages
- Dutch · Sarnami Hindustani · Surinamese-Javanese · Hakka Chinese · Cantonese · Hokkien · Mandarin · Lebanese Arabic

Religion
- Hinduism · Islam · Christianity · Kejawèn · Chinese folk religion (incl. Taoism and Confucianism) · Buddhism

Related ethnic groups
- Asian Caribbean · Asian Dutch

Asian Surinamese are Surinamese people of Asian descent. Asian migrants to Suriname came mostly from South Asia, Southeast Asia and East Asia. Historically, Asian Surinamese have been present in the country since the 19th century, the majority of which are descended from indentured labourers that were brought to Suriname after the abolition of slavery as replacements for African slaves.

== History ==
Suriname was a plantation colony that depended on slave labour to work on plantations. The Dutch West India Company supplied slaves from West Africa between 1667 until the abolition of slavery on 1 July 1863. Many Afro-Surinamese are descendants of slaves who were transported via the Atlantic slave trade. Thereafter the Dutch recruited indentured labourers from the British Raj (Indian subcontinent) via an arrangement with the British, the Dutch East Indies and China. Unlike other Asian population groups, migrants from the Middle East, mainly Maronites from Lebanon but also Syria and Palestine, were not recruited as indentured labourers but migrated later on their own initiative to engage in the textile trade. Most Asian Surinamese have ancestry from those regions of the Asian continent.

The results of a 2012 census in Suriname showed that of the 541,638 residents, 27% are of Indian descent (Hindustani), 14% are Javanese and 13.4% are multiracial. Chinese was not recorded as an ethnic group. Instead people of Chinese descent were grouped in "Other" together with Native American and White. In the 2004 census, 1.8% were Chinese. Between 2004 and 2012 there was a big increase in multiracial people from 12.5% to 17.6%.

== Ancestry ==
According to estimates of the General Statistics Bureau of Suriname, the population was composed of the following groups (2004-2012):

Ethnic group	2004		2012		Growth	
Ethnic group	Amount	%	Amount	%	Amount	%
Marron	72,553	14.7	117,567	21.7	45,014	62.0
Creole	87,202	17.7	84,933	15.7	-2,269	‐2.6
Hindustani	135,117	27.4	148,443	27.4	13,326	9.9
Javanese	71,879	14.6	73,975	13.7	2,096	2.9
Multiracial (mixed)	61,524	12.5	72,340	13.4	10,816	17.6
Other (Chinese, Amerindian, White etc)	31,975 (includes 8,775 Chinese)	6.5	40,985	7.6	9,010	28.2
Unknown	32,579	6.6	3,395	0.6	-29,184	‐89.6
Total	492,829	100	541,638	100.0	48,809	9.9

== Subgroups ==
- Indo-Surinamese
- Javanese Surinamese
- Chinese Surinamese
