= Guyanese people =

South American ethnic group

- Flag of Guyana

Total population
- c. 1,250,000

Regions with significant populations
- Guyana 816,800
- United States: 323,052
- Canada: 84,275
- United Kingdom: 40,872
- Netherlands: 14,560-2,427
- Suriname: 11,530
- Venezuela: 7,401
- Antigua and Barbuda: 6,811
- Barbados: 6,657
- Trinidad and Tobago: 4,647
- Spain: 5,197
- Brazil: 2,549
- Saint Lucia: 2,111
- French Guiana: 4,000
- Sint Maarten: 2,000

Languages
- English, Guyanese Creole, Guyanese Hindustani, Tamil, Chinese, Portuguese, Spanish, Dutch, French, Indigenous languages

Religion
- Christianity (Roman Catholicism and Protestantism), Hinduism, Islam, Rastafari, Baháʼí, Buddhism, Afro-American religions, Traditional African religions, Chinese folk religion (Taoism and Confucianism), Amerindian folk beliefs

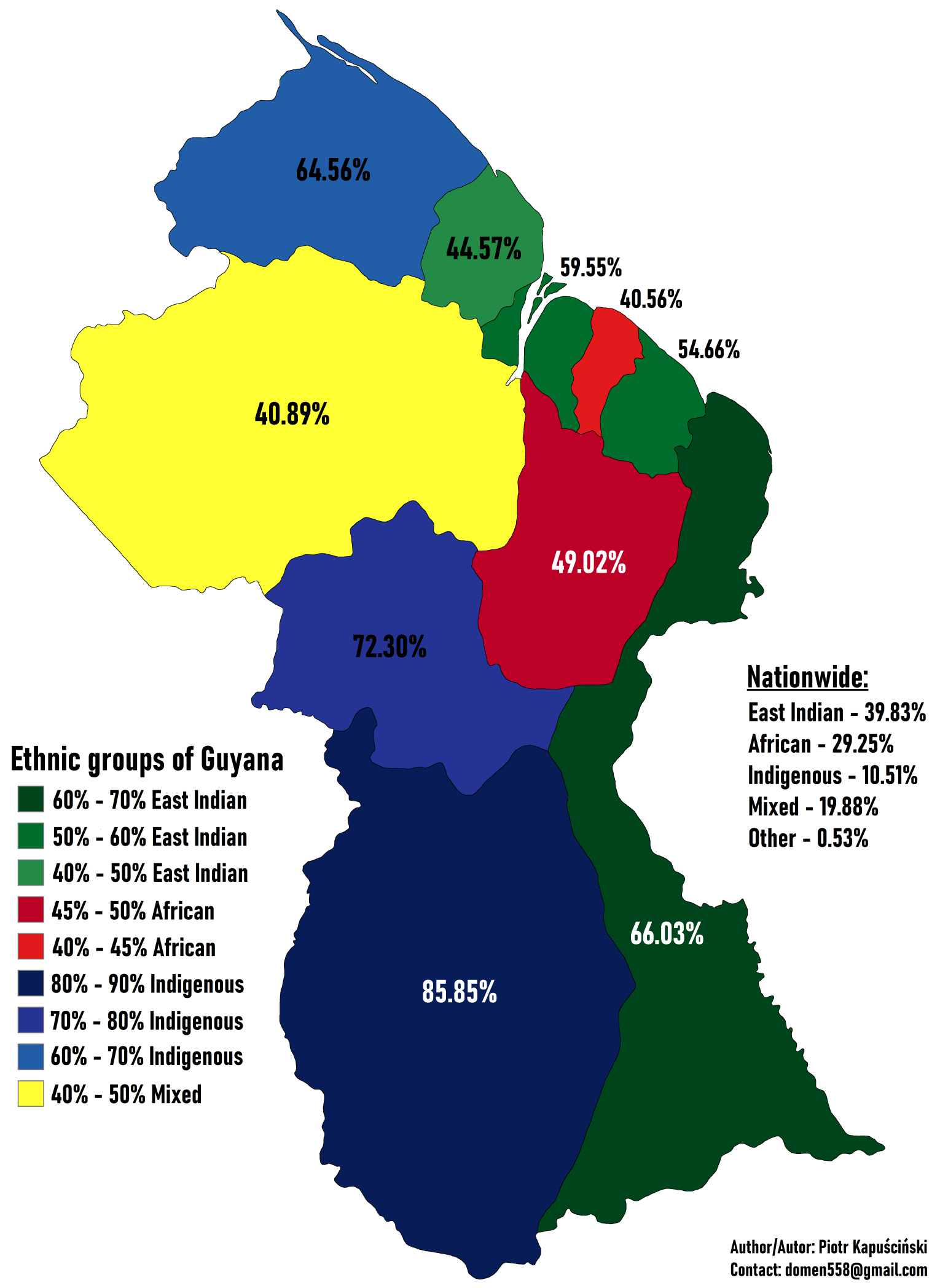
Distribution of the ethnic groups in Guyana according to the 2012 census

The Guyanese people are citizens and nationals of Guyana. They come from a wide array of backgrounds and cultures including aboriginal natives, African and Indian origins, as well as a minority of Chinese and European descendant peoples. Demographics as of 2012 are Indo-Guyanese 39.83%, Afro-Guyanese 29.25%, mixed race (mostly Dougla) 19.88%, Amerindian 10.51%, other 0.53% (including Chinese and Europeans, such as the Portuguese). As a result, Guyanese do not equate their nationality with race and ethnicity, but with citizenship. Although citizens make up the majority of Guyanese, there is a substantial number of Guyanese expatriates, dual citizens and descendants living worldwide, chiefly elsewhere in the Anglosphere.

Located on the northern coast of South America, Guyana is part of the main land Caribbean which is part of the historical British West Indies. It is culturally similar to Suriname and nearby island nations of the Caribbean such as Trinidad and Tobago, and is a culturally Caribbean country even though it is not an island nation located in the Caribbean Sea.

The national anthem of Guyana, Dear Land of Guyana, of Rivers and Plains, refers to Guyana as the "Land of six peoples" which was historically considered to be made up of African, Indian, Chinese, Portuguese, British, and Amerindian people.

== Demographics ==
Even though referred to collectively as Amerindians, the Indigenous peoples in Guyana are made up of several distinct tribes or nations. Warao, Lokono, Kalina, and Wapishana are all represented in Guyana.

Europeans arrived in the Guianas in the search for gold in the New World, eventually settling in and colonizing Guyana and the Americas. Starting with the Dutch, then English, the cultural presence of Europe has been a significant force in the country even though the population was always in the minority. French and Spanish also have a presence in the region.

The climate of Guyana was deemed suitable for growing sugar cane, sparking a demand for labour unmet by the Europeans themselves or the local Amerindians, so slaves from Africa were brought into the country. The high mortality and low birthrate of plantation slavery was supplemented by bringing in more enslaved people until the slave trade was abolished in 1838. Indentured labour contracts were made for Portuguese and Chinese people, but the largest numbers came from India.

The diversity of the country is a point of pride as well as a challenge; conflicts along racial lines have been a source of significant social tension. Racism in Guyana has roots in the control of labour, so that plantation owners could maintain a stratified society of subservient workers and limit competition for the highest social class. Many segments of society are divided by race, such as religion, politics, even industries.

== Language ==
WIKITONGUES- Sandra speaking English and Guyanese Creole

Guyana's culture reflects its European history as it was colonized by both the Dutch and French before becoming a British colony. Guyana (known as British Guiana under British colonial rule), gained its independence from the United Kingdom in 1966 and subsequently became a republic in 1970. As a result of Guyana's 170-year history as a British colony, it is a part of the Anglophone world and part of the Anglophone Caribbean – a subregion of the Caribbean consisting of independent, English-speaking nations that were once British colonies (also known as the Commonwealth Caribbean). Even as the only English-speaking country in South America, the majority of people in Guyana speak Guyanese Creole informally. Standard English, i.e. British English spelling and pronunciation, is used for all business and education and is typically consistently spoken by members of the upper and upper-middle class.

== See also ==
- Culture of Guyana
- Guyanese Canadians
- Guyanese community in Toronto
- Women of Guyana
- History of Guyana
- Guyanese Americans
- Indigenous peoples in Guyana
- Portuguese Guyanese
