= List of Guyanese Canadians =

Canadians of Guyanese birth or descent

Guyanese Canadians
Total population
- 100,000

Regions with significant populations
- Ontario (including the Greater Toronto Area and National Capital Region), Quebec, Manitoba, Alberta and British Columbia

Languages
- English, Guyanese Creole, Guyanese Hindustani

Religion
- Christianity, Hinduism, Islam, Obeah

Related ethnic groups
- Indo-Canadians, Chinese Canadians, Black Canadians

Guyanese Canadians are Canadian citizens of Guyanese descent or Guyana-born persons who reside in Canada.

The following are notable Canadians of Guyanese descent:

== Notable Guyanese Canadians ==
=== Entertainers ===
- Anjulie - singer
- Dave Baksh - lead guitarist for the band Sum 41 (now Brown Brigade)
- Deborah Cox - singer
- Simone Denny - singer
- Melanie Fiona - singer
- Keysha Freshh - rapper
- Nicole Holness - singer and TV host
- JDiggz - rapper
- Vaughn Lal - bassist and backing vocalist for band Brown Brigade
- Rich London - rapper
- Shakira Baksh - fashion model and actress
- Maestro Fresh Wes - rapper and actor
- More or Les - rapper and DJ
- Saukrates - rapper and hip hop producer
- Melinda Shankar - actress, television series Degrassi: The Next Generation
- Eon Sinclair - bassist for the band Bedouin Soundclash
- Maiko Watson - former member of Sugar Jones
- Roy Woods - rapper and singer
- P Reign now known as Preme - rapper
- Priyanka - drag queen, winner of the first season of Canada's Drag Race

=== Arts ===
- Sonnet L'Abbé - author and poet
- Yolanda T. Marshall - author

=== Politics ===
- James Douglas - Governor of Vancouver Island and Governor of British Columbia.
- James W. Douglas - British Columbia MLA
- Ovid Jackson - former Liberal Party Member of Parliament and former Mayor of Owen Sound
- Victor Quelch - Social Credit Party of Canada Member of Parliament for Acadia
- John Rodriguez - former New Democratic Party Member of Parliament for Nickel Belt and former Mayor of Sudbury
- Mark Persaud - Liberal Party of Canada National Executive Liberal Party of Canada - twice elected

=== Sports ===
- Charles Allen - hurdler and sprinter
- Troy Amos-Ross - boxer
- Andreas Athanasiou - ice hockey player
- Natasha Bacchus - deaf athlete
- Sheridon Baptiste - bobsledder, sprinter, Canadian football player
- Ian Beckles - American football player
- Alex Bunbury - soccer player
- Laura Creavalle - Guyanese-born Canadian/American professional bodybuilder
- Keevil Daly - weightlifter
- Ian Danney - bobsledder
- Nicholas de Groot - first-class cricketer
- Dwayne De Rosario - soccer player
- Sunil Dhaniram - first-class cricketer
- Philip Edwards - Olympic sprinter 1928, 1932, 1936; five-time Olympic medalist
- Nicolette Fernandes - squash player
- Gary Holmes - wrestler
- Lawrence Holmes - wrestler
- Charmaine Hooper - soccer player
- Lyndon Hooper - soccer player
- Priscilla Lopes-Schliep - hurdler
- Egerton Marcus - boxer
- Mark McKoy - hurdler
- Jaime Peters - soccer player
- Danny Ramnarais - first-class cricketer
- Quillan Roberts, soccer player
- Abdool Samad - first-class cricketer
- Walter Spence - swimmer
- Paul Stalteri - soccer player
- Stella Umeh - gymnast

=== Business ===
- Shawn Allen - Founder Matrix Mortgage Global, 2022 Scarborough Walk Of Fame Inductee

=== Guyanese Canadians by Canadian province or territory (2016) ===
Province	Population	Percentage	Source
Ontario	73,360	0.6%	
Quebec	3,670	0.1%	
Alberta	3,095	0.1%	
British Columbia	1,930	0.0%	
Manitoba	1,480	0.1%	
Nova Scotia	355	0.0%	
Saskatchewan	185	0.0%	
New Brunswick	120	0.0%	
Newfoundland and Labrador	55	0.0%	
Prince Edward Island	10	0.1%	
Northwest Territories	0	0.0%	
Nunavut	0	0.0%	
Yukon	10	0.0%	
Canada	84,275	0.3%	

== See also ==
- Guyanese people
- Caribbean Canadians
- Indo-Canadians
- Chinese Canadians
- Guyanese Americans
- Guyanese in the United Kingdom
