= Japanese settlement in the Dominican Republic =

Japanese expatriates and Japanese descendants in the Dominican Republic
Total population
- Figures as of October 2024: 749 Japanese citizens c. 800 Japanese descendants

Regions with significant populations
- Constanza, Jarabacoa, Dajabón, Manzanillo Port, Neiba, Duvergé, Altagracia (Pedernales), Aguas Negras (Pedernales)

Languages
- Japanese, Dominican Spanish, Frespañol

Religion
- Roman Catholicism and Buddhism

Related ethnic groups
- Japanese Caribbeans

Japanese Dominicans (Spanish: Dominicanos Japoneses) are Dominican citizens of Japanese origin. Japan's Ministry of Foreign Affairs estimates the Japanese descended population in the country at roughly 800. As of October 2024, there were also 749 Japanese nationals in the Dominican Republic. These consist of both the settlers who have retained their Japanese citizenship and more recent expatriate residents. The Dominican Republic has the largest Japanese population in the Caribbean and Central American region.

== Migration history ==
Migration from Japan to the Dominican Republic did not begin until after World War II. With the end of the Allied occupation, Japan regained control over its migration policy. The Dominican Republic signed a treaty with Japan in 1956 to accept migrants for agricultural labour, one of the earliest in a series of treaties signed by Japan's newly established emigration bureau. From the Japanese government's perspective, the goal of the emigration policy was to improve Japan's international reputation by having Japanese people contribute to the development of foreign countries. Latin America was the only potential outlet for emigration; the United States' Gentlemen's Agreement of 1907 and Immigration Act of 1924 and Australia's White Australia policy eliminated the option of settlement in those two countries, while anti-Japanese sentiment in Asia due to Japan's wartime atrocities meant that none of those countries would accept Japanese migrants either. Rafael Trujillo, dictator of the Dominican Republic since 1930, for his part sought to use European and later Japanese migrants as a demographic buffer against black Haitian squatters, by settling them along the country's western border with Haiti.

The Japanese migrants came to the Dominican Republic with the intention of permanent settlement in the country. They had been promised furnished houses, land ready for planting, and credit until the first harvest. More than 200 families totaling 1,319 people braved the month-long ocean voyage and arrived from 1956 to 1959. However, the May 1961 assassination of Rafael Trujillo and a subsequent civil war, plunged the country into chaos and political violence, leaving many of the governmental promises of assistance and protection broken. The migrants entirely abandoned five of their eight settlements. Beginning in 1961, 70 families fled to other Latin American countries which had agreed with the Japanese government to resettle them, including Brazil, Argentina, and Bolivia, while 111 other families returned to Japan.

Japanese settlement in the Dominican Republic never grew to a very large scale; protests over the extreme hardships and broken government promises faced by the initial group of migrants set the stage for the end of state-supported labour emigration in Japan. By 1962, just 276 Japanese remained in the country. Of the forty-seven families which settled in Constanza and the nearby valley, just seven remained. However, they clung tenuously to their land, improving irrigation facilities and introducing the Japanese bokashi composting technique. By the 1990s, Constanza had become a major area of agricultural production, growing over 90% of the country's vegetables. There is monument dedicated to the Japanese immigration in the Paseo Presidente Bellini. It is a statue of a man, a woman holding a baby on her back and a child looking at the front. You can find a stone with the names of Japanese immigrants.

== Political implications ==
The failure of migration to the Dominican Republic marked an important turning point in Japanese emigration policy. Along with rising wages in Japan due to labour shortages, the widespread reporting of the tragedy faced by emigrants to the Dominican Republic dampened popular and official enthusiasm for emigration; the total number of emigrants from Japan fell by nearly two-thirds from 1961 to 1962, and in 1968, Japan's Ministry of Foreign Affairs finally abolished its Central-South America Emigration Bureau. Backlash would continue for decades; in 2000, more than 170 of the migrants sued the Japanese government, charging that it lied to them about conditions in the Dominican Republic in order to trick them into leaving Japan. The Japanese government settled the lawsuit in July 2006, paying US$17,000 to each plaintiff as well as US$10,000 to non-plaintiff migrants; then-Prime Minister of Japan Junichiro Koizumi made a formal statement apologising for the "immense suffering due to the government's response at the time".

According to Japanese diplomat Teruyuki Ishikawa, the presence of the remaining Japanese immigrants and their descendants is the major reason why the Dominican Republic is the biggest recipient of official development aid from Japan.

== Language and culture ==
Some of the initial Japanese migrants to the Dominican Republic still speak little Spanish. Their spoken Japanese is also full of archaisms, such as the Sino-Japanese-derived shashinki (写真機) instead of the modern loanword kamera (カメラ) for "camera".

== Education ==
The Colegio Japones de Santo Domingo is a supplementary Japanese education program in Santo Domingo.

== Notable individuals ==
- Akari Endo, actress
