= Japanese Caribbean people =

Ethnic group in the Caribbean

Regions with significant populations
- Dominican Republic: 1,673
- Cuba: 1,100

Languages
- English · Spanish · Japanese

Religion
- Buddhism · Shinto · Roman Catholicism

Related ethnic groups
- Japanese Brazilians · Japanese Peruvians, Asian Caribbeans
- Figures above are Ministry of Foreign Affairs estimates of the number of local citizens of Japanese descent and do not include Japanese expatriates.

Japanese Caribbean people are people of Japanese ethnic origin living in the Caribbean. There are small but significant populations of Japanese people and their descendants living in Cuba, the Dominican Republic, and Jamaica.

== Sub-groups ==
Caribbean Islands:

- Japanese Cubans
- Japanese settlement in the Dominican Republic
- Japanese expatriates in Jamaica

Mainland Caribbean:

- Japanese migration to Colombia
- Japanese Brazilians

== See also ==
- Afro-Caribbean people
- Chinese Caribbean people
- Indo-Caribbean people
- White Caribbean people
- Japanese Brazilians
- Japanese Peruvians
