= Asian Caymanians =

Total population
- 7,420 (2022) 9.1% of the Cayman Islands population

Regions with significant populations
- George Town

Languages
- English; Tagalog; Hindi; Tamil; Thai; Chinese

Religion
- Predominantly: Catholicism; Hinduism; Folk religions; Minority: Islam; Sikhism; Buddhism

Asian Caymanians refers to citizens of the Cayman Islands with Asian ancestry, primarily those with Filipino or Indian ancestry. It may also refer to Asian immigrants new to the Cayman Islands. Asian cultures and influence in the islands is relatively new, as many Asian immigrants started to relocate to the islands in the late 1990s.
