= Mark Persaud =

Canadian lawyer, entrepreneur, civic leader, & public figure

Mark M. Persaud
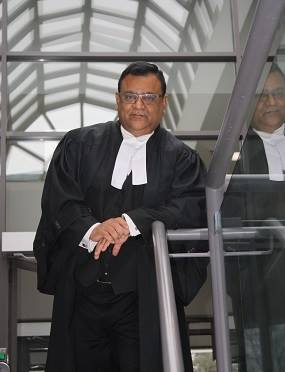
- Born: Guyana
- Occupation: Lawyer
- Employer: Persaud Law Group Professional Corporation

Mark Mahindra Persaud is a Canadian lawyer and civic leader. He is a former federal prosecutor.

== Childhood and education ==
Persaud was born in British Guiana (now Guyana). He challenged the government of Guyana, and as a result of his political activities and a fear of reprisals, Persaud's family sent him to Canada where he lived as a homeless man in Toronto. He was rescued by the Scott Mission, a Christian outreach organization. Thereafter he volunteered at charitable organizations as he was legally unable to work.

Persaud attended Osgoode Hall Law School in Toronto and graduated in 1991. In June, 2016 he received an honorary Doctor of Laws LL.D. from the Law Society of Upper Canada.

== Legal career ==
Persaud worked as a federal prosecutor at the Department of Justice where he practiced in various roles, including a secondment to the RCMP's Integrated Proceeds of Crime. During his time at the Department of Justice, Persaud claims he was treated like an articling student and given menial work. He asserts that discrimination prevented him from being promoted. He quit the Department of Justice in 2003 over allegations of racism.

From 2003 to 2010, Persaud did not practice law. He returned to the non governmental sector. In 2010, he joined the firm Steinberg Title Hope & Israel LLP as litigation counsel. In 2011, Persaud started his own law firm, Persaud Law Group Professional Corporation.

In 2025, the Law Society of Ontario commenced proceedings against Persaud for breach of the Rules of Professional Conduct for, amongst other things, for failing to respond and to cooperate with the Law Society of Ontario in its investigationsduring a period when he was ill and off work.

Also, the Law Society of Ontario commenced a second prosecution against Persaud for his failure to communicate with a former employee and with opposing counsel and employees and judges of the Superior Court of Ontario in a civil manner, whom he contends treated him and his client in discriminatory manner including allowing while male lawyers to submit fraudulent reports from overseas.

As part of his anti-discrimination advocacy, he is currently in an adversarial relationship with employees at the Law Society of Ontario for refusing to protect his client from racism and misogyny and for protecting white lawyers from serious misconduct including submitting fraudulent reports to the court consistent with the recent report of racism in the Nova Scotia Bar.

He continues his human rights and social justice advocacy including focusing on anti discrimination against women and minorities.

== Politics ==
Persaud was a member of the national Liberal executive and served as an Advisor to a Federal Cabinet Minister. As a result of internal disagreements he left the Liberal Party of Canada and publicly supported the Conservative Party of Canada.

== Awards and recognitions ==
in 2009, Persaud was nominated as a finalist in Canadian Immigrant Magazine's Top 25 Canadian Immigrants of 2009 award. Persaud was reportedly "flattered" to be considered as one of "Canada's top immigrants".

Persaud received the Osgoode Hall Law School Alumni Public Sector Gold Key Award for Public Law in 2007.

He was nominated by the diplomatic community for the 2006 Seoul Peace Prize and recognized by The Law Society of Ontario as an exceptional lawyer (1941–present) as part of their Lawyers Make History Project.

In June 2016, the Law Society of Ontario Canada conferred upon him the degree of Doctor of Laws honoris causa (LLD).

== Human rights ==
Persaud publicly alleged racism and discrimination at the Department of Justice when he was invited to testify before the Standing Senate Committee on Human Rights.

Persaud was a volunteer architect of the Canadian International Peace Project, an organization which attempted to rebuild mosques in Afghanistan after the 2001 terrorist attacks in the United States. Persaud claims his involvement with this organization caused him ill treatment by the Department of Justice.

In 2020, he was appointed the inaugural Chair of the Justice Committee of the Black North Initiative.

As part of his anti-discrimination advocacy, he is currently in an adversarial relationship with employees at the Law Society of Ontario for refusing to protect his client from racism and misogyny and for protecting white lawyers from fraudulent conduct including submitting fraudulent reports to the court consistent with the recent report of racism in the Nova Scotia Bar.

== Community leader ==
Persaud has assisted refugees and other vulnerable and disadvantaged persons. He is the Founder and former President of the Canadian International Peace Project (CIPP), an organization that promotes inter-community goodwill through building relationships between diverse national, ethnic, religious, and community organizations. Persaud also led the multi-faith international Afghan Project and the Canadian Jewish-Somali Mentorship Project.

He is the Founding President of the Canadian Guyanese Congress and the Founder of the World Guyanese Congress - see url-https://www.wgc-org.com.
