= Surinamese people =

People who identify with the country of Suriname

Surinamers (Dutch) Srananman (Sranan Tongo)
- Flag of Suriname

Total population
- c. 1,000,000

Regions with significant populations
- Suriname: 612,985
- Netherlands: 349,978
- France: 32,412 (Note: Mainly French Guiana)
- Belgium: 20,000
- United States: 14,555
- Guyana: 4,662
- Aruba: 3,000
- Curaçao: 2,000
- Canada: 1,005
- Indonesia: 1,000
- Austria: 1,000

Languages
- Dutch · Sranan Tongo (Note: As Surinamese is primarily a national identity made up of various ethnic and religious groups, a large number of mutually unintelligible languages are spoken in the country and by the Surinamese diaspora. Other than Dutch and Sranan Tongo, these are not spoken by the majority but rather only within the racial or ethnic minority group, even though Sranan Tongo is mostly spoken by the Creoles. Dutch, as the language of law, education, media and business, and Sranan Tongo, as the most widely spoken vernacular.) · Sarnami Hindustani · Surinamese-Javanese · Hakka Chinese · Cantonese · Hokkien · Mandarin · Lebanese Arabic · Brazilian Portuguese · English · various other languages

Religion
- Christianity · Hinduism · Islam · Winti · Kejawèn · Chinese folk religion (incl. Taoism and Confucianism) · Buddhism · Indigenous Amerindian religion · Irreligious

Surinamese people (Sranan Tongo: Srananman), also known as Surinamers, are people who identify with the country of Suriname. This connection may be residential, legal, historical or cultural. For most Surinamese, several (or all) of these connections exist and are collectively the source of their being Surinamese.

Suriname is a multiethnic and multilingual society, home to people of various ethnic, racial, religious, and national origins, with the majority of the population made up of Old World immigrants and their descendants. As a result, the Surinamese do not equate their nationality with ethnicity, but with citizenship and allegiance to Suriname. Aside from the indigenous population, nearly all Surinamese or their ancestors arrived since the Age of Discovery and establishment of the colony of Surinam, primarily from Africa, Europe and Asia.

== Ethnic groups ==
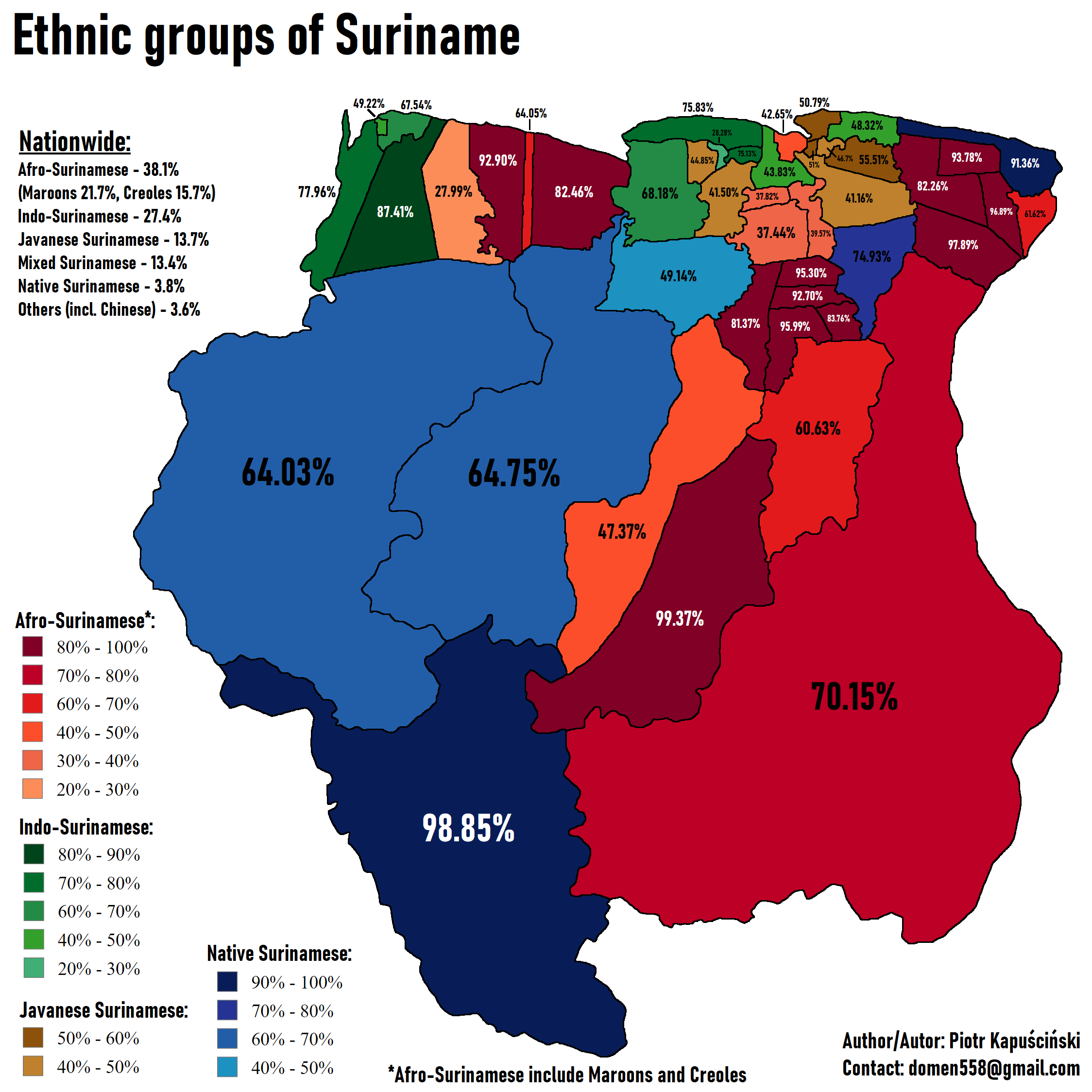
Map of ethnic groups in Suriname according to the 2012 census

The population of Suriname is made up of various distinguishable ethnic groups:

- Indigenous Surinamese, the original inhabitants of Suriname, form 3.8% of the population. The main groups are the Akurio, Arawak, Kalina (Caribs), Tiriyó and Wayana.
- Afro-Surinamese form about 37% of the population, and are usually divided into two groups:
  - The Creoles (15.7%). These are descendants of enslaved Africans who also have some admixture from the Northern European (mostly Dutch), Spanish, Portuguese and Jewish colonists.
  - The Maroons (21.7%). These are descendants of enslaved Africans who managed to escape and set up a living in the Amazon jungle. The two main Maroon tribes are the Aukan and Saramaccans. Other smaller tribes include the Aluku, Paramaccan, Kwinti and Matawai tribe.
- Asian Surinamese form about 43% of the population, and are divided into multiple groups:
  - Indo-Surinamese form 27% of the population. They are descendants of 19th-century indentured workers from British India, who came to work on the sugar estates of Surinam. They are mostly from present-day Bihar, Bengal, Jharkhand, and Uttar Pradesh, in Northern India.
  - Javanese Surinamese, descendants of indentured workers from the Dutch East Indies (present Indonesia) on the island of Java, form 14% of the population.
  - Chinese Surinamese, mainly descendants of the earliest 19th-century indentured workers. The 1990s and early 21st century saw renewed immigration on a large scale. In the year 2011 there were over 40,000 Chinese in Suriname.
  - Lebanese Surinamese, primarily Maronites from Lebanon, Syria and Palestine.
- European Surinamese make up 1% of the Surinamese population:
  - The Boeroes (derived from boer, the Dutch word for "farmer") make up the largest group of European Surinamese. They are descendants of 19th-century immigrant Dutch farmers.
  - The Portuguese Surinamese from Madeira are descendants of indentured workers from Madeira in 1853.
- Jews of Sephardic and Ashkenazi origin. In their history, Jodensavanne plays a major role. Many Jews are mixed with other ethnicities.
- Multiracial Surinamese form 13.4% of the Surinamese population.

== Population ==
Most of the inhabitants live in the north of the country, in the districts of Paramaribo, Wanica and Nickerie. The least populated county is Sipaliwini, which covers most of the nation's interior and is sparsely inhabited. More than half of the population lives in and around the capital.

== Emigration ==
Migration to the Netherlands began during the colonial era. Initially, this was mainly the colonial elite, but expanded during the 1920s and 1930s to include other inhabitants looking for better education, employment, or other opportunities.

Approximately 350,000 individuals of Surinamese descent now live in the Netherlands, with mass migration beginning in the years leading up to Suriname's independence in 1975, and continuing during military rule in the 1980s and for largely economic reasons extended throughout the 1990s. Other emigration destinations include French Guiana, the United States, Aruba, Curaçao, Belgium, Canada, Indonesia and Guyana.

== Languages ==
In Suriname, there are no fewer than twenty languages spoken. Most Surinamese are multilingual. In terms of numbers of speakers are the main languages in Suriname, successively the Dutch language, Sranan Tongo (Surinamese Creole), Sarnami (Surinamese Hindustani), Surinamese-Javanese, and different Maroon languages (especially Saramaccan and Aukan). Since most Surinamese people are multilingual (for instance Dutch and Sranan Tongo), the society functions as a diglossia, where Dutch is the standardized and formal prestige register and Sranan Tongo generally the informal street vernacular. Dutch serves as the language of law, government, business, media and education.

According to the results of the seventh general population and housing census, which was held in 2004, Dutch is the most spoken home language in the country, at around 60% of the population speaking it at home. A further 24% of the population speaks Dutch as a second language. Sranan Tongo, is spoken primarily as a second language in 46% of households, along with 22% Sarnami Hindustani and 11% Javanese.

== Religion ==
The following religious statistics have been reported as of 2012:

- 48.4% Christianity (26.8% Protestant and 21.6% Roman Catholic)
- 22.3% Hinduism (Sanatani and Arya Samaj)
- 13.9% Islam (Sunni, Shia, and Ahmadiyya)
- 4.7% Other
- 10.7% None

== See also ==
- Culture of Suriname
- Surinamese people in the Netherlands
- Surinamese people in Belgium
- Surinamese Americans
- Women in Suriname
- History of Suriname
