= Japanese Cubans =

日系キューバ人 Nikkeikyubajin Japonés Cubanos

Total population
- 90 Japanese nationals 1,200 people of Japanese descent

Regions with significant populations
- Havana, Isla de la Juventud

Languages
- Cuban Spanish, Japanese

Related ethnic groups
- Japanese diaspora

Japanese Cubans (Japanese: 日系キューバ人) are people of Japanese ancestry resident in Cuba.

== History ==
The Cuban government first sought to recruit Japanese workers into sugar plantations in the 1880s, but the Japanese government refused to give approval on the grounds of the terrible working conditions of Chinese workers in Cuba. Subsequently, the first recorded Japanese person to settle in Cuba was in 1903. The first larger group of arrivals came from Mexico between 1910 and 1916, which would set a pattern for later decades, who were fleeing violence during the Mexican Revolution.

They established an agricultural society in Carmelina. Later in 1916, 262 Japanese arrived. Most decided to get a job by harvesting cane. But the conditions were very hard for the Japanese and some returned to Japan. Some made it to the Isle of Youth, where some families established fruit and vegetable farms. In 1926, immigration to Cuba slowed.

On December 9, 1941, after Japan attacked Pearl Harbor, President Batista declared war on Japan, along with its fascist allies. A few days later, on December 12, all Japanese descendants living in Cuba were declared "enemy aliens". As of 1943 a total of about 1,200 Japanese had immigrated to Cuba, including about 200 Okinawans. Most Japanese Cubans were arrested by the Cuban government and were deported to the United States. Some found new jobs when they arrived. Some worked as cooks, servants and other forms of support. Those who were imprisoned were not necessarily released immediately when the war ended. The last group was released in March 1946, over six months after Japan surrendered. After World War II, some left for Japan.

During the Cuban Revolution, more nikkei left Cuba for Japan.

== Contemporary situation ==
In 2008, the Japanese government conferred the Order of the Rising Sun with gold and silver rays on Francisco Shinichi Miyasaka Machida in recognition of his contribution to the welfare of the descendants of Japanese emigrants in Cuba.

In 2019, there were an estimated 1,200 Japanese descendants living in Cuba.

== See also ==
- Cuba–Japan relations
- Japanese diaspora
- Immigration to Cuba
