= Indonesians in the Netherlands =

Indonesiërs in Nederland (Dutch)

Total population
- 13,000

Languages
- Indonesian, Dutch

Religion
- Islam

The most significant Dutch colony was the Dutch East Indies, in present-day Indonesia. After World War II and the subsequent Indonesian National Revolution, the Dutch Indies became the independent Republic of Indonesia in 1949. Following independence, hundreds of thousands of people of Dutch and mixed Dutch-Indonesian heritage relocated to the Netherlands, forming the largest migrant group in the Netherlands.

== See also ==
- Indonesia–Netherlands relations
