= Surinamese Americans =

Americans of Surinamese birth or descent

Total population
- 2,833 (2000 U.S. Census) 10,000 - 15,000 (other estimates)

Regions with significant populations
- New York, Massachusetts, Pennsylvania, Delaware, Maryland, Virginia, North Carolina, Georgia, Florida, Kentucky, Missouri, Iowa, South Dakota, Minnesota, Texas, Washington, Colorado and California

Languages
- English; Dutch; Dunglish; Sranan Tongo; Sarnami Hindustani; Surinamese-Javanese; other Surinamese languages

Religion
- Christianity; Hinduism; Islam; other

Related ethnic groups
- Trinidadian and Tobagonian Americans; Guyanese Americans; Indo-Caribbean Americans; Caribbean Americans; Dutch Americans; African Americans · Indonesian Americans; Chinese Americans

Surinamese Americans (Dutch: Surinaamse Amerikanen) are Americans of Surinamese descent. According to the 2000 U.S. Census, 2,833 people reported Surinamese ancestry.

== History ==
The Surinamese immigrant Jan Ernst Matzeliger worked in Lynn, Massachusetts, developing and patenting an automated lasting machine in 1883 that was essential for the mechanization of shoemaking, immediately improving quality, halving prices, and ending the previously necessary putting-out system.

A substantial Surinamese community in United States has existed since at least 1975. For much of the 20th century, many Surinamese immigrants moved to the U.S. via a permanent residency visa, which enabled them to acquire U.S. citizenship. However, it became easier to immigrate to the U.S. because of the open door policy the U.S. had for many refugees. Some Surinamese were political refugees that fled the Bouterse regime.

Surinamese have immigrated to the U.S. due to both push and pull factors. Although many migrate to the U.S. to escape poverty, many have migrated for work, study, and tourism. Thus, many Surinamese who traveled to the U.S. with tourist purposes to study at their universities, definitely settled there. Most Surinamese that settled in U.S. cities were lower and middle-class individuals who arrived from the late 1980s to the early 1990s. Also, Surinamese families already being in some U.S. cities boosted further emigration from Suriname.

== Demography ==
Most Surinamese organizations estimate that about 10,000 to 15,000 Surinamese live in the United States. Most Surinamese Americans reside in South Florida and New York City. Other places with relatively large Surinamese communities include but are not limited to Washington; Atlanta, Georgia; California (primarily San Francisco); and other cities in Florida. Most Surinamese settle in places similar to their land, from residential architectural style to flora and fauna to tropical climate. For that reason, the highest concentrations of Surinamese are in Florida (Miami, Orlando, Fort Lauderdale, Fort Myers, Sarasota and Tampa.) Most Surinamese in the U.S. are of Chinese, East Indian, Creole, and mixed descent. Trace amounts of other Suriname ethnicities are also represented in the U.S. Some Surinamese in the U.S. are also white (especially those of Dutch descent) and some are of Javanese, Amerindian, and/or Maroon descent. The racial variety in the Surinamese community is displayed especially in New York City. The Surinamese community experiences disunity and mistrust among other issues. The Surinamese community of New York is more tightly knit than that of Florida.

== Organizations ==
Most organizations try to maintain the identity of Surinamese cultures, particularly Indian, Creole, and Javanese, organizing many activities and events throughout the year. Florida contains all these organizations, and all but one operate in Miami—the Surinamese Moravian Fellowship of Miami, Surjawa, the Organization of Surinamese people in Miami (OSIM), the Surinamese American Network Incorporation (SANI), the Surinam Heritage Foundation, Heri Heri, and Fayalobi (the only one in Tampa.)

The Surinamese Moravian Church in Miami tries to promote social unity through Christian faith and organization of events.

== Notable people ==
- Sergiño Dest, soccer player
- Otto Huiswoud, political activist
- Ryan Leslie, singer
- Robert Van Lierop, lawyer, film director, diplomat, activist and writer
- Maurice Ligeon, soccer player
- Jacques Judah Lyons, rabbi
- Vinoodh Matadin, fashion photographer
- Jan Ernst Matzeliger, inventor
- Felipe Enrique Neri, Baron de Bastrop, businessman and land owner
- Yosh Nijman, American football player
- Jimmy Smits, actor
- DJ Sun, musician
- Corliss Waitman, American football player

== See also ==
- Suriname–United States relations
