= Asian Caribbean people =

Caribbeans with Asian ancestry

Total population
- 2,500,000+

Languages
- Colonial Languages: English; Spanish; French; Dutch; Portuguese; Asian Languages: Caribbean Hindustani; Standard Hindustani (Hindi-Urdu); Tamil; Sindhi; Gujarati; Punjabi; Bengali; Telugu; Hindi; Sinhala; Maldivian; other South Asian languages; Mandarin; Hokkien; Cantonese; Hakka; Javanese; Japanese; Tagalog; Tetum; Thai; Khmer; Lao; Vietnamese; Burmese; Tibetan; Dzongkha; Mongolian; Hmong; Korean; Arabic; Persian

Religion
- Predominantly: Hinduism; Islam (including Sunni and Shia); Buddhism; Chinese folk religions (including Confucianism and Taoism); Christianity (including Catholicism and Protestantism); Other Minority: Shinto; Sikhism; Jainism; Zoroastrianism; Judaism; Baháʼí; Kejawèn

Related ethnic groups
- Asian people; Asian Americans; Asian Canadians; British Asians; Asian Africans; Asian Brazilians; Asian Caymanians; Asian Latin Americans

Asian Caribbean people are Caribbean people who trace their full or a partial ancestry to Asia. The majority of the modern Asian Caribbean populations were the result of indentured labourers that were brought to the colonial Caribbean after the abolition of slavery to work in mines, sugar plantations, etc. as replacements of African slaves.

People of Asian Caribbean descent are mainly South Asian and East Asian and additionally may be of other origins including South East Asian and West Asian.

Besides the colonial languages, some Asian Caribbean people where able to preserve their languages. The Asian Caribbean diaspora is also spread throughout western countries such as Canada, The Netherlands, The United Kingdom and The United States. Asian Caribbeans don't have a predominant religion and are mainly divided between religions such as Hinduism, Islam, Buddhism and Christianity.

== Sub-Groups ==
- Chinese Caribbean people
- Indo-Caribbean people
- Japanese Caribbean people
- Korean Caribbean people
- Arab Caribbean people
- Javanese & Hmong people in French Guiana
