= Mayor of Madiun =

- Wali Kota Madiun
- Coat of arms of Madiun

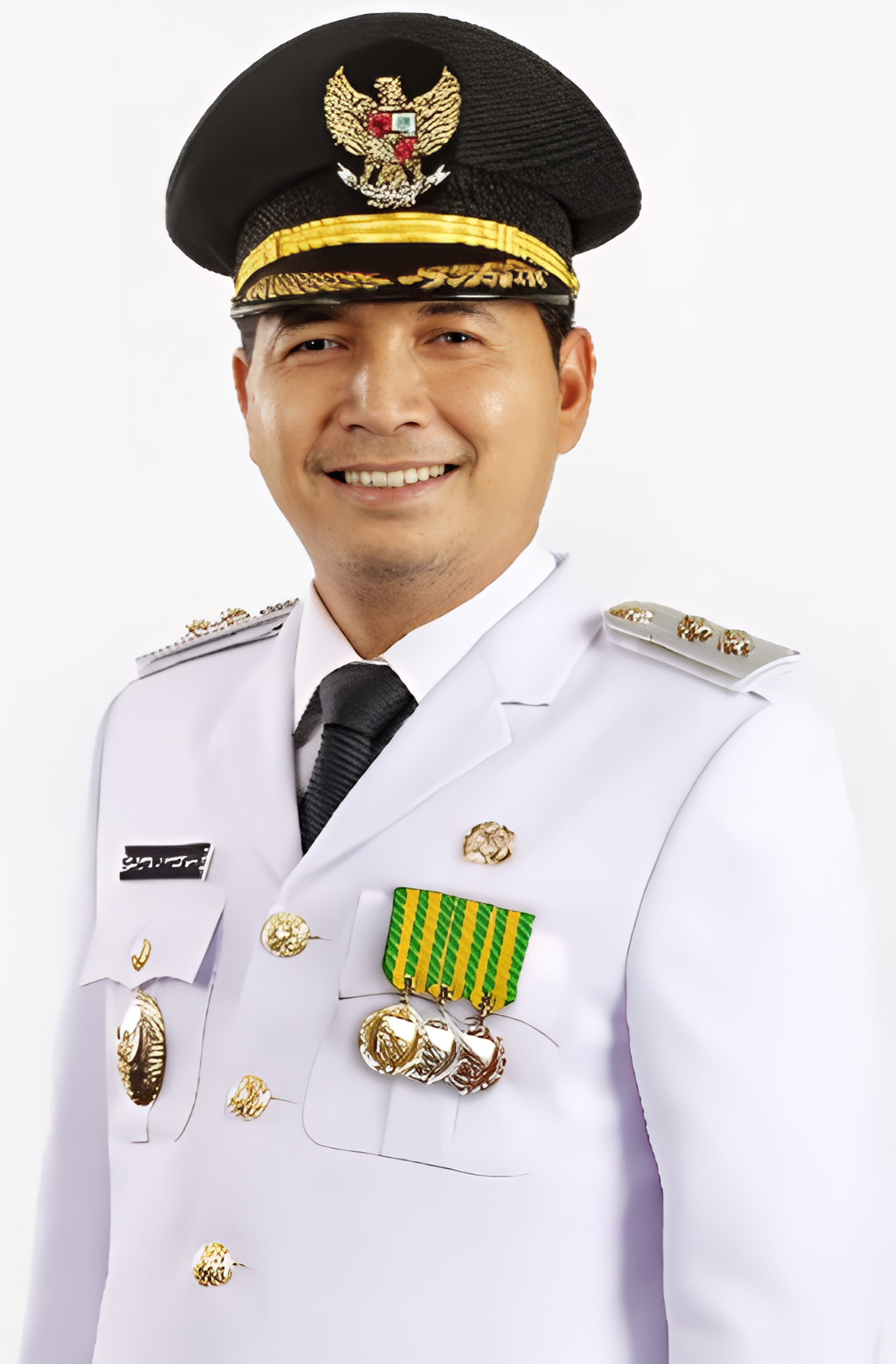
- Incumbent; F. Bagus Panuntun (Acting Officer) since 21 January 2026
- Term length: 5 years
- Inaugural holder: W. M. Ingenlijf
- Website: Official website

Mayor of Madiun is the head of the second-level region who holds the government in Madiun together with the Vice Mayor and 30 members of the Madiun City Regional House of Representatives. The mayor and vice mayor of Madiun are elected through general elections held every 5 years. The first mayor of Madiun was W. M. Ingenlijf.

== List ==
The following is a list of the names of the Mayors of Madiun from time to time.

Dutch East Indies Period
Num.	Portrait	Mayor	Beginning of office	End of Term	Political Party / Faction	Period	Note.	Vice mayor
1		W. M. Ingenlijf			Independent	1		N/A
2		De Maand			Independent	2		N/A
3		Mr. K. A. Schotman			Independent	3		N/A
4		Mr. Boerstra			Independent	4		N/A
5		Mr. Van Dijk			Independent	5		N/A
6		Mr. Ali Sastro Amidjojo			Independent	6		N/A
7		Dr. Mr. R. M. Soebroto			Independent	7		N/A
Mayor of Madiun
Num.	Portrait	Mayor	Beginning of office	End of Term	Political Party / Faction	Period	Note.	Vice mayor
1		Mr. R. Soesanto Tirtoprodjo			Independent	8		N/A
2		Soedibjo			Independent	9		N/A
3		R. Poerbo Sisworo			Independent	10		N/A
4		Soepardi			Independent	11		N/A
5		R. Mochammad			Independent	12		N/A
6		R. M. Soediono			Independent	13		N/A
7		R. Singgih			Independent	14		N/A
8		R. Moetoro			Independent	15		N/A
9		R. Moestadjab			Independent	16		N/A
10		R. Roeslan Wongsokoesoemo			Independent	17		N/A
11		R. Soepardi			Independent	18		N/A
12		Soemadi			Independent	19		N/A
13		Soebagjo			Independent	20		N/A
14		R. Roekito, BA			Independent	21		N/A
15		Drs. Imam Soenardji	13 November 1968	19 January 1974	Independent	22		N/A
16		Achmad Dawaki, BA	19 January 1974	20 January 1979	Independent	23		N/A
17		Drs. Marsoedi	20 January 1979	20 January 1984	Independent	24		N/A
17		Drs. Marsoedi	20 January 1984	20 January 1989	Independent	25		N/A
18		Drs. Masdra M. Jasin	20 January 1989	20 January 1994	Independent	26		N/A
19		Drs. Bambang Pamoedjo	20 January 1994	20 January 1999	Independent	27		N/A
20		Drs. H. Achmad Ali	20 January 1999	29 April 2004	Independent	28		N/A
21		Kokok Raya; S.H., M.Hum.	29 April 2004	29 April 2009	Independent	29		Gandhi Yuninta
22		H. Bambang Irianto; S.H., M.M.	29 April 2009	29 April 2014	Demokrat	30 (2008)		Sugeng Rismiyanto
22		H. Bambang Irianto; S.H., M.M.	29 April 2014	6 December 2016	Demokrat	31 (2013)	(Note: Detained by the KPK since 23 November 2016 because he was named a suspect in a case of alleged acceptance of gratuities while serving as Mayor in the 2009–2014 period related to the construction of the Madiun City Big Market.)	Sugeng Rismiyanto
23		H. Sugeng Rismiyanto; S.H., M.Hum.	21 August 2017	29 April 2019	Independent	31 (2013)		Armaya (2017–2018)
24		Drs. H. Maidi; S.H., M.M., M.Pd.	29 April 2019	29 April 2024	Independent	32 (2018)		Inda Raya Ayu Miko Saputri
24		Drs. H. Maidi; S.H., M.M., M.Pd.	20 February 2025	20 January 2026	Independent	33 (2024)	(Note: Detained by the KPK since 20 January 2026 because he was named a suspect in a case of alleged bribery of projects and CSR funds.)	Bagus Panuntun

== Temporary replacement ==
In the government stack, a regional head who submits himself to leave or temporarily resigns from his position to the central government, then the Minister of Home Affairs prepares a replacement who is a bureaucrat in the regional government or even a vice mayor, including when the mayor's position is in a transition period.

Portrait	Mayor	Party	Beginning	End	Duration	Period	Definitive	Ref.
	Sugeng Rismiyanto (Acting Officer)	Independent	6 December 2016	21 August 2017	258 days	31 (2013)	Sugeng Rismiyanto	
	Eddy Supriyanto (Acting)	Independent	29 April 2024	20 February 2025	297 days	–	Transition (2024–2025)	
	F. Bagus Panuntun (Acting Officer)	PSI	21 January 2026	Incumbent	229 days	33 (2024)	–	

== See also ==
- Madiun
- List of incumbent regional heads and deputy regional heads in East Java
