= Semarang Regency Regional House of Representatives =

Municipal legislature of the regency of Semarang, Central Java, Indonesia

Semarang Regency Regional House of Representatives Dewan Perwakilan Rakyat Daerah Kabupaten Semarang
- 2024–2029 period

Type
- Type: Unicameral
- Established: 14 September 1950; 75 years ago (as Provisional Semarang Regency House of Representatives)

Leadership
- Speaker: Bondan Marutohening, PDI-P since 24 September 2019
- Deputy Speaker: Zaenudin, PPP since 23 October 2024
- Deputy Speaker: Umar Sujadi, PKB since 7 October 2024
- Deputy Speaker: Suyadi, NasDem since 7 October 2024

Structure
- Seats: 50
- Political groups: Government (44): PDI-P (18); NasDem (5); PKB (5); Gerindra (4); Golkar (4); PKS (4); PAN (2); Hanura (1); Democratic (1); Opposition (6): PPP (6)

Elections
- Voting system: Party-list proportional representation
- First election: 1957
- Last general election: 14 February 2024
- Next general election: 2031

Meeting place
- Semarang Regency DPRD Building, Ungaran

Website
- dprd.semarangkab.go.id

The Semarang Regency Regional House of Representatives is the unicameral municipal legislature of Semarang Regency, Central Java, Indonesia. It has 50 members, who are elected every five years, simultaneously with the national legislative election.

== History ==
The legislature for Semarang Regency was formed along with those of other regencies in Central Java under Law No. 13 of 1950, which organized regency governments within the province. They were formed sometime between September 1950 and January 1951 as provisional regional houses of representatives (DPRDS). The first election to elect its members was in 1957, with the Indonesian Communist Party winning 18 out of 35 seats and Nahdlatul Ulama placing second with 12 seats.

== Members ==
In the 2024–2029 term, the DPRD had 50 members originating from 10 parties. The largest party, the Indonesian Democratic Party of Struggle (PDI-P), holds 18 seats. Members are elected from five electoral districts. The most recent increase in member count was in 2019, when the number of seats was increased from 45 to 50. The current speaker is Bondan Marutohening from PDI-P, who has served since September 2019 and was reelected for a second term as speaker in 2024.
