= Ungaran =

Capital and largest city of Semarang Regency, Indonesia

- Town
- Ungaran; Kota Ungaran

Other transcription(s)
  - Javanese: ꦏꦸꦠ꧀ꦲꦻꦴꦤ꧀ꦒꦫꦤ꧀
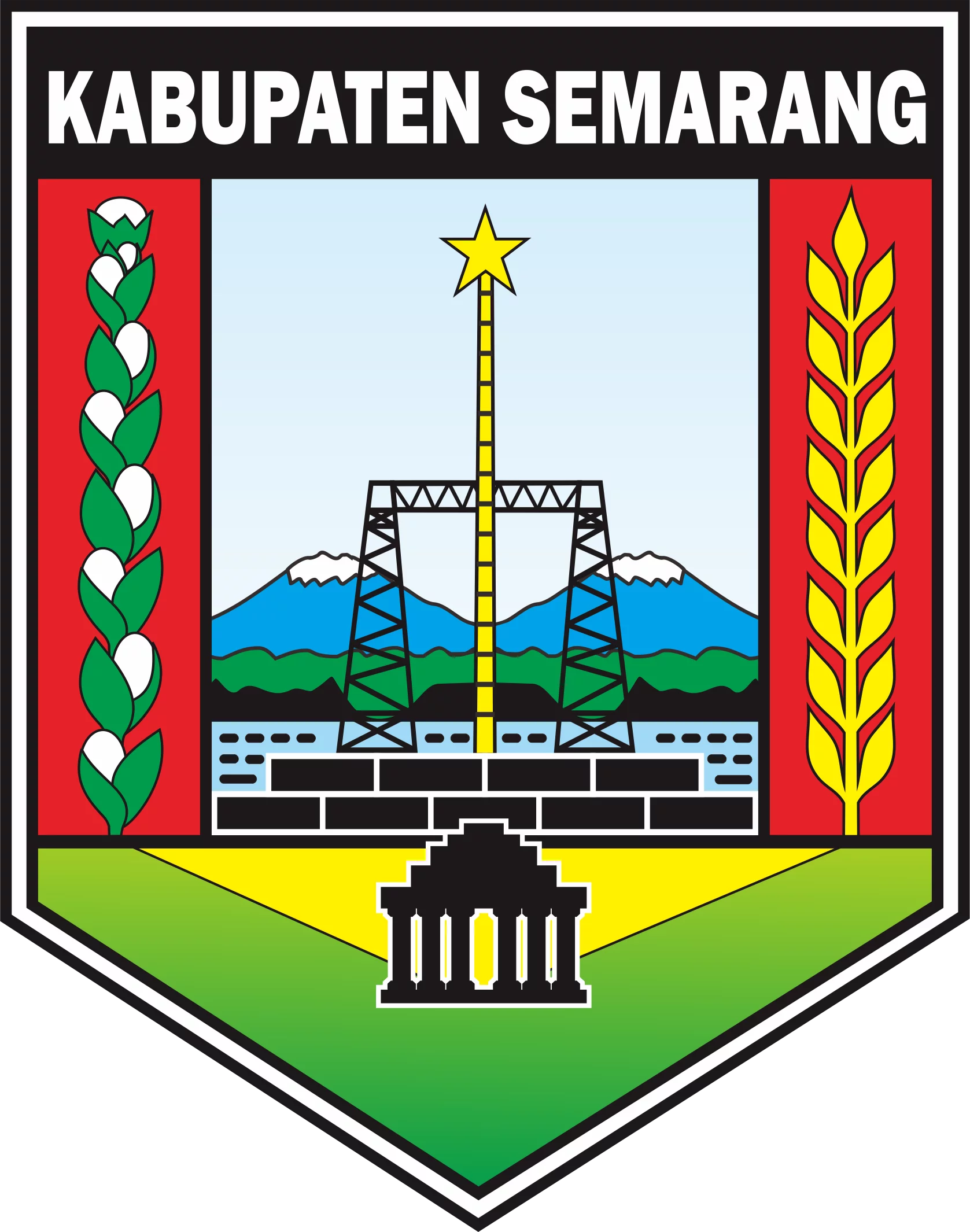
- Coat of arms
- Nicknames: Benteng Ungaran (Fort Ungaran)
- Motto: Bumi Serasi
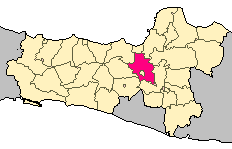
- Location within Central Java

- Location in Java and Indonesia Ungaran (Indonesia)
- Coordinates: 7°8′17″S 110°24′18″E
- Country: Indonesia
- Province: Central Java

Government
  - Type: Regent-council
  - Body: Ungaran Town Government
  - Regent: Ngesti Nugraha (PDI-P)
  - Vice Mayor: Nur Arifah
  - Legislature: Semarang Regency Regional House of Representatives (DPRD)

Area
  - Total: 73.95 km^{2} (28.55 sq mi)

Population (mid 2025 estimate)
  - Total: 167,766 (58th)
  - Density: 2,269/km^{2} (5,876/sq mi)

Demographics
  - Ethnic groups: Javanese majority Chinese minority Others
  - Religion (2024): Islam 96.5% Christianity 3.1%: Protestant 1.9%; Roman Catholic 1.2%; Buddhism 0.2% Hinduism 0.1% Confucianism and others 0.1%
- Time zone: UTC+7 (WIB)
- Postcodes: 505xx
- Area code: (+62) 24
- Vehicle registration: H
- Website: semarangkab.go.id

Ungaran (Dutch: Oengaran) is a town and adjacent areas in Central Java Province of Indonesia. The town serves as the administrative centre of the Semarang Regency in that province. Ungaran is located at -7° 8' 17", 110° 24' 18" at an elevation of 319 metres. It encompasses two districts (kecamatan) within the Regency - Ungaran Barat (West Ungaran) covering 35.96 km^{2} with a population of 83,212 in 2025, and Ungaran Timur (East Ungaran) covering 37.99 km^{2} with a population of 84,554 in 2025.

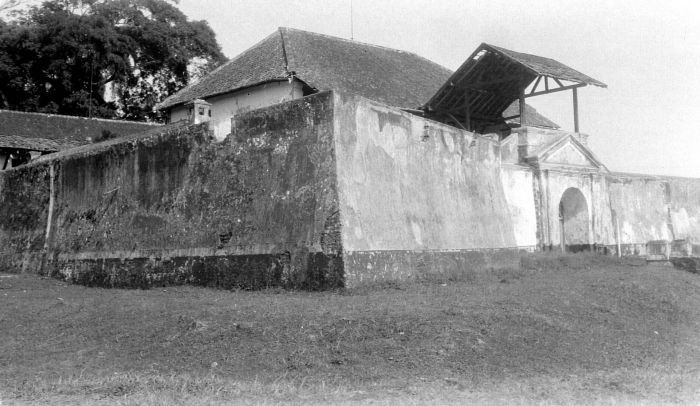
Fort Ontmoeting (Fort Willem II), where Prince Diponegoro was imprisoned while waiting for his judgment in Batavia and further exile to Makassar, Oengaran, Dutch East Indies.

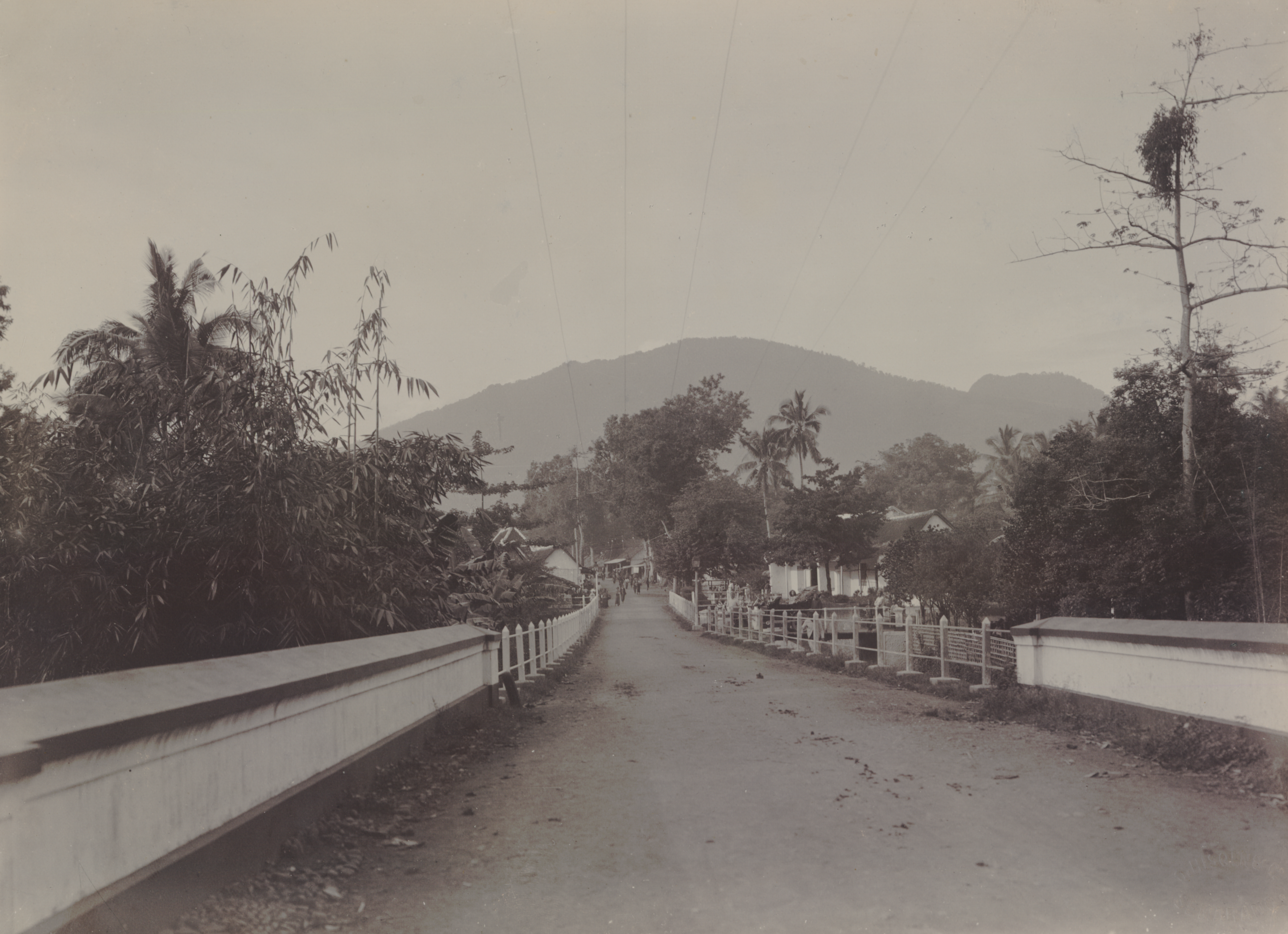
Bridge to the village of Oengaran and Oengaran in the background near Samarang.

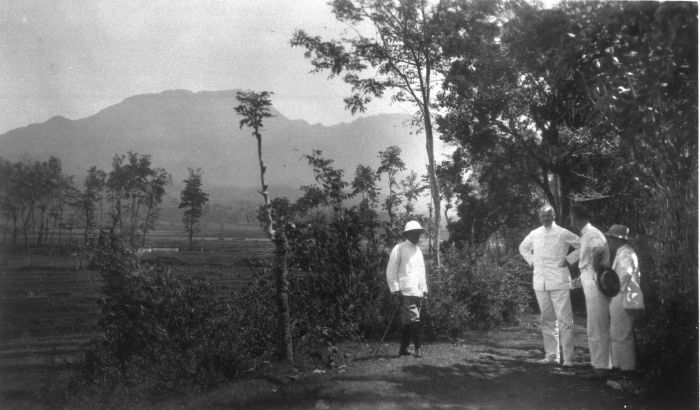
Landscape and villages near the Ungaran volcano in Central Java.

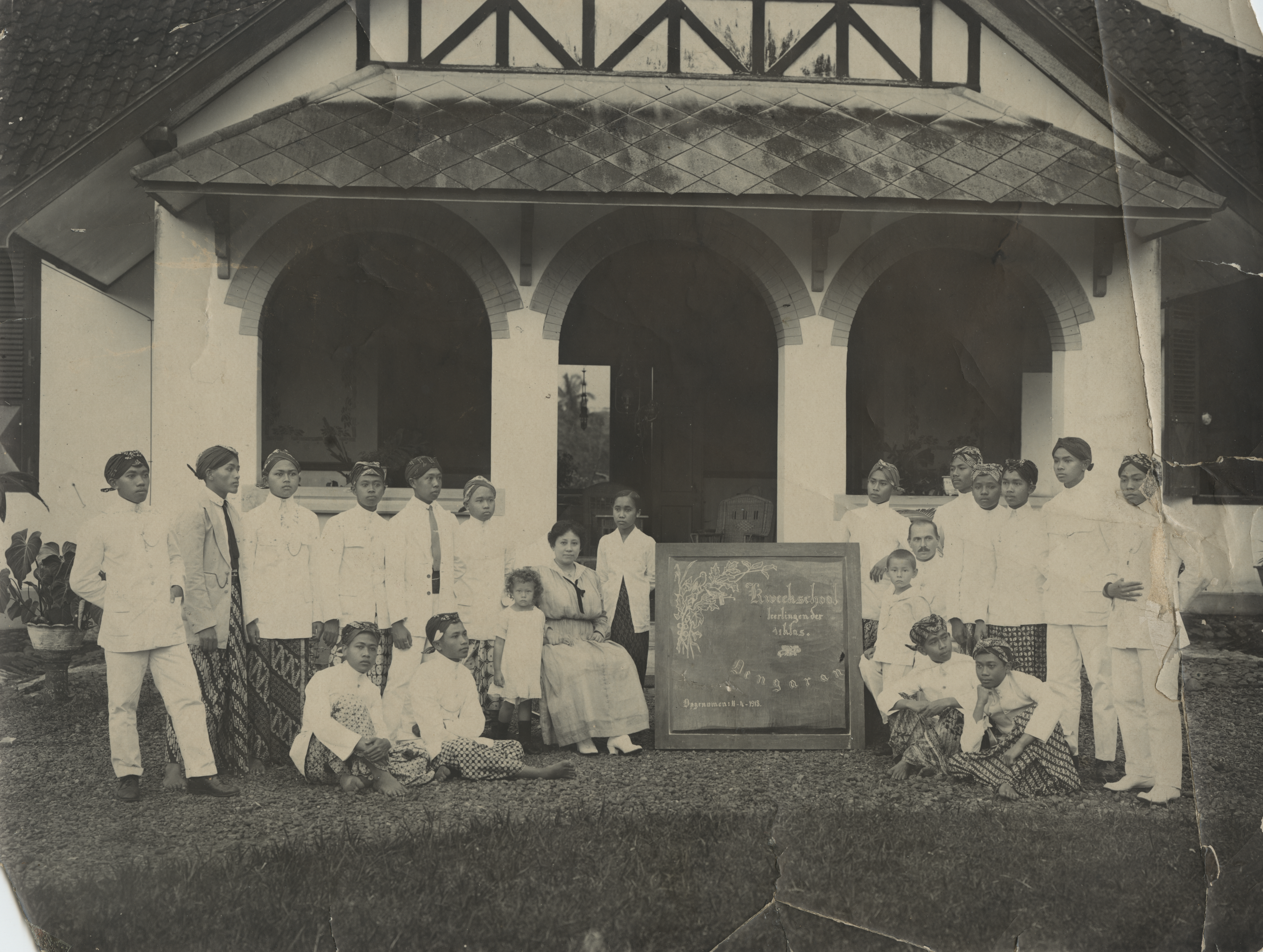
The first-year class of the Kweekschool in Oengaran.

== Villages ==
Ungaran is sub-divided into 21 villages, of which 11 are in West Ungaran and 10 are in East Ungaran.

Name of Village	District	Status ^{(a)} as Rural (desa) or Urban (kelurahan)	Area in km^{2}	Pop'n census 2020 ^{(a)}	Pop'n estimate 2023 ^{(b)}	Region code (Kode Wilayah)	Post code (Kode POS)
Branjang	West Ungaran (Ungaran Barat)	Rural	4.33	3,321	3,460	33.22.18.2001	50519
Kalisidi	West Ungaran (Ungaran Barat)	Rural	7.96	6,538	6,771	33.22.18.2002	50519
Keji	West Ungaran (Ungaran Barat)	Rural	1.83	2,551	2,778	33.22.18.2003	50519
Lerep	West Ungaran (Ungaran Barat)	Rural	6.82	12,255	12,450	33.22.18.2004	50519
Nyatnyono	West Ungaran (Ungaran Barat)	Rural	4.25	8,653	9,008	33.22.18.2005	50551
Candirejo	West Ungaran (Ungaran Barat)	Urban	2.12	5,243	5,246	33.22.18.1006	50513
Genuk	West Ungaran (Ungaran Barat)	Urban	1.58	8,267	7,962	33.22.18.1007	50512
Ungaran (town)	West Ungaran (Ungaran Barat)	Urban	1.66	10,937	11,446	33.22.18.1008	50511
Bandarjo	West Ungaran (Ungaran Barat)	Urban	2.25	9,833	10,064	33.22.18.1009	50517
Langensari	West Ungaran (Ungaran Barat)	Urban	1.67	9,585	9,868	33.22.18.1010	50518
Gogik	West Ungaran (Ungaran Barat)	Rural	1.49	3,891	4,075	33.22.18.2011	50551
Sidomulyo	East Ungaran (Ungaran Timur)	Urban	1.17	4,352	4,478	33.22.19.1001	50514
Kalirejo	East Ungaran (Ungaran Timur)	Urban	3.04	4,423	4,563	33.22.19.1002	50515
Susukan	East Ungaran (Ungaran Timur)	Urban	3.04	9,662	9,741	33.22.19.1003	50516
Mluweh	East Ungaran (Ungaran Timur)	Rural	4.25	4,247	4,542	33.22.19.2004	50519
Kawengen	East Ungaran (Ungaran Timur)	Rural	7.48	7,048	7,651	33.22.19.2005	50519
Kalikayen	East Ungaran (Ungaran Timur)	Rural	3.23	3,785	4,019	33.22.19.2006	50519
Gedanganak	East Ungaran (Ungaran Timur)	Urban	2.90	14,263	13,506	33.22.19.1007	50519
Beji	East Ungaran (Ungaran Timur)	Urban	2.17	8,558	8,576	33.22.19.1008	50519
Leyangan	East Ungaran (Ungaran Timur)	Rural	2.03	9,144	8,673	33.22.19.2009	50519
Kalongan	East Ungaran (Ungaran Timur)	Rural	8.68	14,285	14,039	33.22.19.2010	50519

Note: (a) Badan Pusat Statistik, Jakarta, 2021. (b) Badan Pusat Statistik, Jakarta, 2024.

== Ungaran Volcano ==
The Ungaran Volcano (Gunung Ungaran in Indonesian) is a deeply eroded stratovolcano, located south of the northern coastal city of Semarang and west of Ungaran town, at map reference 7.18 degrees South and 110.33 degrees East. It has a height of 2,050 m (6,726 ft). It lies at the northern end of a transverse chain of Java volcanoes extending north-north-west from Mount Merapi. It was formed in three stages, with growth of the youngest edifice taking place during the late Pleistocene and Holocene eras. This youngest edifice was constructed south of three large remnant structural blocks of the second Ungaran volcano. A group of pyroclastic cones was also constructed along the margins of the older edifice. The volcano is deeply eroded and no historical eruptions have been reported, but two active fumarole fields are located on its flanks.

== Climate ==
Ungaran has a tropical rainforest climate (Af) with moderate rainfall from June to September and heavy to very heavy rainfall from November to May.

Climate data for Ungaran
Month	Jan	Feb	Mar	Apr	May	Jun	Jul	Aug	Sep	Oct	Nov	Dec	Year
Mean daily maximum °C (°F)	28.4 (83.1)	28.4 (83.1)	28.9 (84.0)	29.7 (85.5)	30.0 (86.0)	30.1 (86.2)	30.4 (86.7)	31.1 (88.0)	31.6 (88.9)	31.5 (88.7)	30.3 (86.5)	29.0 (84.2)	30.0 (85.9)
Daily mean °C (°F)	24.3 (75.7)	24.3 (75.7)	24.6 (76.3)	25.1 (77.2)	25.4 (77.7)	24.9 (76.8)	24.7 (76.5)	25.0 (77.0)	25.6 (78.1)	26.0 (78.8)	25.5 (77.9)	24.6 (76.3)	25.0 (77.0)
Mean daily minimum °C (°F)	20.3 (68.5)	20.3 (68.5)	20.4 (68.7)	20.6 (69.1)	20.8 (69.4)	19.7 (67.5)	19.0 (66.2)	19.0 (66.2)	19.7 (67.5)	20.5 (68.9)	20.7 (69.3)	20.2 (68.4)	20.1 (68.2)
Average rainfall mm (inches)	409 (16.1)	348 (13.7)	363 (14.3)	279 (11.0)	208 (8.2)	101 (4.0)	88 (3.5)	66 (2.6)	77 (3.0)	163 (6.4)	254 (10.0)	341 (13.4)	2,697 (106.2)
Source: Climate-Data.org

== See also ==
• Semarang

• Semarang Regency

• Mount Ungaran, the dominant geographic landmark overlooking the town

• Gedong Songo, a major Hindu temple complex on the slopes of Mount Ungaran

• Kedungsepur, the metropolitan cooperation area that includes Semarang and surrounding regencies

• NIS, a colonial railway company responsible for early rail infrastructure in the region
