= Bagus Panuntun =

Acting Officer Mayor of Madiun

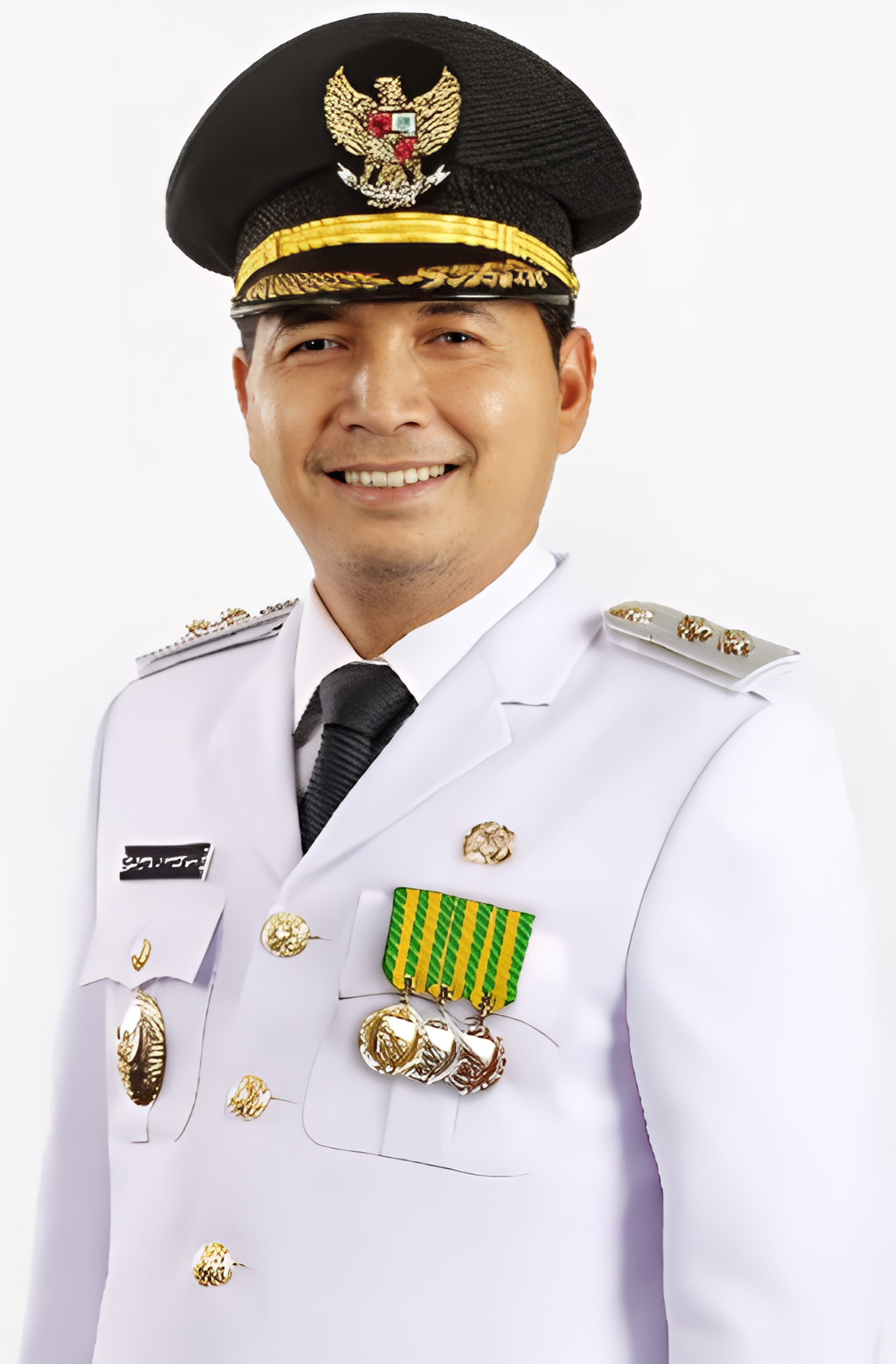

Acting Officer Mayor of Madiun
- Incumbent
- Assumed office 21 January 2026
- President: Prabowo Subianto
- Governor: Khofifah Indar Parawansa
- Preceded by: Maidi

5th Vice mayor of Madiun
- In office 20 February 2025 – 20 January 2026
- President: Prabowo Subianto
- Governor: Khofifah Indar Parawansa
- Preceded by: Inda Raya Ayu Miko Saputri
- Succeeded by: Vacant

Personal details
- Born: November 6, 1981 (age 44) Madiun, East Java, Indonesia
- Party: Indonesian Solidarity Party
- Spouse: Dellina Mahardika Panuntun
- Profession: Politician

Fransiskus Bagus Panuntun (born 6 November 1981) is an Indonesian politician from the Indonesian Solidarity Party who has served as Acting Officer Mayor of Madiun since 21 January 2026, replacing Maidi who has been named a suspect in the alleged bribery case of projects and CSR funds by the KPK. Previously, Bagus served as Vice mayor of Madiun for the 2025–2030 term.

== Biography ==
=== Career ===
Before being inaugurated as Vice Mayor, Bagus served as a member of the Madiun City Regional House of Representatives for the 2019–2024 term. He also served as Chairman of the Madiun City Area Leadership Council of the Indonesian Solidarity Party. Currently, Bagus serves as Chairman of the East Java Regional Leadership Council of the Indonesian Solidarity Party for the 2025–2030 term.

In the 2024 Madiun mayoral election, Bagus ran as Vice mayor of Madiun for the 2025–2030 term, running alongside the incumbent Mayor, Maidi. This pair of candidates emerged victorious, securing 65.583 votes, or 56,04% of the total valid votes.

Political offices
Preceded by Inda Raya Ayu Miko Saputri	Vice mayor of Madiun; 2025–now	Succeeded by Incumbent
