= List of Indonesian regencies by population =

Indonesia's thirty-four provinces (including five with special status) are divided into 514 second-level administrative divisions (daerah tingkat II) - comprising 416 regencies (kabupaten in Indonesian) and 98 cities (kota) which are independent of the regencies in which they are geographically situated. As at the 2020 Census, these 514 second-level entitles are together sub-divided into 7,230 administrative districts (kecamatan). Since 2013, there has been a moratorium on the creation of additional provinces, regencies and independent cities, although proposals for new provinces and second-level divisions have been debated by the Indonesian parliament.

At the 2020 Census, the 416 regencies comprised twelve with populations of more than two million inhabitants each, fifty-one with populations of between one and two millions each, fifty-six with populations of between a half million and a million each, and 297 regencies with populations of under one half million each. Below is a list of Indonesia's 119 most populous regencies (those with more than 500,000 inhabitants at the 2020 Census) with the province in which they are located, and their populations at the 2010 and 2020 Censuses; they are ranked according to their 2020 population. Populations in 2010 and in 2020 are official data from the 2010 Census and the 2020 Census, as released by Badan Pusat Statistik or the Indonesian Central Statistics Agency.

== Regencies by population ==
Bold signifies the largest regency by population in one province.

List of the largest regencies ranked by 2020 population
Rank	Regency	Province	2010 Census BPS	2020 Census BPS
1	**Bogor**	West Java	4,771,932	5,427,068
2	Bandung	West Java	3,178,543	3,623,790
3	**Tangerang**	Banten	2,834,376	3,245,619
4	Bekasi	West Java	2,630,401	3,113,017
5	Sukabumi	West Java	2,341,409	2,725,450
6	**Malang**	East Java	2,446,218	2,654,448
7	Garut	West Java	2,404,121	2,585,607
8	Jember	East Java	2,332,726	2,536,729
9	Cianjur	West Java	2,171,281	2,477,560
10	Karawang	West Java	2,127,791	2,439,085
11	Cirebon	West Java	2,067,196	2,270,621
12	Sidoarjo	East Java	1,941,497	2,082,801
13	**Brebes**	Central Java	1,733,869	1,978,759
14	Cilacap	Central Java	1,642,107	1,944,857
15	**Deli Serdang**	North Sumatra	1,790,431	1,931,441
16	Tasikmalaya	West Java	1,675,675	1,865,203
17	Indramayu	West Java	1,663,737	1,834,434
18	West Bandung	West Java	1,510,284	1,788,336
19	Banyumas	Central Java	1,554,527	1,776,918
20	Banyuwangi	East Java	1,556,078	1,708,114
21	Kediri	East Java	1,499,768	1,635,294
22	Pasuruan	East Java	1,512,468	1,605,969
23	Tegal	Central Java	1,394,839	1,596,996
24	Subang	West Java	1,465,157	1,595,320
25	Pemalang	Central Java	1,261,353	1,471,489
26	**Central Lampung**	Lampung	1,170,717	1,460,045
27	Grobogan	Central Java	1,308,696	1,453,526
28	Lebak	Banten	1,204,095	1,386,793
29	Kebumen	Central Java	1,159,926	1,350,438
30	Lamongan	East Java	1,179,059	1,344,165
31	**East Lombok**	West Nusa Tenggara	1,105,582	1,325,240
32	Pati	Central Java	1,190,903	1,324,188
33	Jombang	East Java	1,202,407	1,318,062
34	Gresik	East Java	1,177,042	1,311,215
35	Majalengka	West Java	1,166,473	1,305,476
36	Bojonegoro	East Java	1,209,973	1,301,635
37	Magelang	Central Java	1,181,723	1,299,859
38	Pandeglang	Banten	1,149,610	1,272,687
39	Klaten	Central Java	1,130,047	1,260,506
40	Ciamis	West Java	1,148,656	1,229,069
41	Blitar	East Java	1,116,639	1,223,745
42	Demak	Central Java	1,055,579	1,203,956
43	Tuban	East Java	1,118,464	1,198,012
44	Jepara	Central Java	1,097,280	1,184,947
45	Kuningan	West Java	1,035,589	1,167,686
46	Probolinggo	East Java	1,096,244	1,152,537
47	Sumedang	West Java	1,093,602	1,152,507
48	**Sleman**	Yogyakarta	1,093,110	1,125,804
49	Sumenep	East Java	1,042,312	1,124,436
50	Lumajang	East Java	1,006,458	1,119,251
51	Mojokerto	East Java	1,025,443	1,119,209
52	East Lampung	Lampung	951,639	1,110,340
53	Nganjuk	East Java	1,017,030	1,103,902
54	Tulungagung	East Java	990,158	1,089,775
55	South Lampung	Lampung	912,490	1,064,045
56	Boyolali	Central Java	930,531	1,062,713
57	Bangkalan	East Java	906,761	1,060,377
58	Semarang	Central Java	930,727	1,053,094
59	Wonogiri	Central Java	928,904	1,043,177
60	Central Lombok	West Nusa Tenggara	860,209	1,034,859
61	Langkat	North Sumatra	967,535	1,030,202
62	Kendal	Central Java	900,313	1,018,505
63	Banjarnegara	Central Java	868,913	1,017,767

List of the largest regencies ranked by 2020 population
Rank	Regency	Province	2010 Census BPS	2020 Census BPS
64	Purbalingga	Central Java	848,952	998,561
65	Purwakarta	West Java	920,639	997,869
66	Simalungun	North Sumatra	817,720	990,246
67	Bantul	Yogyakarta	911,503	985,770
68	Sragen	Central Java	858,266	976,951
69	Sampang	East Java	877,772	969,694
70	Pekalongan	Central Java	838,621	968,821
71	Ponorogo	East Java	855,281	949,318
72	Karanganyar	Central Java	813,196	931,963
73	Sukoharjo	Central Java	824,238	907,587
74	Blora	Central Java	829,728	884,333
75	Wonosobo	Central Java	754,883	879,124
76	Ngawi	East Java	817,765	870,057
77	Pamekasan	East Java	795,918	850,057
78	Kudus	Central Java	777,437	849,184
79	**Kampar**	Riau	688,204	841,332
80	**Banyuasin**	South Sumatra	750,110	836,914
81	**Bone**	South Sulawesi	717,682	801,775
82	Batang	Central Java	706,764	801,718
83	**Buleleng**	Bali	624,125	791,813
84	Temanggung	Central Java	708,546	790,174
85	Bondowoso	East Java	736,772	776,151
86	Asahan	North Sumatra	668,272	769,960
87	Purworejo	Central Java	695,427	769,880
88	Ogan Komering Ilir	South Sumatra	727,376	769,348
89	Gowa	South Sulawesi	652,941	765,836
90	Gunung Kidul	Yogyakarta	675,382	747,161
91	Madiun	East Java	662,278	744,350
92	Trenggalek	East Java	674,411	731,125
93	**Kutai Kartanegara**	East Kalimantan	626,680	729,382
94	West Lombok	West Nusa Tenggara	599,986	721,481
95	Situbondo	East Java	647,619	685,967
96	Magetan	East Java	620,442	670,812
97	Serdang Bedagai	North Sumatra	594,383	657,490
98	Indragiri Hilir	Riau	661,779	654,909
99	East Ogan Komering Ulu	South Sumatra	609,982	649,853
100	Rembang	Central Java	591,359	645,333
101	Tanggamus	Lampung	536,613	640,275
102	Rokan Hilir	Riau	553,216	637,161
103	North Lampung	Lampung	584,277	633,099
104	**Sambas**	West Kalimantan	496,120	629,905
105	Musi Banyuasin	South Sumatra	561,458	622,206
106	Muara Enim	South Sumatra	551,202	612,900
107	Kubu Raya	West Kalimantan	500,970	609,392
108	**North Aceh**	Aceh	529,751	602,793
109	Pacitan	East Java	540,881	586,110
110	Ketapang	West Kalimantan	427,460	570,657
111	**Banjar**	South Kalimantan	506,839	565,635
112	Bengkalis	Riau	498,336	565,569
113	Rokan Hulu	Riau	474,843	561,385
114	Badung	Bali	543,332	548,191
115	**Agam**	West Sumatra	454,853	529,138
116	Gianyar	Bali	469,777	515,344
117	Bima	West Nusa Tenggara	439,228	514,105
118	Sumbawa	West Nusa Tenggara	415,789	509,753
119	Pesisir Selatan	West Sumatra	429,246	504,418

=== Least Populated Regencies ===
Rank	Regency	Province	2010 Census BPS	2020 Census BPS	Mid-2024 Estimate BPS
1	Supiori	Papua	15,874	22,547	24,530
2	Tana Tidung	North Kalimantan	15,202	25,584	27,470
3	Kepulauan Seribu	Jakarta	21,082	27,749	28,809
4	Tambrauw	Southwest Papua	6,144	28,379	31,354
5	Waropen	Papua	24,639	33,943	35,810
6	South Manokwari	West Papua	18,564	35,949	38,820
7	Mahakam Ulu	East Kalimantan	25,946	32,513	39,319
8	Mamberamo Raya	Papua	18,365	36,483	39,390
9	Konawe Islands	Southeast Sulawesi	28,944	37,050	39,690
10	Arfak Mountains	West Papua	23,877	38,207	41,470

=== Distribution ===
Population	Number of regencies
more than 2,000,000	15
1,000,000–1,999,999	54
700,000–999,999	26
500,000–699,999	27
400,000–499,999	41
300,000–399,999	47
200,000–299,999	71
100,000–199,999	90
less than 100,000	47
**Total**	416

== See also ==
- List of Indonesian cities by population
- List of regencies and cities of Indonesia
