= Madiun City Regional House of Representatives =

Unicameral legislature of the Indonesian city of Madiun

Madiun City Regional House of Representatives Dewan Perwakilan Rakyat Daerah Kota Madiun
- 2024–2029 period

Type
- Type: Unicameral

History
- Founded: 1950
- New session started: 24 August 2024

Leadership
- Speaker: Armaya, Perindo since 14 October 2024
- Deputy Speaker: Sutardi, PDI-P since 14 October 2024
- Deputy Speaker: Istono, Democratic since 14 October 2024

Structure
- Seats: 30
- Political groups: Government (19): PSI (4); NasDem (2); PKB (3); Demokrat (4); Gerindra (2); PKS (4); Opposition (11): Perindo (4); PDI-P (4); Golkar (3)
- Length of term: 5 years

Elections
- Voting system: Open list proportional representation
- First election: 1957
- Last election: 14 February 2024
- Next election: 2031

Meeting place
- Madiun City Regional House of Representatives Building; Taman Praja Street Number 97; Pandean, Taman, Madiun; East Java, Indonesia

Website
- dprd.madiunkota.go.id

The Madiun City Regional House of Representatives (Indonesian: Dewan Perwakilan Rakyat Daerah Kota Madiun, DPRD Kota Madiun) is the unicameral municipal legislature of Madiun, East Java, Indonesia. It has 30 members, who are elected every five years, simultaneously with the national legislative election.

== Legal basis ==
The legislature for Madiun was formed along with those of other cities in East Java under Law Number 16 of 1950, which organized city governments within the province.

== General election results ==
=== 2024 Indonesian legislative election ===
The official valid votes received by political parties contesting the 2024 Indonesian legislative election in each electoral district (constituency) for members of the Madiun City Regional House of Representatives are as follows.

2024 Indonesian legislative election results

Electoral district	PKB	Gerindra	PDI-P	Golkar	NasDem	Labour	Gelora	PKS	PKN	Hanura	Garuda	PAN	PBB	Democratic	PSI	Perindo	PPP	Ummat	Valid votes
Madiun City 1	4,967	3,516	3,865	4,518	163	37	58	3,303	5	23	0	198	6	3,871	3,278	5,492	60	98	33,458
Madiun City 2	3,343	1,814	2,680	4,239	759	29	146	2,974	17	6	0	290	4	2,002	3,420	3,177	42	17	24,959
Madiun City 3	2,287	1,798	3,324	1,494	2,678	90	93	2,886	100	13	0	2,277	41	3,075	2,296	2,999	53	22	25,526
Madiun City 4	3,485	3,321	3,384	4,642	3,481	34	33	2,259	119	22	0	825	6	3,622	3,356	3,826	1,476	52	33,943
Total	14,082	10,449	13,253	14,893	7,081	190	330	11,422	241	64	0	3,590	57	12,570	12,350	15,494	1,631	189	117,886
Source: General Elections Commission of Indonesia

== Composition ==
The following is the composition of members of the Madiun City Regional House of Representatives in the last four periods.

Party	Total seats			
Party	2009–2014	2014–2019	2019–2024	2024–2029
PKB	3	▲4	4	▼3
Gerindra	2	▲4	▼3	▼2
PDI-P	3	▲6	6	▼4
Golkar	3	▼2	2	▲3
NasDem		2	▼1	▲2
PKS	2	▼1	▲2	▲4
Hanura	2	▼1	▼0	0
PAN	3	▼2	▼1	▼0
Demokrat	8	▼7	▼4	4
PSI			2	▲4
Perindo			4	4
PPP	0	▲1	1	▼0
PDP	2			
PDS	1			
PKNU	1			
Total Seats	30	30	30	30
Total Party	11	▼10	▲11	▼9

== Electoral district ==
In the 2019 Legislative Election and the 2024 Legislative Election, the Madiun City Regional House of Representatives election was divided into 4 electoral districts as follows:

Electoral District Name	Electoral District Area	Number of Seats
MADIUN CITY 1	Kartoharjo	8
MADIUN CITY 2	Taman A (Mojorejo, Pandean, Kejuron, Taman)	7
MADIUN CITY 3	Taman B (Manisrejo, Banjarejo, Demangan, Josenan, Kuncen)	6
MADIUN CITY 4	Manguharjo	9
TOTAL		30

== See also ==
- East Java Regional House of Representatives
- Madiun
- East Java
