= Philautus jacobsoni =

Conservation status
- Critically endangered, possibly extinct (IUCN 3.1)

Scientific classification
- Kingdom: Animalia
- Phylum: Chordata
- Class: Amphibia
- Order: Anura
- Family: Rhacophoridae
- Genus: Philautus
- Species: P. jacobsoni

Binomial name
- Philautus jacobsoni (van Kampen, 1912)

Species of frog

Philautus jacobsoni is a species of frog in the family Rhacophoridae. It is endemic to Java, Indonesia. It is known only from Mount Ungaran, Central Java, Indonesia. There is only one preserved specimen held at the Naturalis Biodiversity Center in Leiden, Netherlands that was collected in the 1930s. Its status in the wild is currently unknown and could possibly be extinct, as it has not been recently found.

Its natural habitats are subtropical or tropical moist lowland forests and subtropical or tropical moist montane forests. It is threatened by habitat loss.
