= Tuntang =

District in Semarang Regency

Coordinates: 7.2683°S 110.4544°E

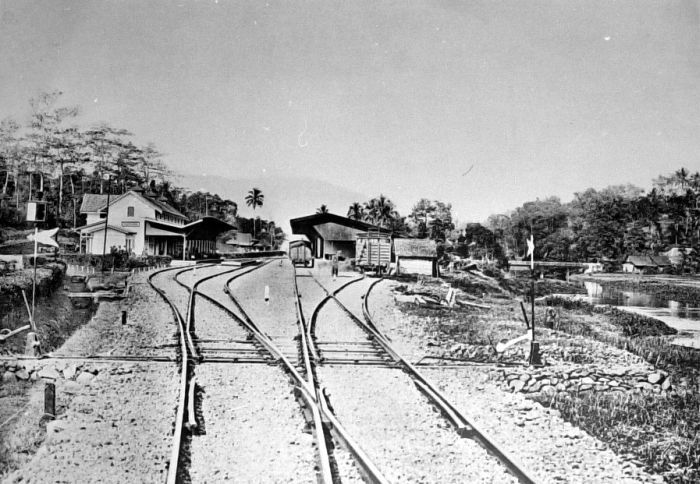
Toentang railway station of the NIS

Tuntang (Dutch: Toentang) is an administrative district (kecamatan), and a town within that district, in Semarang Regency of Central Java Province, Indonesia. The Dutch built a railway station in the town. The district covers 56.24 sq.km, and is adjacent to the city of Salatiga on the latter's northwest side. The total population for the Tuntang district was 60,392 in 2010 and had grown to 71,836 in mid 2025. In 2023 the town of Tuntang had 6,624 inhabitants. The geographical coordinates for Tuntang are -7 16' 06'' (-7.268) latitude and 110 27' 16'' (110.454) longitude. The altitude at Tuntang is 700 m above sea level.
