= Mount Ungaran =

Stratovolcano in Central Java, Indonesia

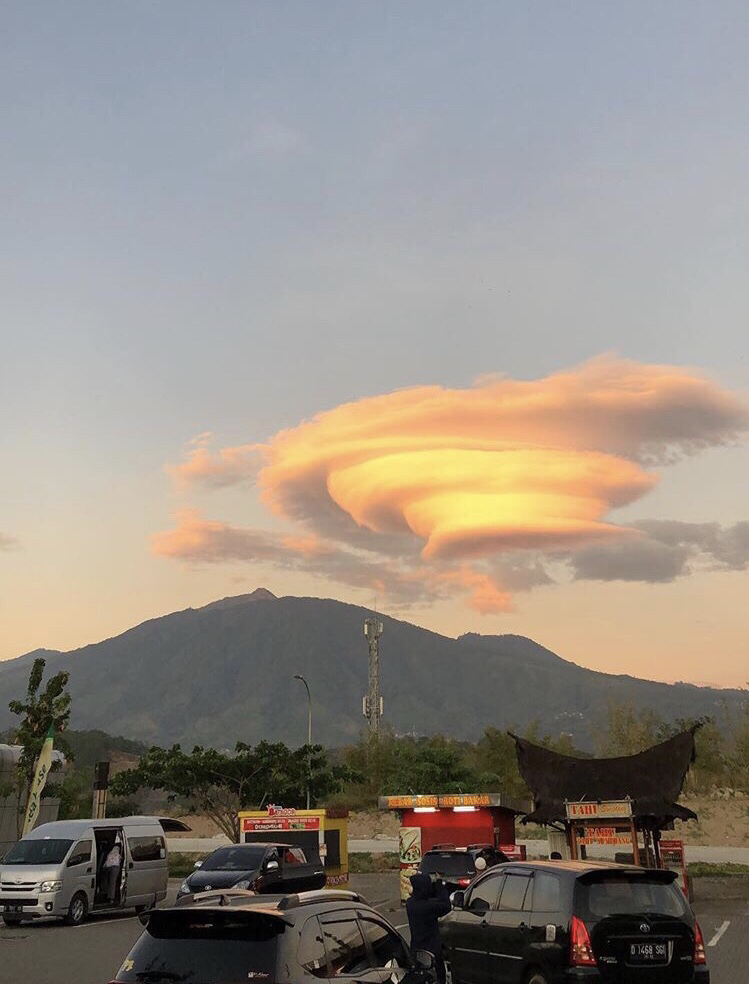
- Mount Ungaran seen in a rest area of Trans-Java Toll Road

Highest point
- Elevation: 2,050 m (6,730 ft)
- Listing: Ribu
- Coordinates: 7.18°S 110.33°E

Geography
- Location within Java Location within Indonesia
- Location: Java, Indonesia

Geology
- Rock age: Holocene
- Mountain type: stratovolcano
- Volcanic arc: Sunda Arc

Mount Ungaran is a deeply eroded stratovolcano, located in the south of Semarang, Central Java, Indonesia. There are no historical records about the mountain's activities. Two active fumarole fields are found on the southern flanks.

The town of Ungaran is located on the eastern side of the volcano, whereas Ambarawa lays of its southern wing. Bandungan and surroundings, including the Gedong Songo temple complex, are tourist attractions on the volcano. The lake of Rawa Pening is located southeast of the volcano.

Endemic fauna includes Philautus jacobsoni, a tree frog that has not been seen for decades.

== History ==
Starting on 26 October 1945, the Magelang and Ungaran offensives swept across the slopes of Mount Ungaran. For 49 days, the Indonesian military steadily pushed back the Dutch and British military across the mountainsides until they were at Semarang city.

== See also ==
- List of volcanoes in Indonesia
