= Semarang Regency =

Regency in Central Java, Indonesia

Semarang Regency Kabupaten Semarang
- Regency

Other transcription(s)
  - Javanese: ꦏꦨꦸꦥꦠꦺꦯꦼꦩꦫꦁ
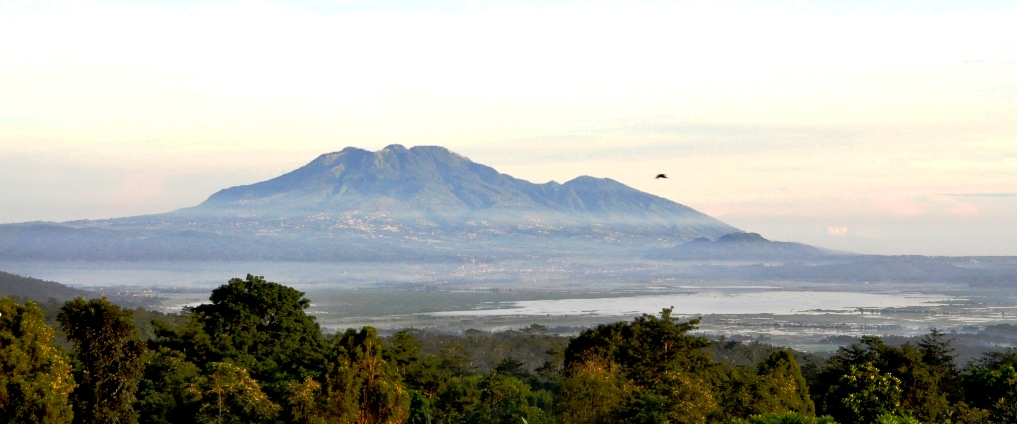
- A view of Mount Ungaran, Lake Rawapening and the towns of Bandungan and Ambarawa

- Coat of arms
- Motto: Dharmottama Satya Praja (Doing the best effort for the people)
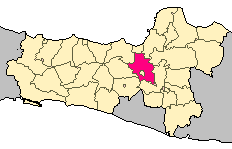
- Semarang Regency within Central Java

- Location in Indonesia
- Coordinates: 7°15′56″S 110°20′9″E
- Country: Indonesia
- Province: Central Java
- Founded: 2 May 1547
- Capital: Ungaran

Government
  - Mayor: Ngesti Nugraha
  - Vice-mayor: Nur Arifah

Area
  - Total: 1,019.27 km^{2} (393.54 sq mi)

Population (mid 2025 estimate)
  - Total: 1,098,572
  - Density: 1,077.80/km^{2} (2,791.50/sq mi)
- Time zone: UTC+7 (Indonesia Western Standard Time)
- Area codes: 0274, 0298
- Vehicle registration: H
- Website: semarangkab.go.id

Semarang is a landlocked regency (Indonesian: kabupaten) in Central Java province in Indonesia. It covers an area of 1,019.27 km^{2} and had a population of 930,727 at the 2010 census and 1,053,094 at the 2020 census; the official estimate at mid 2025 was 1,098,572 (comprising 546,479 males and 552,093 females). These figures exclude the independent cities of Semarang and Salatiga, which are administratively separate from the regency. The regency's capital is Ungaran, which lies immediately to the south of Semarang City.

== Geography ==
Administratively, Semarang Regency borders Kendal Regency and Temanggung Regency in the west, Boyolali Regency and Magelang Regency in the south, Grobogan Regency and Demak Regency in the east, and the city of Semarang in the north. Salatiga City, meanwhile, forms an enclave within the regency, from which it is administratively separate. Geographically, it is located between 110°14′54,74″–110°39'3"E and 7°3'57"–7°30'S. Semarang Regency covers an area of 101,927 ha (251,870 acres), with a productive land area of 24,417 ha (60,340 acres).

Air temperature in this regency is relatively cold because it is located between 318 and 1,450 m above sea level. Ungaran Barat District is the lowest area, while Getasan District is the highest. In 2005 there was 97 rainy days and in 2007 was 83 rainy days. Bawen District is an area with the most rainy days (144 days) and Suruh District the least (30 days).

== Demographics ==
Semarang Regency had an estimated population of 1,098,572 in mid 2025, an increase of 45,478 (or 4.3%) since the 2020 census. The gender ratio in mid 2025 was 98.98 (males per 100 females).

== Government and administrative division ==
The regency is governed by an elected regent and a municipal legislature (DPRD), both serving five-year terms. As of 2025, the regent is Ngesti Nugraha from the Indonesian Democratic Party of Struggle (PDI-P), who had served since February 2021. PDI-P is also the largest party in the municipal DPRD, with 18 out of 50 members in the 2024–2029 term.

Semarang Regency comprises nineteen districts (kecamatan), listed below with their areas and their populations at the 2010 Census and the 2020 Census, together with the official estimates as at mid 2025. The table also includes the locations of the district administrative centres, the number of villages in each district (totalling 208 rural villages or desa, and 27 urban villages or kelurahan), and its post codes.

Kode Wilayah	Name of District (kecamatan)	Area (km^{2})	Pop'n 2010 census	Pop'n 2020 census	Pop'n mid 2025 estimate	Admin centre	No. of villages	Post codes
33.22.01	Getasan	65.80	47,956	52,932	54,546	Getasan	13	50774
33.22.02	Tengaran	47.30	64,146	71,966	74,748	Tengaran	15	50225 - 50775
33.22.03	Susukan	48.87	43,124	49,545	52,055	Susukan	13	50777
33.22.17	Kaliwungu ^{(a)}	29.95	26,310	30,311	31,889	Kaliwungu	11	50221 - 50229
33.22.04	Suruh	64.02	59,640	70,088	74,450	Suruh	17	50186 - 50776
33.22.05	Pabelan	47.98	37,256	44,457	47,574	Pabelan	17	50771
33.22.06	Tuntang	56.24	60,392	68,700	71,836	Tuntang	16	50131 - 50773
33.22.07	Banyubiru	54.41	40,219	44,294	45,596	Banyubiru	10	50664
33.22.08	Jambu	51.63	36,551	40,642	42,031	Jambu	10 ^{(b)}	50271 - 50663
33.22.09	Sumowono ^{(c)}	55.63	29,681	33,967	35,620	Sumowono	16	50123 - 50662
33.22.10	Ambarawa	28.22	58,299	63,753	65,402	Kranggan	10 ^{(d)}	50611 - 50614
33.22.20	Bandungan	48.23	52,443	58,799	61,053	Bandungan	10 ^{(e)}	50614 - 50663
33.22.11	Bawen	46.57	53,725	59,675	61,683	Harjosari	9 ^{(f)}	50661
33.22.12	Bringin	61.89	40,976	46,441	48,474	Bringin	16	50218 - 50772
33.22.16	Bancak	43.85	19,837	23,888	25,676	Boto	9	50125 - 50182
33.22.15	Pringapus	78.35	49,948	56,885	59,515	Pringapus	9 ^{(e)}	50212 - 50552
33.22.13	Bergas	47.33	67,993	75,910	78,658	Bergas Lor	13 ^{(g)}	50187 - 50552
33.22.18	West Ungaran (Ungaran Barat)	35.96	74,063	81,074	83,212	Lerep	11 ^{(h)}	50511 - 50513, 50517 - 50519, 50551 ^{(i)}
33.22.19	East Ungaran (Ungaran Timur)	37.99	68,168	79,767	84,554	Kalongan	10 ^{(j)}	50514 - 50516, 50519
	Totals	1,019.27	930,727	1,053,094	1,098,572	Ungaran	235	

Notes: (a) Kaliwungu is the most southerly district in this regency, and is surrounded to the west, south and east by Boyolali Regency.
(b) including one kelurahan (Gondoriyo).
(c) Sumowono District forms a westerly projection from the rest of the regency, with Kendal Regency to the north and Temanggung Regency to the southwest.
(d) comprising eight kelurahan (Baran, Kranggan, Kupang, Lodoyong, Ngampin, Panjang, Pojoksari and Tambakboyo) and two desa.
(e) including one kelurahan (the district administrative centre). (f) including two kelurahan (Bawen and Harjosari).
(g) comprising four kelurahan (Bergas Lor, Karangjati, Ngempon and Wujil) and nine desa. (h) comprising five kelurahan (Bandarjo, Candirejo, Genuk, Langensari and Ungaran) and six desa.
(i) the desa of Nyatnyono and kelurahan of Gogik share the postcode of 50551. (j) comprising five kelurahan (Beji, Gedanganak, Kalirejo, Sidomulyo and Susukan) and five desa.

== Tourist attractions ==
1. Budha Gaya Watugong Shrine. Budha Gaya Watugong shrine complex has great artistic value. With the height of 39 metres, it represents the highest pagoda in Indonesia. It was built in 2005, and it is located in front of Makodam IV Diponegoro Semarang. In the seven-floor building, there are some Welas Asih Goddess statues lied on its second until sixth floor, and also has 20 Kwan Im statues.
2. The Indonesian Railway Museum is located on the town of Ambarawa. The museum is located on a decommissioned railway station and houses several train locomotives, carriages, and railway paraphernalia from the colonial era.
3. The Gedong Songo Temple Complex are a series of temples located some 5 kilometers from the town of Bandungan, on the slopes of Mount Ungaran built in the Hindu-Buddhist era.
4. Penggaron Forest. It is about 350 m (1,150 ft) above sea level with a temperature of 20–26 °C with fresh and clean air. This forest recreation site lies within 17 km from Semarang and only 2 km from Ungaran, making the area very close to urban areas. It is dominated by pine trees, though other species can also be found.
5. Lake Rawa Pening is a freshwater lake located in the districts of Ambarawa, Banyubiru, Bawen, and Tuntang. It is home to a unique ecosystem made out of floating water hyacinth islands and is an important center of fisheries and birdlife in the regency.
6. Tlogo Coffee Plantation. Tlogo Coffee Plantation is located in Delik Village. It is an area with a width of 415 ha (1,030 acres) and is 400–675 m above sea level. Cold weather and clean air, free from pollution, will bring enjoyable moment and beautiful panorama.
