= Madiun =

City in East Java, Indonesia

- City
- City of Madiun; Kota Madiun

Other transcription(s)
  - Javanese: Kuthå Madhiyun (Gêdrig) كوڟا ماڎييون (Pégon) ꦏꦸꦛꦩꦝꦶꦪꦸꦤ꧀ (Hånåcåråkå)
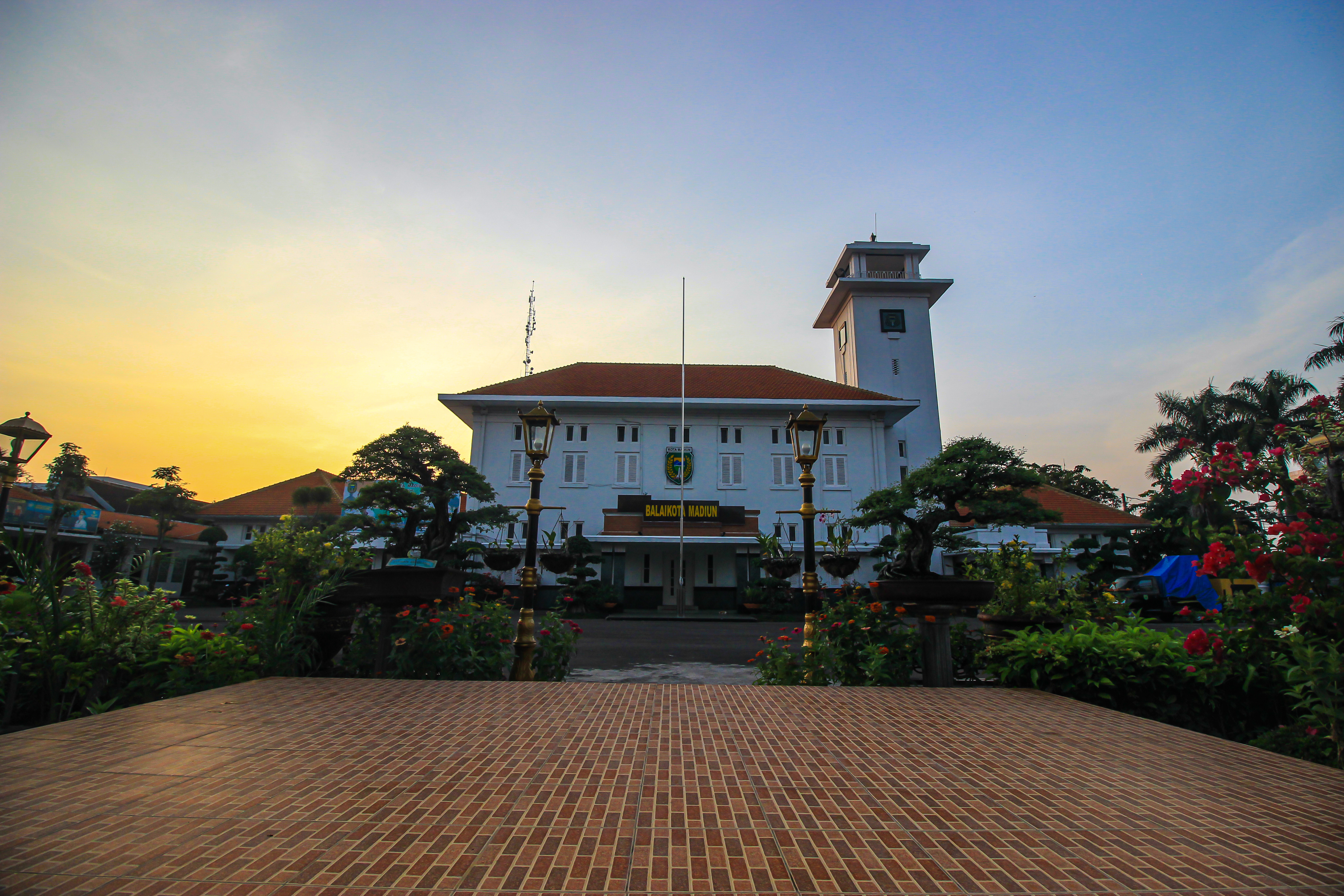
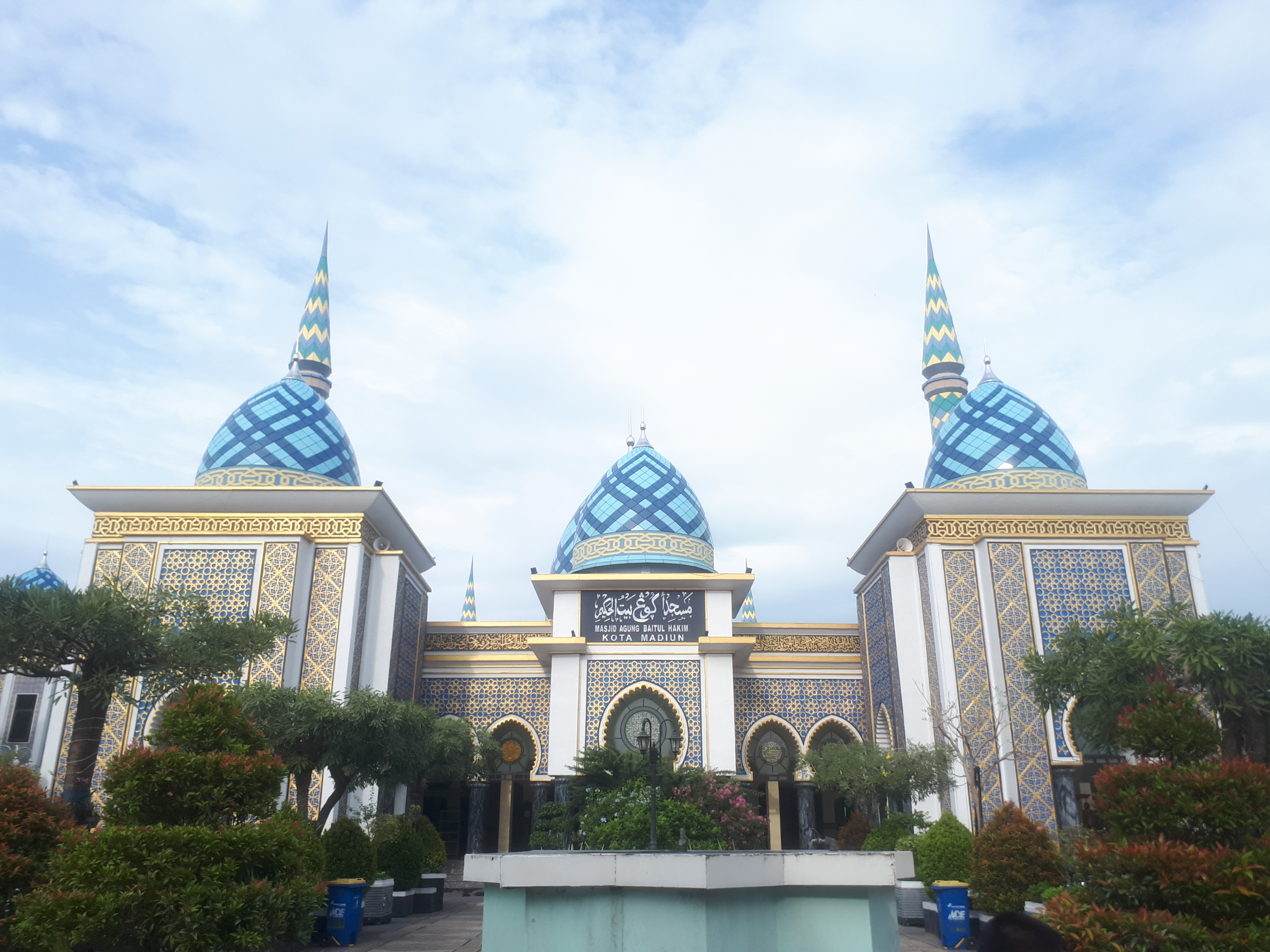
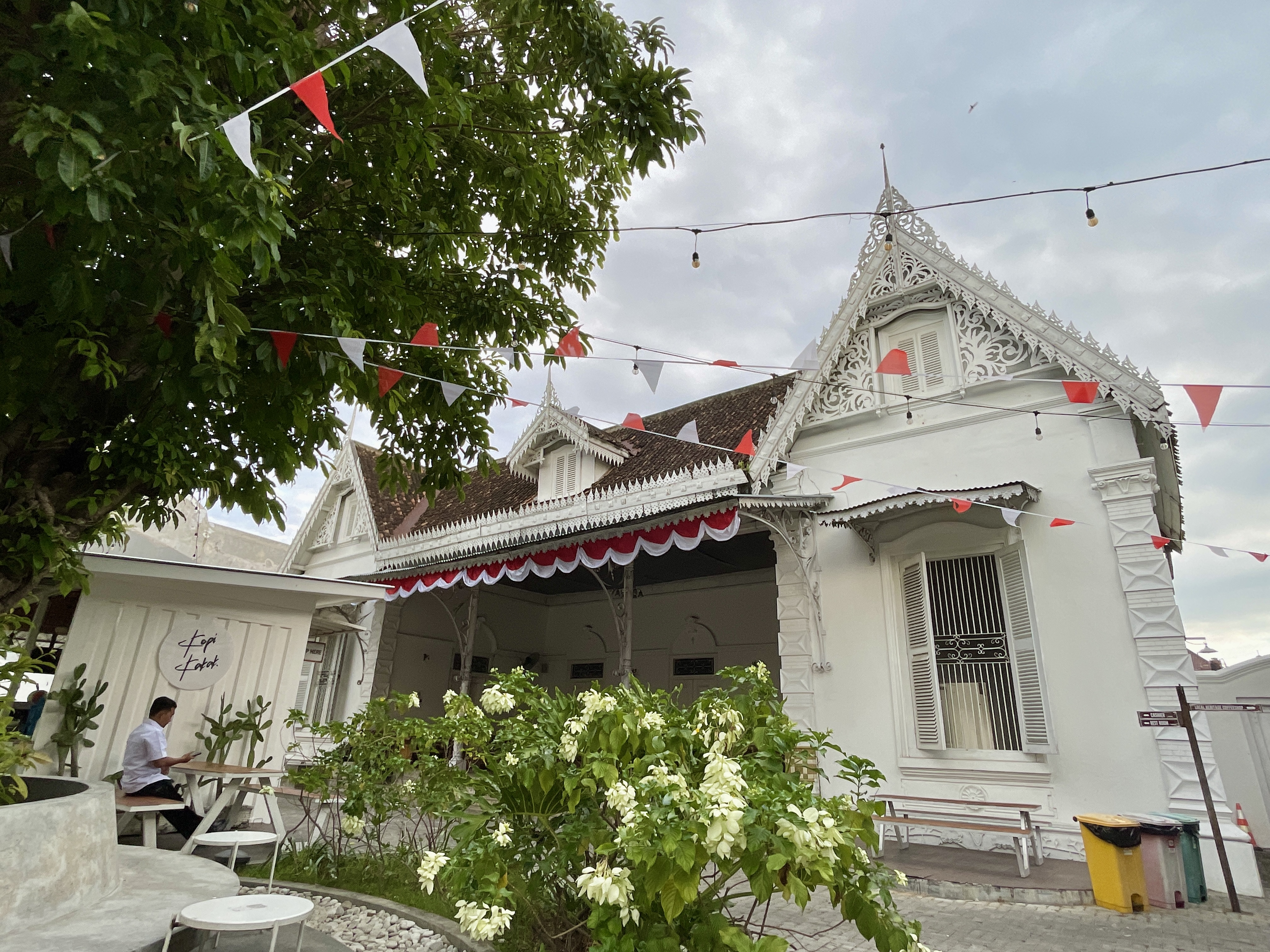
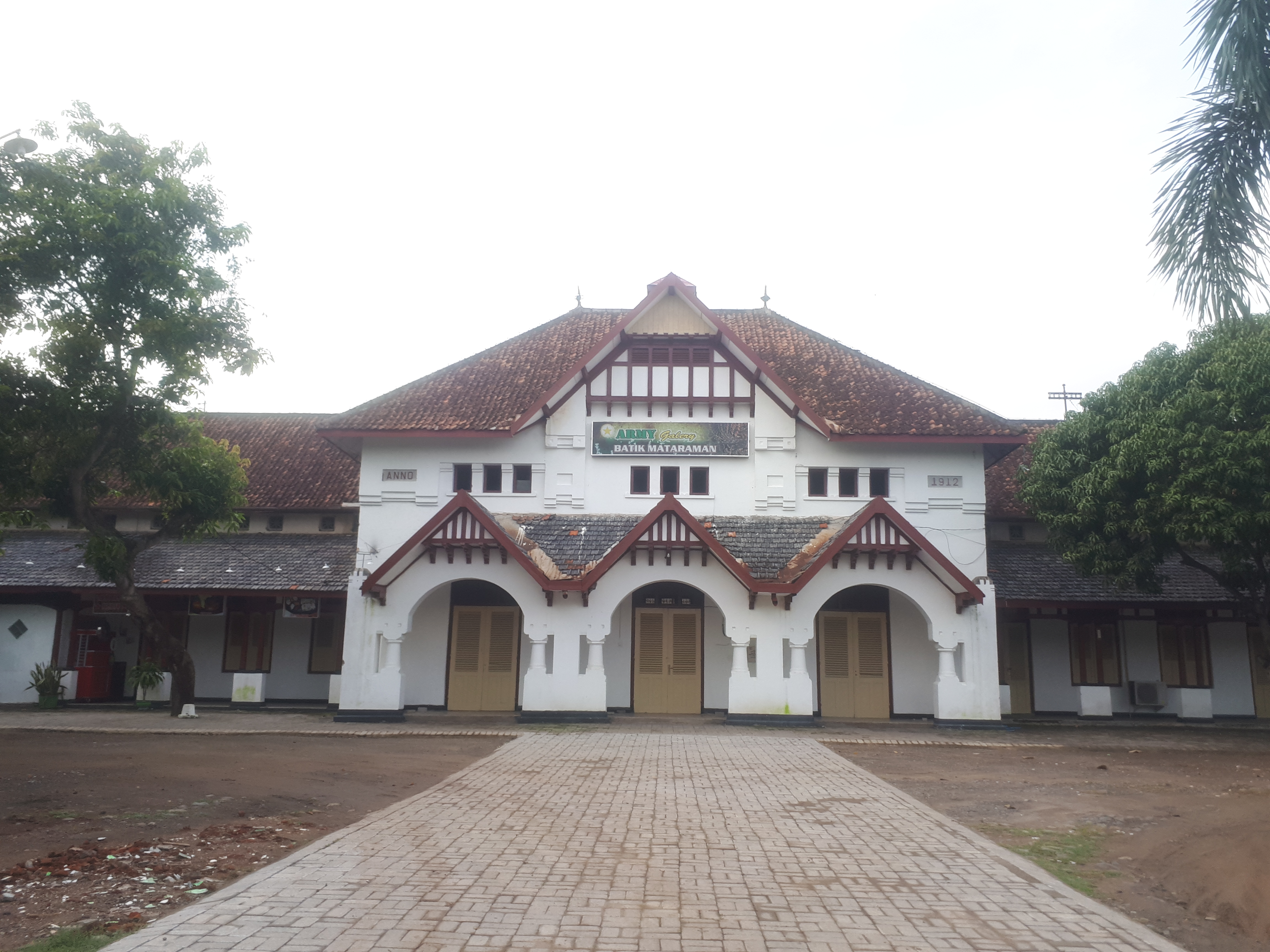
- From clockwise top: Madiun city hall, Baitul Hakim mosque, Former house of Kapitein Tjina Njoo Swie Lian, Bosbow building

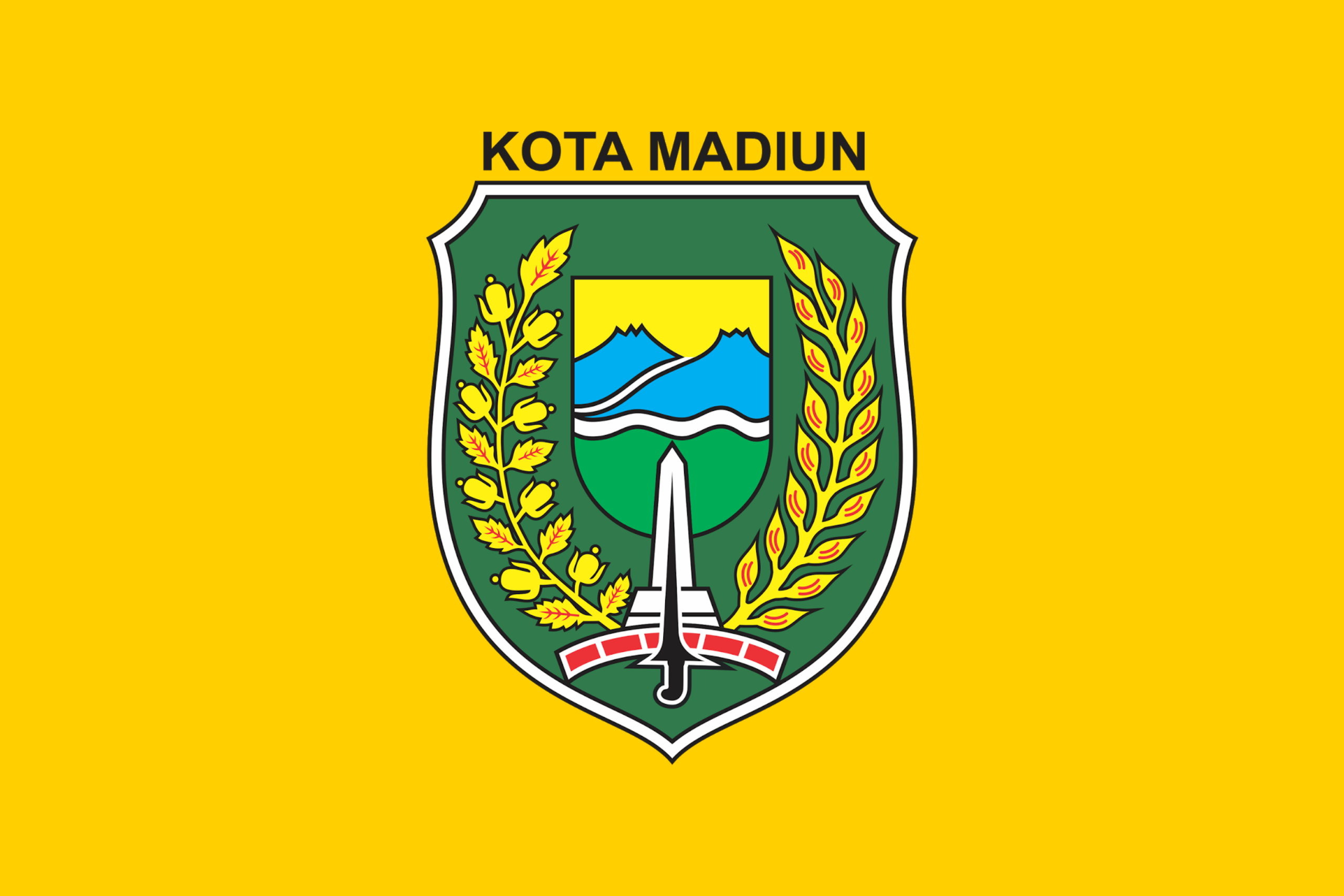
- Flag Coat of arms
- Nicknames: Kota Gadis (City of Girls)
- Mottoes: Madiun Bangkit "Madiun Rises"; Bersih, Aman, Nyaman, Gagah, Kuat, Indah, dan Tenteram (Clean, Safe, Comfortable, Brave, Strong, Beautiful, and Peaceful)
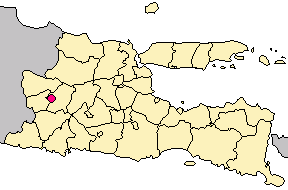
- Location within East Java

- Location in Java and Indonesia Madiun (Indonesia)
- Coordinates: 7°37′48″S 111°31′23″E
- Country: Indonesia
- Province: East Java
- Established: 20 June 1918
- City Status: 14 August 1950

Government
  - Type: Mayor–council government
  - Mayor: F. Bagus Panuntun
  - Vice Mayor: F. Bagus Panuntun

Area
  - Total: 33.23 km^{2} (12.83 sq mi)
- Elevation: 65 m (213 ft)

Population (mid 2025)
  - Total: 200,653
  - Density: 6,038/km^{2} (15,640/sq mi)
- Time zone: UTC+7 (Indonesia Western Time)
- Area code: (+62) 351
- HDI (2023): ▲0.837 (2023); Very High
- Website: madiunkota.go.id

Madiun (Javanese: ꦑꦸꦛꦩꦝꦶꦪꦸꦤ꧀, romanized: Kutha Madhiun) is city in the western part of East Java, Indonesia, known for its agricultural center. The city has been administratively separate from the surrounding Madiun Regency since the formation of the two bodies in 1950, but the city remained the seat of the regency administration until 2010. Madiun is commonly known as "Kota Gadis", which is an acronym for "Trading, Education and Industrial City" in Indonesian and is also sometimes known as Milaan van Java in the Dutch language.

Madiun, located 169 kilometres (105 mi) southwest of Surabaya and 38 kilometres (24 mi) southeast of Ngawi, covers an area of 33.23 square kilometres (12.83 sq mi), and had a population of 170,964 at the 2010 Census and 195,175 at the 2020 Census; the latest official estimate (as of mid 2025) is 200,653 (comprising 98,485 males and 102,168 females). This city is an average of 63 metres (207 ft) above sea level and lies on the Madiun River, a tributary of the Bengawan Solo River. It is surrounded by a number of mountains, including Mount Wilis (2,169 m (7,116 ft)) to the east, to the south the Kapur Selatan range (500–1,000 m (1,600–3,300 ft)) and to the west Mount Lawu (3,285 m (10,778 ft)). Madiun has an average temperature of 20–35 °C (68–95 °F).

== Administrative districts ==
The city is divided into three districts (kecamatan), tabulated below with their areas and their population totals from the 2010 Census and 2020 Census, together with the official estimates for mid 2025. The table also includes the locations of the district administrative centres, the number of administrative villages (urban kelurahan) in each district, and its postal codes.

Kode Wilayah	Name of District (kecamatan)	Area in km^{2}	Pop'n census 2010	Pop'n census 2020	Pop'n estimate mid 2025	No. of villages	Post codes
35.77.02	Manguharjo	10.04	48,906	57,779	59,715	9	63121 – 63129
35.77.03	Taman	12.46	72,667	83,698	85,316	9	63131 – 63139
35.77.01	Kartoharjo	10.73	49,391	53,698	55,622	9	63111 – 63119
	Totals	33.23	170,964	195,175	200,653	27	

The names of the kelurahan in each district are :

- Manguharjo : Madiun Lor, Manguharjo, Nambangan Kidul, Nambangan Lor, Ngegong, Pangongangan, Patihan, Sogaten, Winongo
- Taman : Banjarejo, Demangan, Josenan, Kejuron, Kuncen, Mojorejo, Manisrejo, Pandean, Taman
- Kartoharjo : Kanigoro, Kelun, Kartoharjo, Klegen, Oro-Oro Ombo, Pilangbango, Rejomulyo, Sukosari, Tawangrejo

== Madiun Affair ==
Madiun was the site of a noted uprising in 1948 by elements of the Communist Party of Indonesia (PKI), the "Madiun Affair". After the signing of the Renville Agreement that year, guerrilla units and militias under the influence of PKI were ordered to disband. In Madiun a group of PKI militia refused to disarm and were killed in September. The killings sparked a violent uprising. Army sources claimed that the PKI had announced the proclamation of the "Soviet Republic of Indonesia" on 18 September with Musso as its president and Amir Sjarifuddin as its prime minister.

The uprising was suppressed by republican troops. On 30 September, Madiun was taken over by republican troops of the Silwangi Division. Thousands of party cadres were killed and 36,000 were imprisoned. Amongst the executed PKi members were several leaders including Muso killed on 31 October, allegedly while trying to escape from prison. Other PKI leaders such as D.N. Aidit went into exile in China.

== Climate ==
Madiun has a tropical monsoon climate (Köppen Am) with moderate to little rainfall from June to October and heavy rainfall from November to May.

Climate data for Madiun
Month	Jan	Feb	Mar	Apr	May	Jun	Jul	Aug	Sep	Oct	Nov	Dec	Year
Mean daily maximum °C (°F)	29.4 (84.9)	29.4 (84.9)	29.9 (85.8)	30.1 (86.2)	30.4 (86.7)	30.6 (87.1)	30.9 (87.6)	31.6 (88.9)	32.8 (91.0)	33.0 (91.4)	31.6 (88.9)	30.0 (86.0)	30.8 (87.5)
Daily mean °C (°F)	25.5 (77.9)	25.4 (77.7)	25.7 (78.3)	26.0 (78.8)	26.1 (79.0)	26.0 (78.8)	25.9 (78.6)	26.2 (79.2)	27.1 (80.8)	27.6 (81.7)	27.0 (80.6)	26.0 (78.8)	26.2 (79.2)
Mean daily minimum °C (°F)	23.1 (73.6)	23.1 (73.6)	23.1 (73.6)	23.2 (73.8)	22.8 (73.0)	22.3 (72.1)	21.8 (71.2)	21.7 (71.1)	22.8 (73.0)	23.8 (74.8)	23.9 (75.0)	23.4 (74.1)	22.9 (73.2)
Average rainfall mm (inches)	429 (16.9)	402 (15.8)	409 (16.1)	276 (10.9)	126 (5.0)	71 (2.8)	41 (1.6)	21 (0.8)	43 (1.7)	130 (5.1)	287 (11.3)	413 (16.3)	2,648 (104.3)
Average precipitation days	21	19	20	19	13	8	5	4	5	12	18	20	164
Average relative humidity (%)	88	89	88	87	83	78	73	68	67	70	79	86	80
Source: Climate-Data.org

== Transportation ==
Madiun is served by Madiun railway station.

== Road network ==
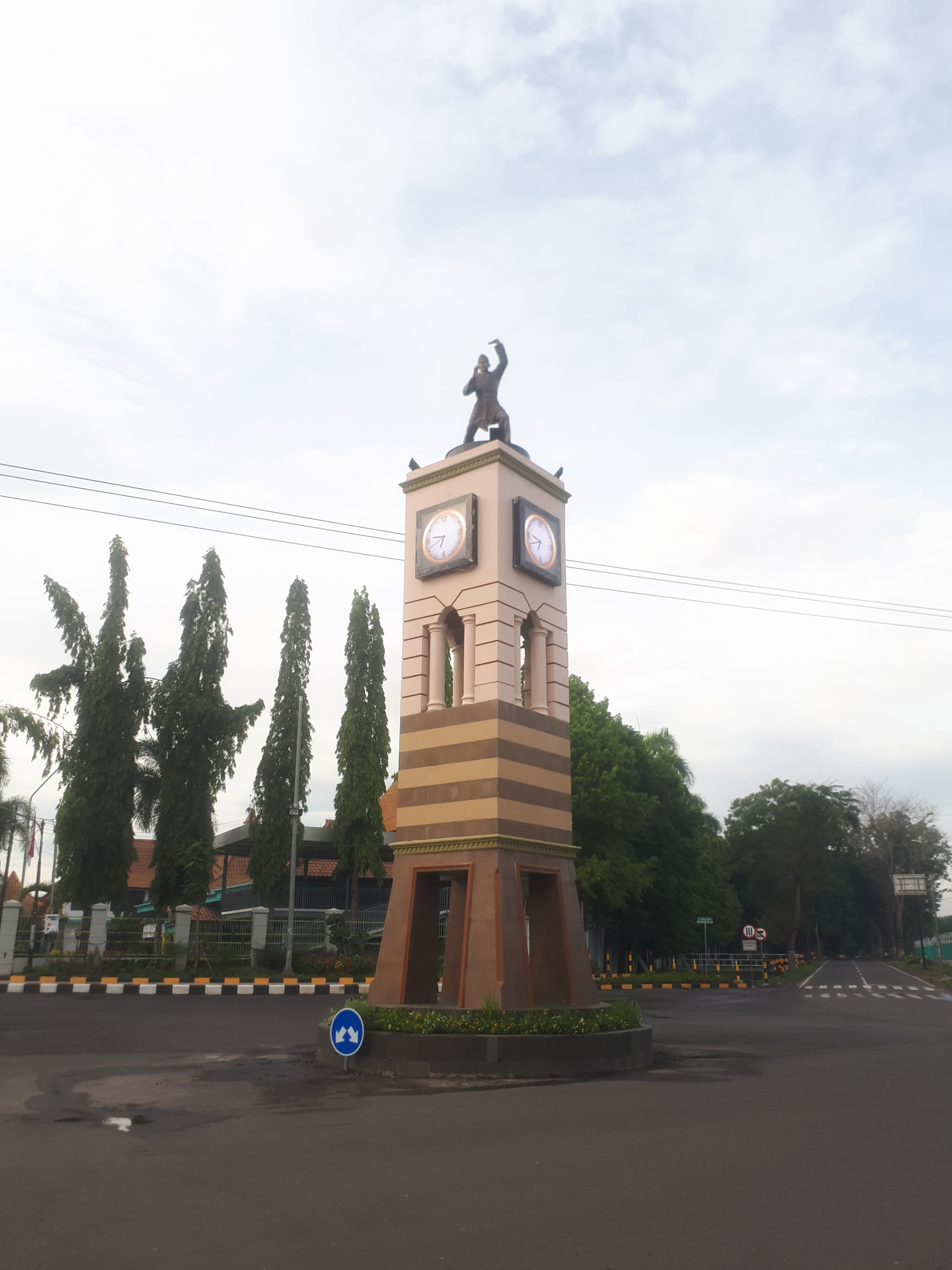
Fighter monument roundabout

Madiun is accessible via the Solo-Kertosono Toll Road in the north and Indonesian National Route 20 that passes through the city.

Additionally, Jl. Raya Geger - Madiun conveniently connects Madiun to places south of it, such as Krandegan or Ponorogo Regency.

== See also ==
- Madiun Affair
- Indonesian National Revolution
