= Gedong Songo =

Hindu temple in Indonesia

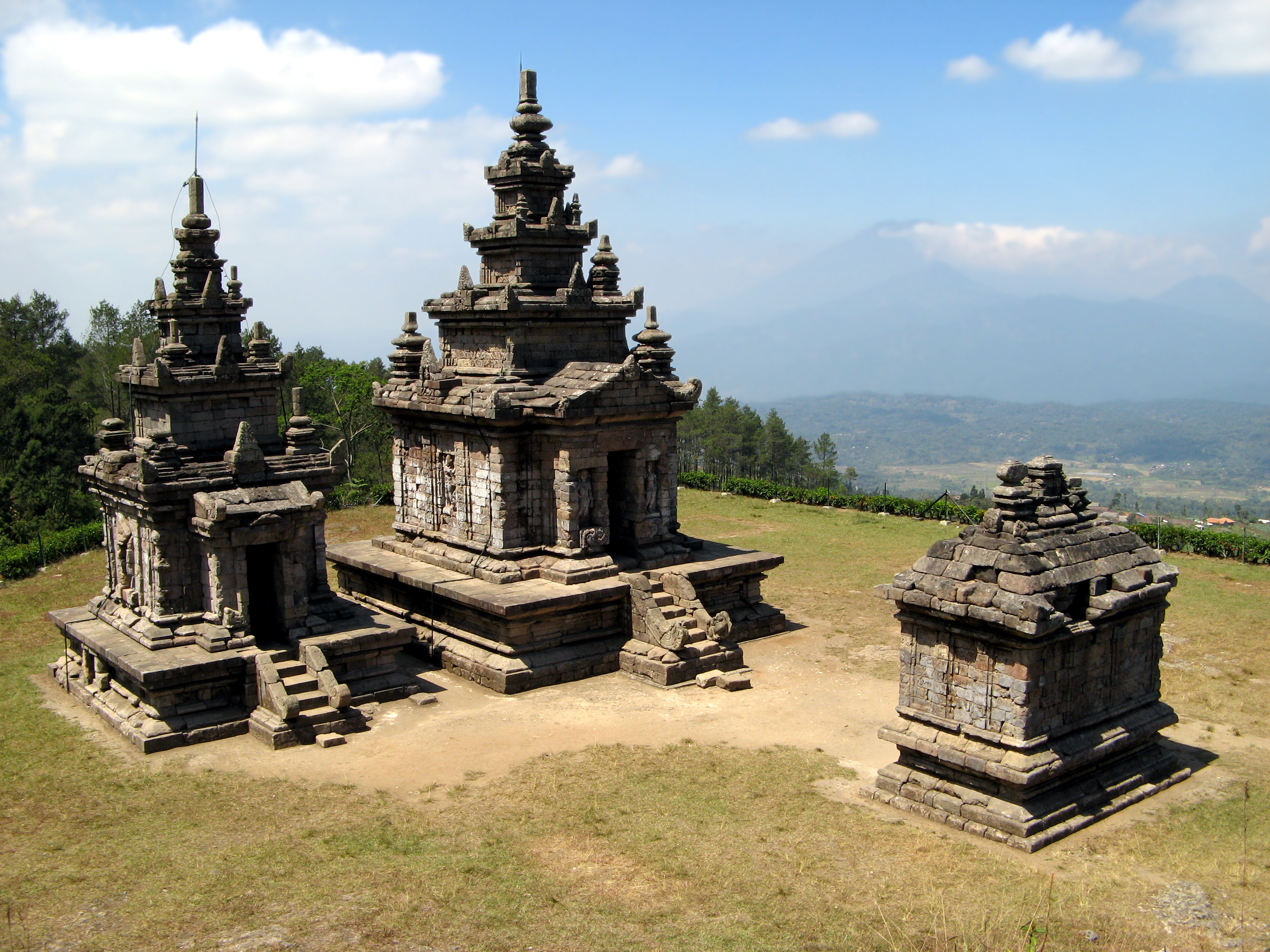
- A view of three of the temples and the scenery below

- Location within Java

Religion
- Affiliation: Hinduism
- Deity: Shiva

Location
- Location: Bandungan, Semarang Regency
- State: Java
- Country: Indonesia
- Coordinates: 7°12′30.6″S 110°20′30.4″E

Architecture
- Completed: 8th–9th century

Gedong Songo (Indonesian: Candi Gedong Songo) is a group of Hindu temples located near Bandungan, Semarang Regency, in north Central Java, Indonesia. It is variously dated between the 8th and 9th-century. Built around a 1,270 metres (4,170 ft) hill near Mount Ungaran, it consist of five Gedong (temple group) – two on the east side of the hill, two towards the north and one to the west. (Note: If the temples below the hill are included, the Gedong Songo consist of seven temple groups.) These total nine temples, all dedicated to Shiva and Parvati. The Gedong Songo complex is one of 110 sites in central Java with Hindu temple structures or remains, and one of 21 in Semarang area, states Veronique Degroot. (Note: Degroot gives a list of temple sites and remains in central Java known as of 1972. This count partly consolidates the temple groups counted separately by Krom in early 20th-century, a pioneering survey sponsored in part by a Dutch initiative. If Buddhist-Hindu structures in the region are included, the count would be significantly higher.)

The site was originally built during the early period of the Mataram kingdom of Central Java. Similar to the Dieng temples on the Dieng Plateau, Gedong Songo was erected out of volcanic stone and the two complexes represent some of the oldest Hindu structures in Java. According to Vogler – a scholar of Indonesian architecture and history, the Gedong Songo were built in the 9th century, about a hundred years after Phase III Javanese temples such as Candi Arjuna, Sewu, Semar, Lumbung and other temples. In contrast, Soekmono dates these to the 8th century and places the Dieng temples to the 7th century. Williams, Dumarcay and others place the Gedong Songo temples closer to 780–830 CE. The Dieng and Gedong Songo temples are among the earliest phases of Hindu temples built on the Java island, they predate Borobudur and Prambanan, and show considerable influence from Indian Hindu temple architecture.

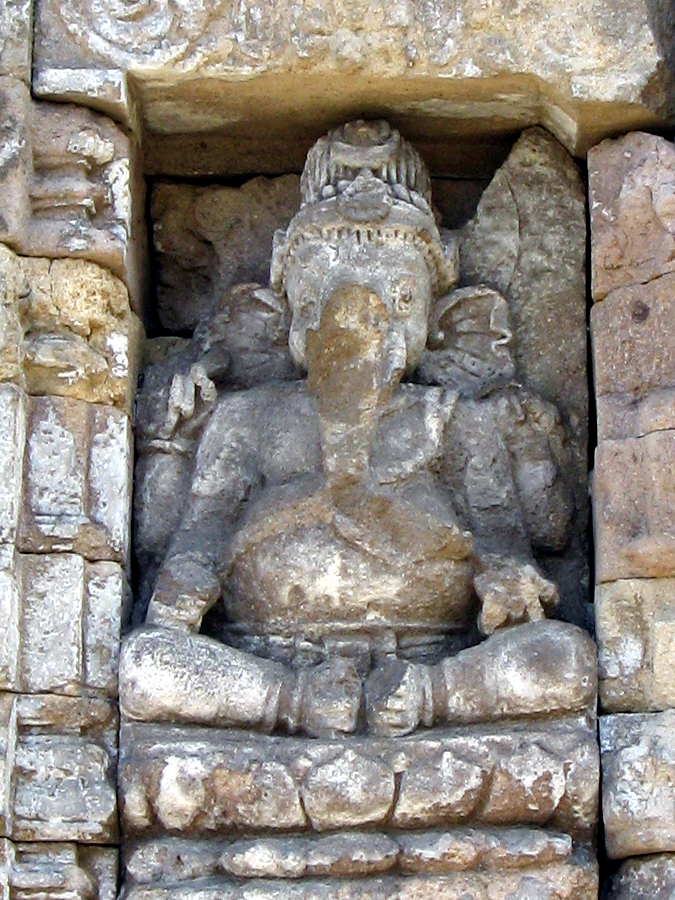
Ganesha relief at Gedong Songo III

The temples of Gedong Songo reflect a similar architecture to those on the Dieng Plateau, though they have less variation in form than them. Gedong Songo displays more emphasis on plinth and cornice mouldings. At Gedong Songo 3, an entrance is outlined by a vestibule that is decorated by guardian figures. Gedong Songo III is also a Shiva temple, one paired with a facing Nandi shrine and a Parvati shrine next to the Shiva shrine. Gedong Songo I is the oldest, with a square plan – an architecture that is predominant in Hindu and Buddhist-Hindu sites of central Java. However, the Gedong Songo II through V temples are unusual and among the notable exceptions, as they have a square sanctum, but the plinth base has been extended for a porch, which gives it a rectangular shape. The architects of the later groups of Gedong Songo temples explored a design beyond those found in Dieng group, and others such as Sewu, Srikandi, Puntadewa, Sambisari, and Ngawen where a porch was added by building a larger base.

Gedong Songo temples, nevertheless, use the square principle, including the vertical direction. The cella are cubes (garbhagriya). Further, the same principle is applied in the multi-storeyed superstructure (vimana, shikhara). The Aihole- and Pattadakal-like experiments with Hindu temple architecture that is evident in the Dieng groups (Arjuna, Gatotkaca, Bima), became established in Gedong Songo as a Javanese style to inspire the numerous Hindu and Buddhist-Hindu temples that were thereafter built in central Java. The architecture and design follow the Indian sastras (Sanskrit texts on architecture), but no similar Indian prototype is as yet known to establish a direct connection between the Hindu temples in India and those in central Java, including the Dieng group and the Gedong Songo. This has led to two major competing conjectures as to who built the original sets of temples in Java, and how did the systematic knowledge, schools and skill set to build ever more complex mega-temples emerge in Java. One hypothesis, supported by Jordaan, states that Indian artisans and architects were invited to Java, who then inspired the traditions and schools here. The other hypothesis, supported by Bosch, states that Javanese pilgrims went to India between the 7th and 8th-century, they saw the temples there and then created a version best suited to the materials and terrain in Java. It is unclear which of these, and other variant conjectures, may be true and the historic trajectory of the central Javanese temple architecture remains contested.

The Gedong Songo temples and other regional Hindu-Buddhist temples near it were active in the 14th and 15th-century, as evidenced by an inscription dated 1382 CE discovered in this temples complex, as well as others in the region that date to 1449 and 1452 CE. However, it is unclear whether they were active continuously, or periodically re-occupied between the 8th and 15th-centuries. (Note: These are not the oldest inscriptions here. The Sojomerto inscription in early Javanese language (Old Malay) found here dates to 800–825 CE. Nearby are Sanskrit inscriptions of Tuk Mas from mid-7th century, of Hampran from c. 750 CE near Salatiga, of Blado from mid-8th century as well near Batang.)

The site was rediscovered by colonial era Dutch archaeologists during the 19th century. All temples then were badly damaged and ruins scattered around the hill. The Gedong Songo complex has been considerably restored in recent decades.

== Gallery ==
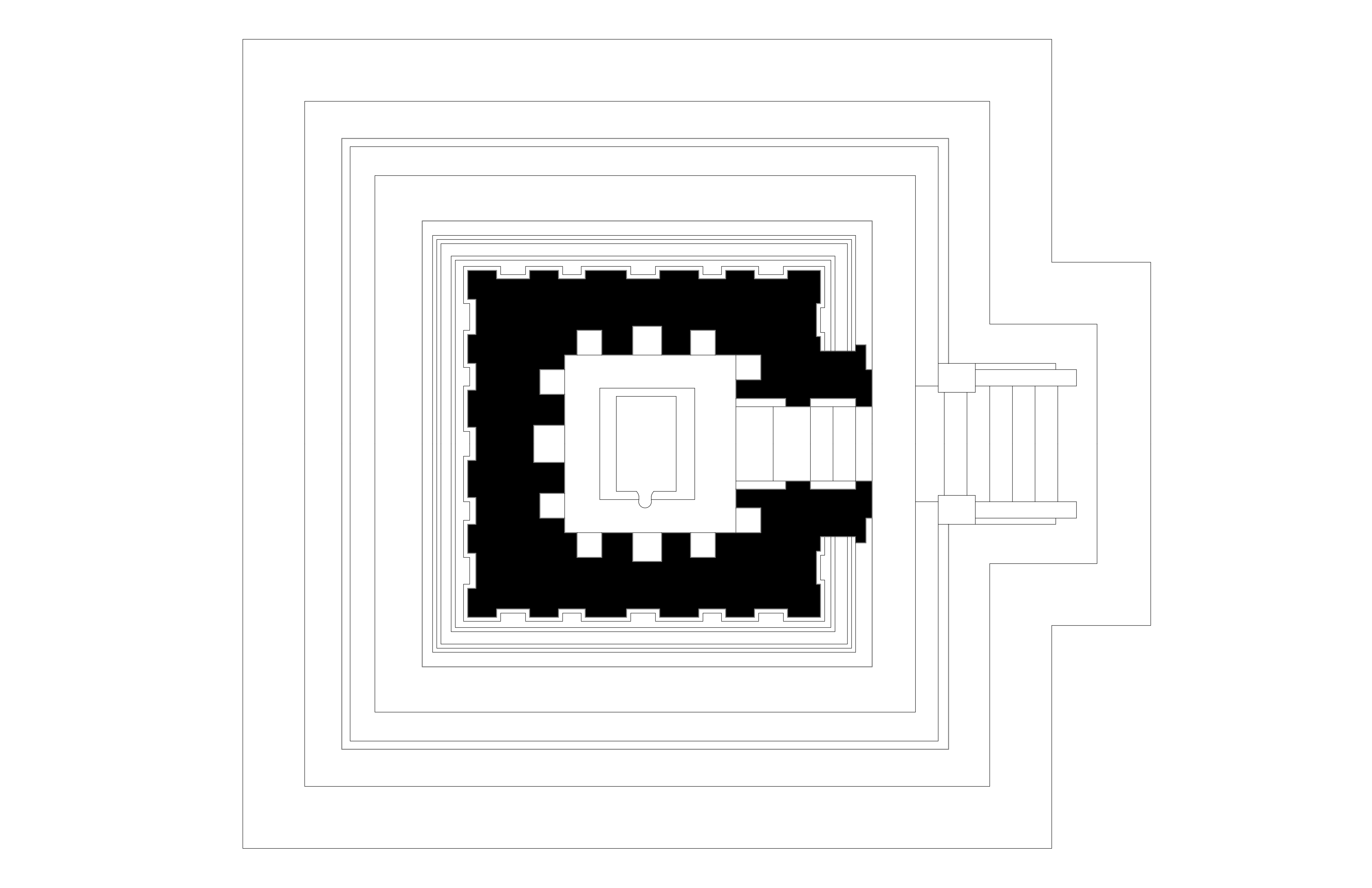
Floor plan of Gedong Songo-I, one of the nine temples

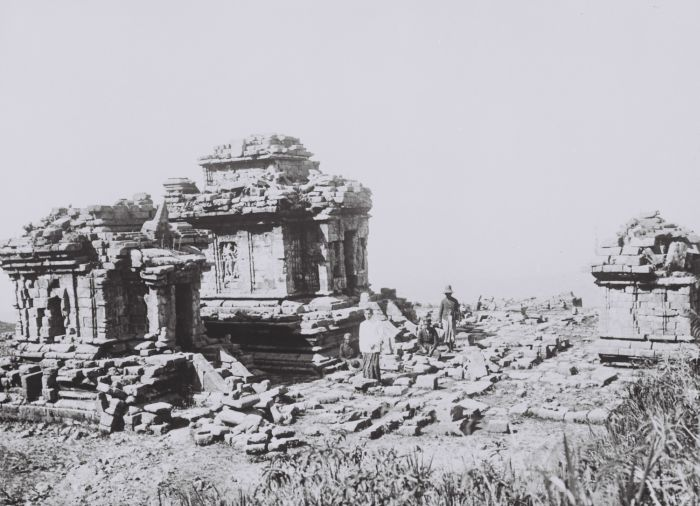
1921 photo of Temple III group ruins, before restoration

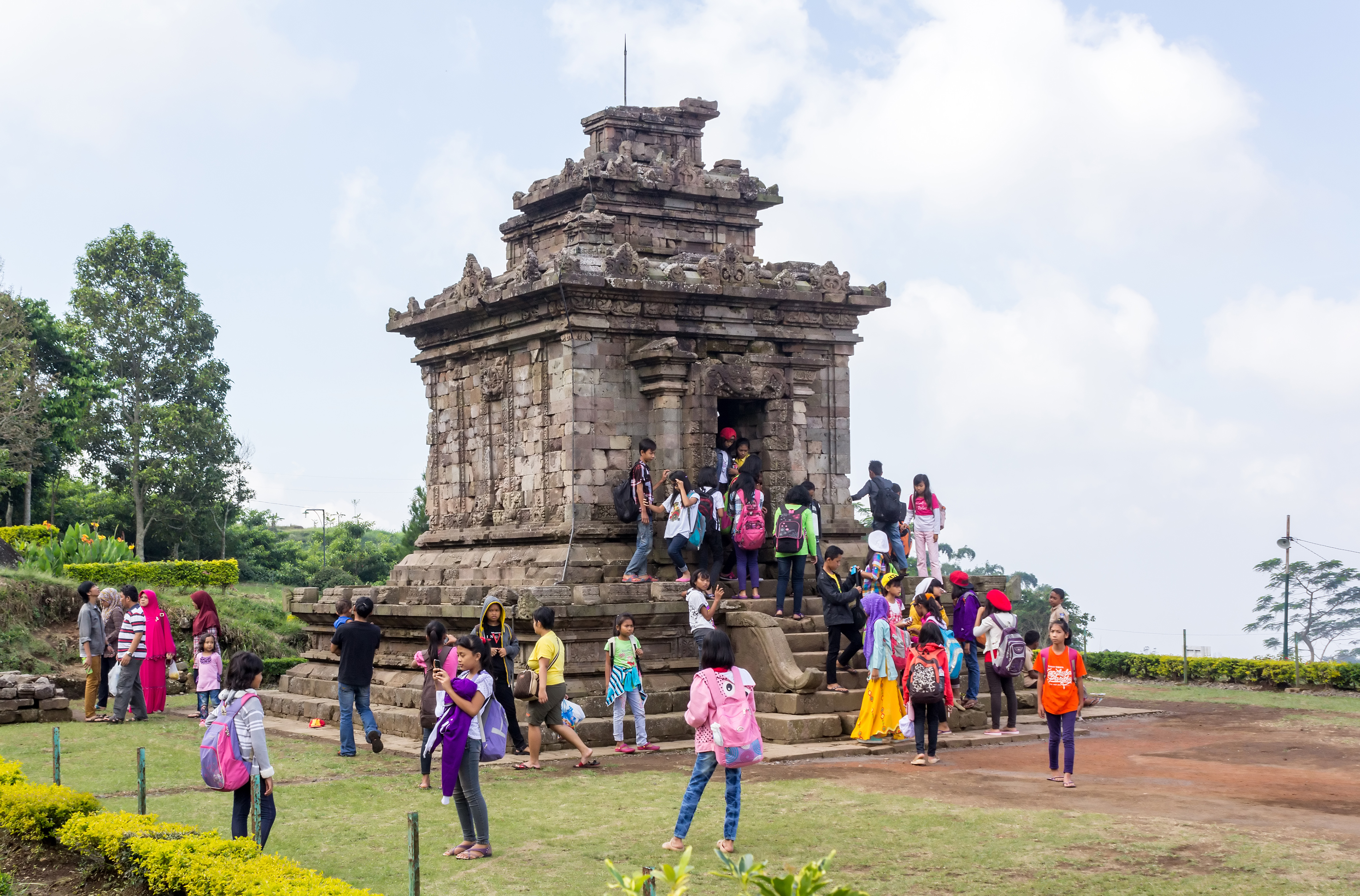
Gedong Songo I

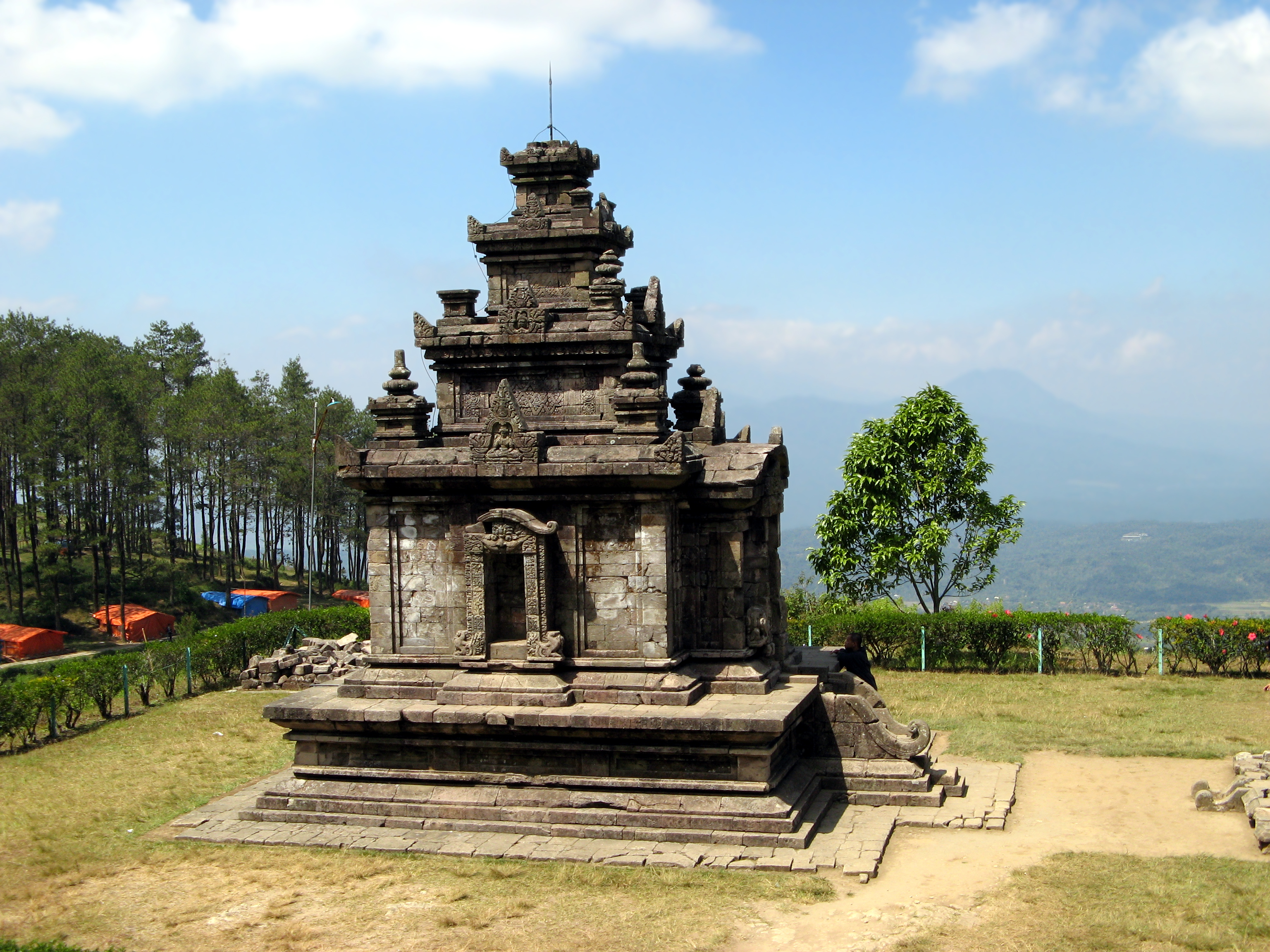
Gedong Songo II

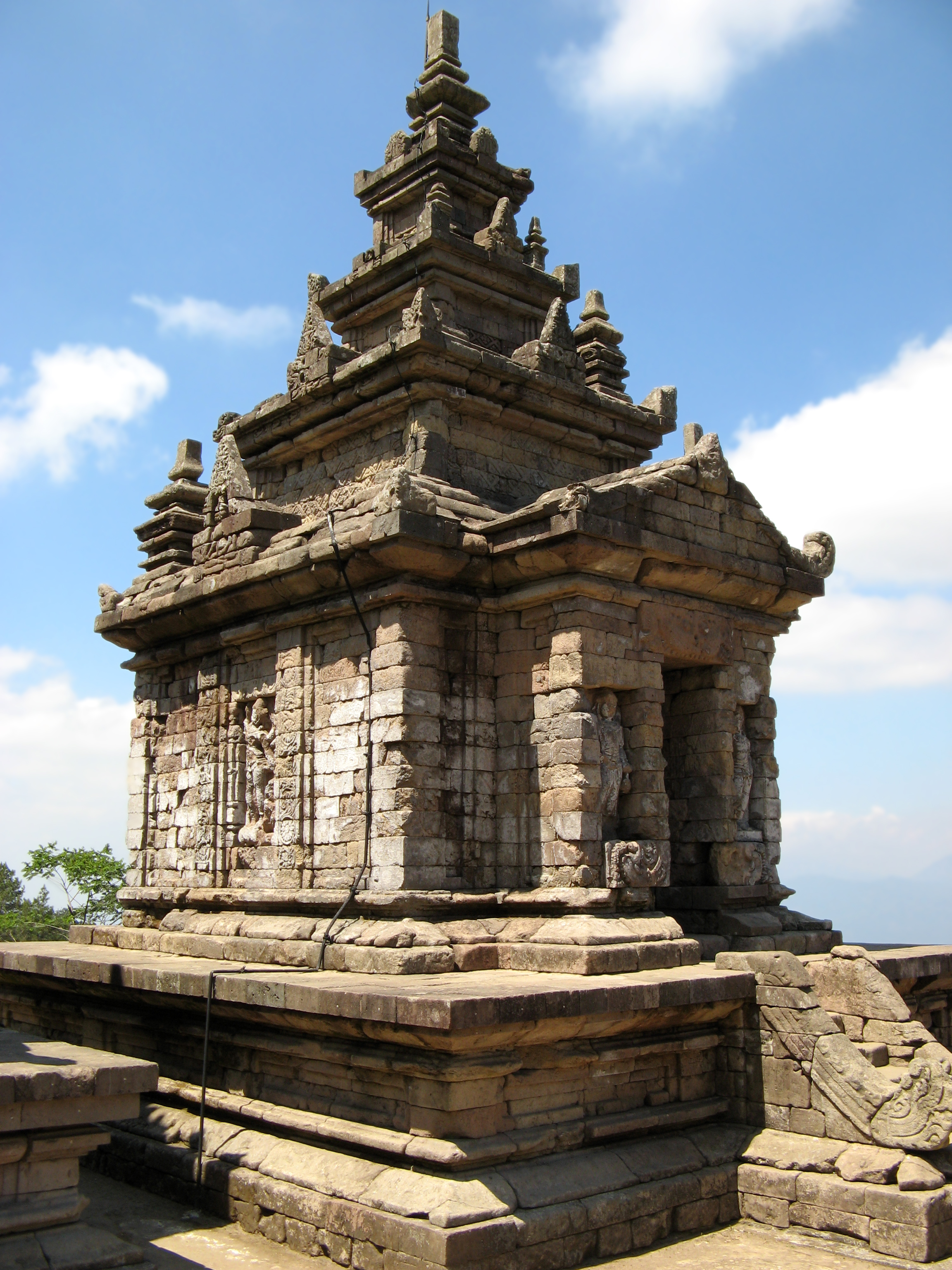
Temple III

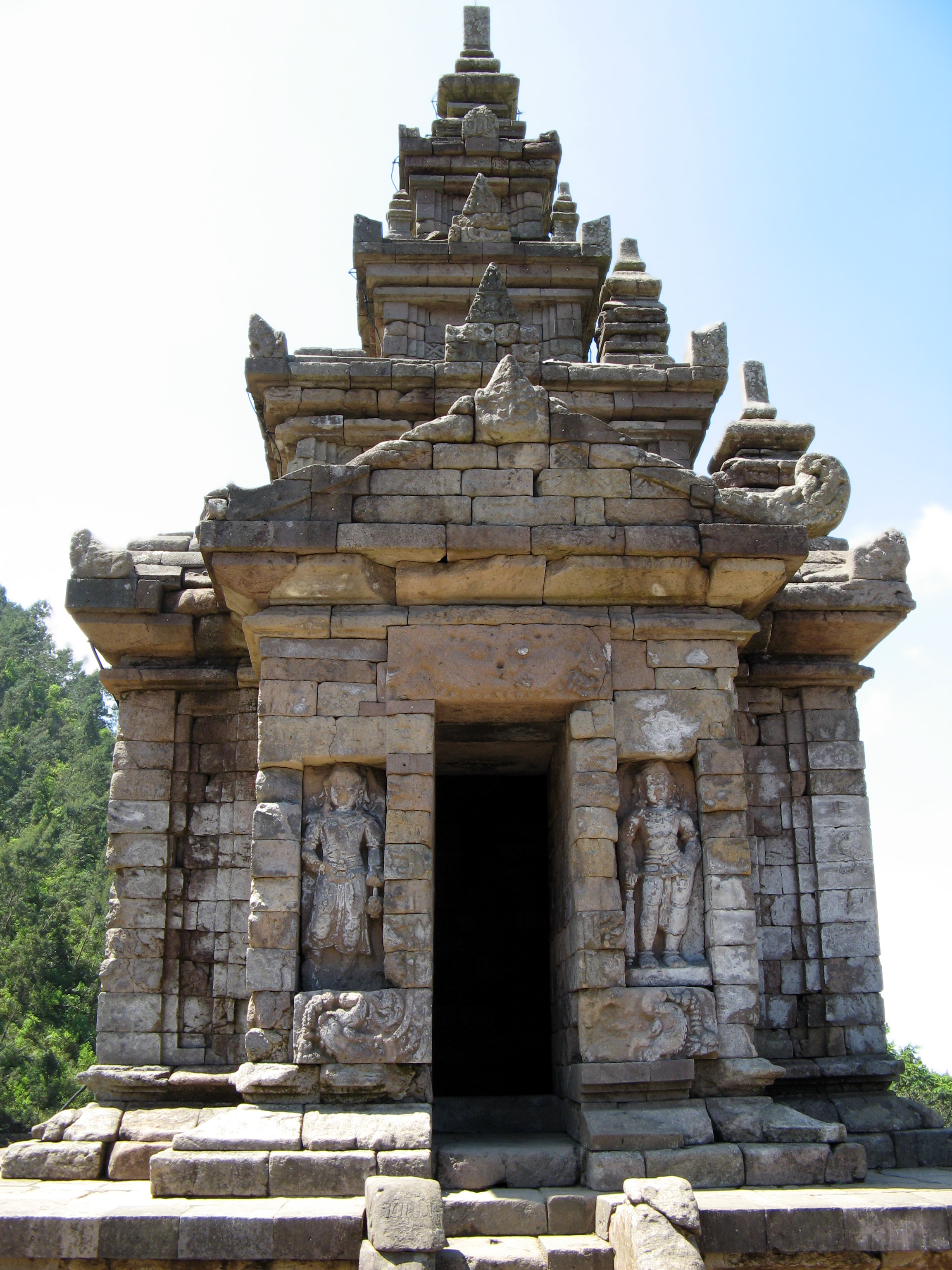
Entrance to Temple III

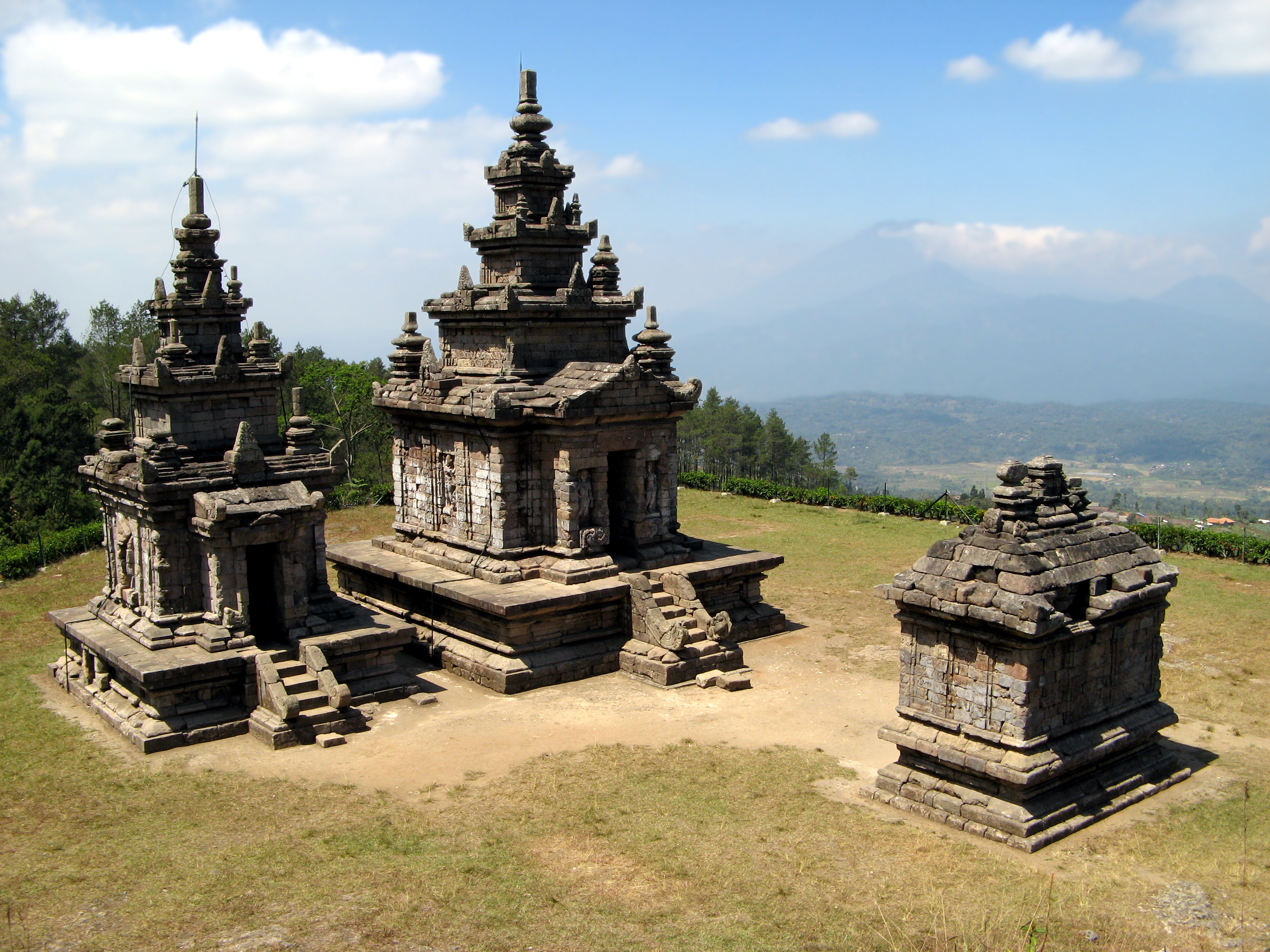
Gedong Songo III

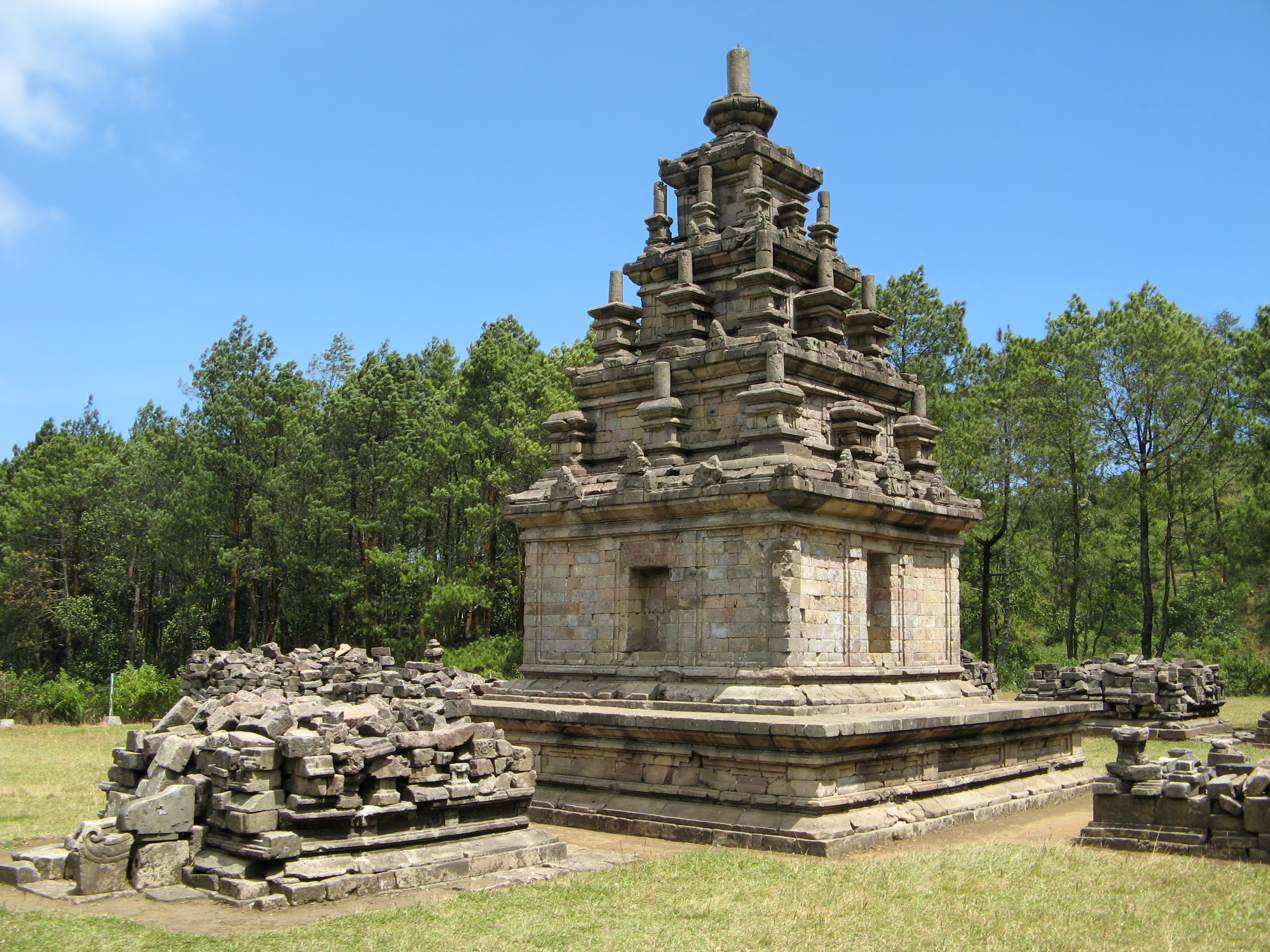
Gedong Songo IV

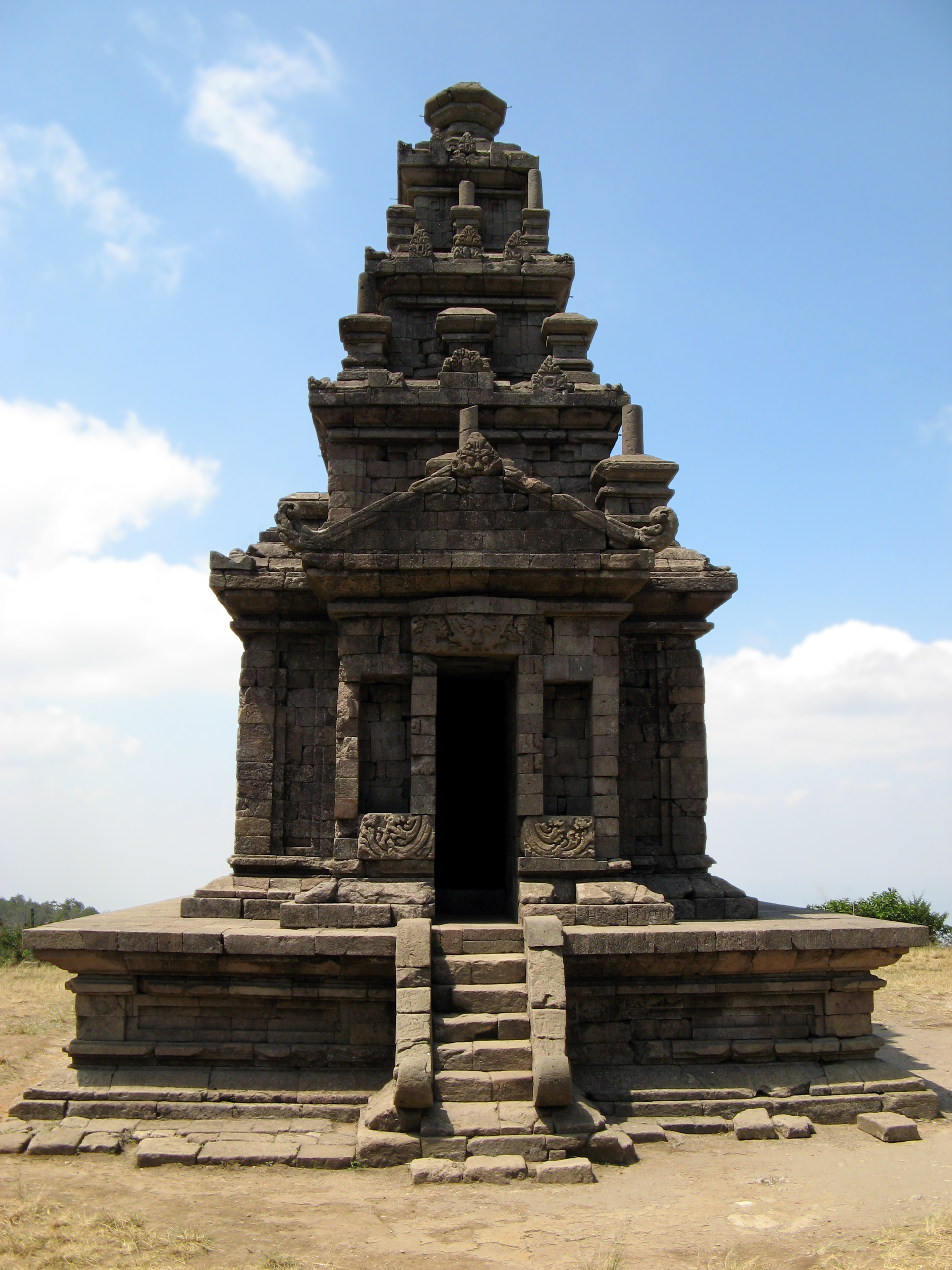
Gedong Songo V

=== See also ===
- Candi of Indonesia
