= 1957 Indonesian local elections =

Largest political party (seat-wise) in the regional councils of each city/regency following the local elections

Local elections were held in Indonesia—specifically in Java and South Sumatra—throughout 1957. They were held to elect members of regional councils for each province and city/regency. The Communist Party of Indonesia (PKI) emerged as the largest party in Java, becoming the only major party to improve its results relative to the 1955 election. The PKI's strong showing compounded political unease outside of Java as many feared that the PKI could dominate the next elections scheduled for 1959. This resulted in its cancellation by the Indonesian Army, with the support of President Sukarno, and a subsequent move towards guided democracy.

== Background ==
In 1956, transitional regional assemblies were established, with composition corresponding to party vote share in the 1955 elections. The following year, Law No. 1/1957 provided for three levels of local government – province, regency and village. The directly elected province and regency governments would elect a regional executive, the Regional Administrative Council (Indonesian: Dewan Pemerintah Daerah, DPD), which would have a composition in line with local parties’ vote shares. The DPD chairman would be a regional executive, and would have to be approved by the government in Jakarta. There would be Wide-ranging regional autonomy, which would mean and greatly increased influence for the political parties. Due to the ongoing regional rebellions, elections could only be held in Java, South Sumatra and Riau (and Kalimantan in 1958).

== Campaign ==
Except for the PKI, the campaign was rather lacklustre campaign, partly because the main issue at time was the regional rebellions. As it was clear that regional elections would not solve this problem, they were seen as irrelevant. There were also restrictions on party activities because Indonesia was then under martial law, which had been declared in mid-March 1957. In East Java, for example, the military allowed only four days of campaigning. Rallies and demonstrations were monitored.

In addition, the parties had spent significant amounts on the 1955 elections, and some had to rely on remaining funds. The PKI only party with plenty of funds. The parties focused on areas where they had done well in 1955, thus Masjumi concentrated their efforts in Jakarta, and West Java, the Nahdlatul Ulama on East Java and the Indonesian National Party (PNI) across Java. As the PKI had never served in cabinets, it escaped blame for government shortcomings. The party used a slogan urging people to vote PKI “to carry out the Konsepsi”, meaning President Sukarno's concept of an inclusive government reaching all decisions by consensus. The communists also attacked other parties for their corruption. The authorities arrested senor PNI, Masjumi and NU officials for corruption, but no PKI figures. The PKI campaigned on giving land to the poor, but other parties could not counter this as sometimes the land belonged to their leaders or financial backers. From May 6–11, Soviet head of state Voroshilov paid a state visit to Indonesia, and Soviet flags were widely displayed, which may have assisted the PKI's campaign.

== Election results ==
=== Jakarta ===
The election in Jakarta was held 22 June, and was contested by 43 parties. There was a lower turnout than the 1955 elections, possibly because of rain and problems with voter cards. The turnout was approximately 70 percent, down from 75 percent in 1955. The PKI was the only party to increase its vote over the 1955 result, and it moved up from fourth to second position.

| Party | votes | % | % change from 1955 |
|---|---|---|---|
| Masjumi | 153,709 | 22.0% | -4.1% |
| Communist Party of Indonesia (PKI) | 137,305 | 19.7% | 7.1% |
| Indonesian National Party (PNI) | 124,955 | 17.9% | -1.9% |
| Nahdatul Ulama (NU) | 104,892 | 15.0% | -0.7% |
| Indonesian Islamic Union Party (PSII) | 22,717 | 3.3% | 0.2% |
| Socialist Party of Indonesia (PSI) | 20,089 | 2.9% | -1.7% |
| Indonesian Christian Party (Parkindo) | 14,583 | 2.1% | -0.2% |
| Consultative Council on Indonesian Citizenship (Baperki) | 26,642 | 3.8% | 0.3% |
| League of Supporters of Indonesian Independence (IPKI) | 9,818 | 1.4% | -0.5% |
| Catholic Party | 7,234 | 1.0% | 0.0% |
| Total | 698,575 | | |

=== Central Java ===
The PNI had won more than a third of the vote in the 1955 elections, with the PKI on over 25 percent. There was considerable tension between parties. ahead of the elections, which were held on 17 July. The turnout was approximately 85 percent. The result was a shock for PNI leaders as the PKI gained votes from PNI, reversing the positions from the 1955 elections and coming first overall.

| Party | votes | % | % change from 1955 |
|---|---|---|---|
| PKI | 2,706,893 | 31.8 | +5.9 |
| PNI | 2,235,714 | 26.3 | -8.8 |
| NU | 1,771,556 | 20.8 | +0.1 |
| Masjumi | 714,722 | 8.4 | -1.2 |

=== Yogyakarta ===
In Yogyakarta, elections were held on November 7. The PKI finished on top by a significant margin.

| Party | votes |
|---|---|
| PKI | 298,257 |
| PNI | 164,568 |
| NU | 94,012 |
| Masjumi | 118,985 |

=== East Java ===
The PNI was not as popular in East Java as it was in Central Java, and had problems with internal party strife. In the election, held on 29 July, the PKI was the only party that increased its vote, and voters appeared to switch from the PNI to the PKI. However, the NU retained its leading position. The Surabaya branch of the PNI claimed there were irregularities and called for voting there to be repeated. The Home Affairs Minister (from the PNI) Sanusi Hardjadinata agreed and ordered the vote to be held again. This took place on 25 February 1958.

| Party | Votes | % | % change from 1955 |
|---|---|---|---|
| NU | 2,999,785 | 30.4 | -3.7 |
| PKI | 2,704,523 | 27.4 | +4.1 |
| PNI | 1,899,782 | 19.2 | -3.6 |
| Masjumi | 977,443 | 9.9 | -1.3 |

=== West Java ===
In staunchly Islamic West Java, the Islamist Masjumi Party had come first in the 1955 election, and it retained this position in 1957. The PNI vote fell sharply, and again the PKI vote rose. The election was held on 10 August.

| Party | Votes | % | % change from 1955 |
|---|---|---|---|
| Masjumi | 1,841,030 | 26.1 | +0.8 |
| PKI | 1,087,269 | 15.4 | +3.5 |
| PNI | 1,055,801 | 15.0 | -7.8 |
| NU | 597,356 | 8.5 | -1.5 |

=== South Sumatra ===
By 1 December, when elections were held in South Sumatra, the PNI was in turmoil because of the results from Java. There was widespread anti-communist activity in the lead up to the vote: the military played a part in this. However, the PKI still obtained more votes than in 1955, possibly partly due to support from ethnic Javanese settlers.

| Party | Votes | % | % change from 1955 |
|---|---|---|---|
| Masjumi | 553,276 | 38.0 | -5.1 |
| PKI | 228,965 | 15.7 | +3.6 |
| PNI | 187,042 | 12.9 | -1.8 |
| NU | 113,888 | 7.8 | -0.2 |

== Aftermath ==
Vote share for the Indonesian Communist Party (PKI) in the elections for members of the regional councils of each city/regency

The huge PKI vote prompted party leader D.N. Aidit to claim that this was an increase of 45 percent over the 1955 election vote. The PKI was then able to take control of regional councils in Java and ensure the appointment of several communists as mayors. The results made dissenters outside Java more suspicious of Java, and the fear of Javanese domination of the outer islands became conflated with concerns about communism. This made it more difficult to find a solution to the disputes. It also strengthened the determination of Army leaders to destroy the PKI, and forced other parties to think seriously about why the PKI was gaining popularity, and they were not.

It seemed likely that PKI support would continue to increase, and that of other parties fall further. As no PKI members sat in cabinet, the party could not be blamed for the government's failures and corruption. These parties believed they would be unable to rectify this before elections due in 1959, and therefore did not want these elections to go ahead. Alarmed by the results, regional leaders held a national conference in September to harmonize relations between them and the central government. Delegates called for the restoration of the Sukarno-Hatta leadership, the establishment of a senate and the banning of the PKI. However, none of these demands were met. In May 1958, the army used its emergency powers to cancel the 1959 elections, with the support of Sukarno, who was keen to move towards his system of guided democracy.
