= Kodjoe =

Kodjoe is a surname. Notable people with the surname include:

- Boris Kodjoe (born 1973), Austrian-born actor of German and Ghanaian descent
- Emmanuel Kodjoe Dadzie (born 1916), Ghanaian diplomat

== See also ==
- Kodjo
- Kojo (disambiguation)
