= Centrum, Paramaribo =

Centrum
- Resort
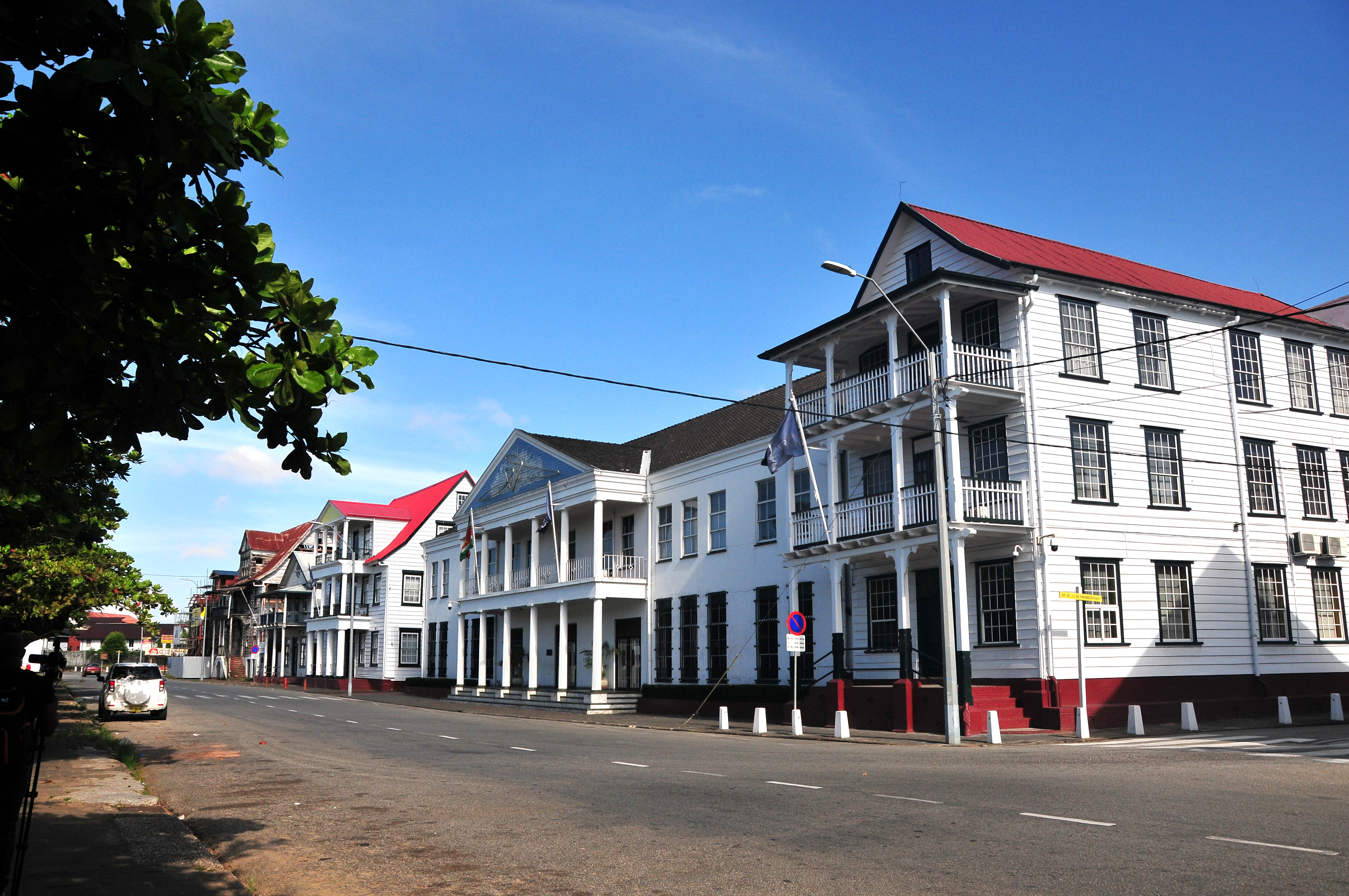
- Waterkant in Centrum

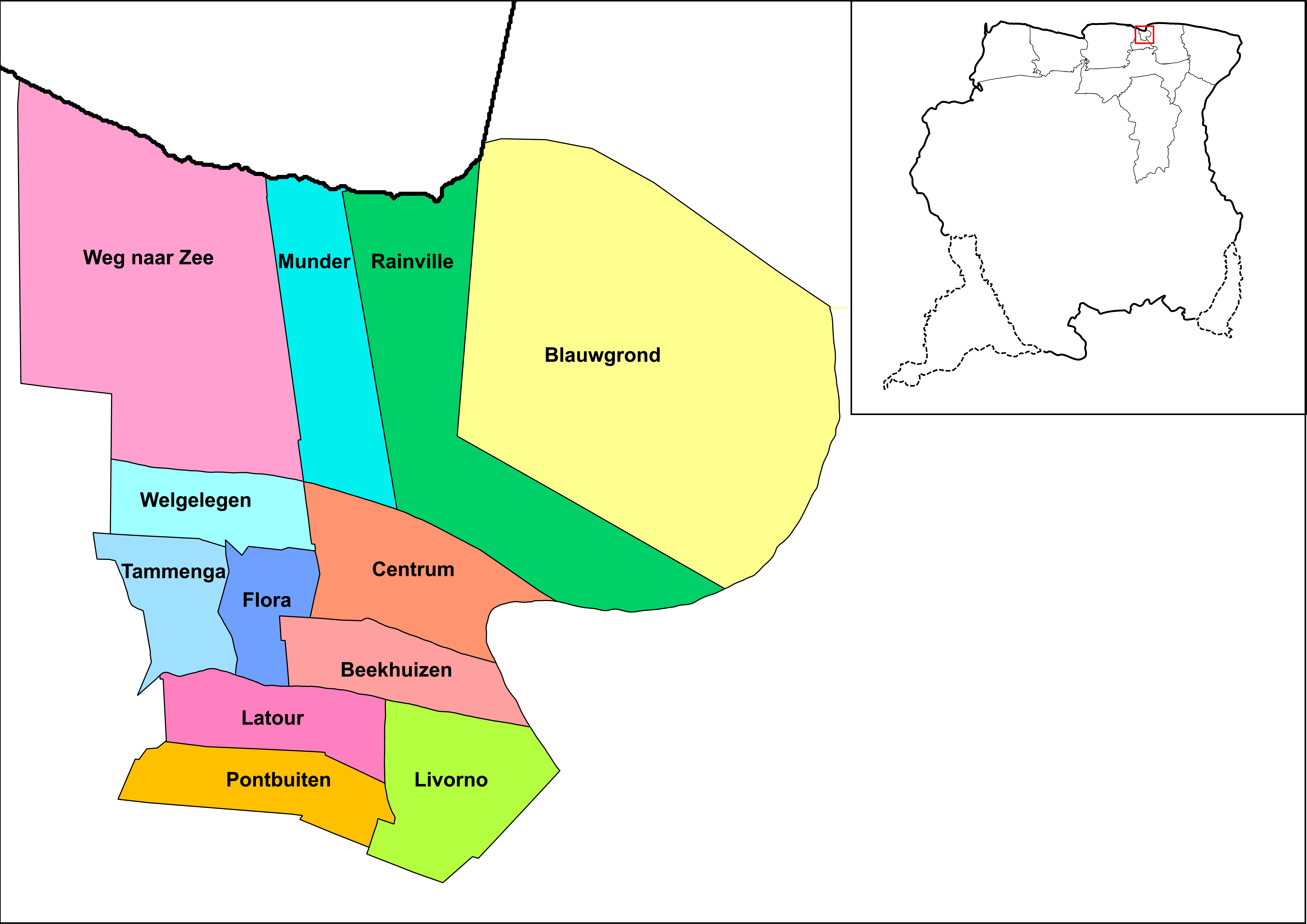
- Map showing the resorts of Paramaribo District. Centrum
- Coordinates: 5.82499°N 55.15963°W
- Country: Suriname
- District: Paramaribo District

Area
  - Total: 9 km^{2} (3.5 sq mi)
- Elevation: 1 m (3.3 ft)

Population (2012)
  - Total: 20,631
  - Density: 2,300/km^{2} (5,900/sq mi)
- Time zone: UTC-3 (AST)

Centrum is a resort in Suriname, located in the Paramaribo District. Its population at the 2012 census was 20,631. The historical centre of Paramaribo is located within the resort. The city centre is mainly in original condition, contains 291 listed monuments, and was designated in 2002 as a UNESCO World Heritage Site.

== History ==
Paramaribo was founded in 1613 by Stoffel Albertszoon near the indigenous village Parmurbo. Around 1665, during the British occupation, the village was expanded and quickly outranked the earlier settlement of Torarica.

The historical centre dates from the 17th and 18th century, and is mainly composed of wooden houses in a plain and symmetrical style, and the street are set in a grid structure. The reason for using wood was that the absence of stone in the vicinity, and the clay was not suitable for bricks. Only important administrative buildings were built from stone shipped from the Netherlands.

In January 1821, a fire consumed the area around Oranjeplein (current name: Onafhankelijkheidsplein) and Waterkant, the oldest part of the city. More than 400 buildings were lost, and it is the reason why the oldest part of the city centre has many 19th-century buildings. In 1832, 46 houses burnt down. The slaves Kodjo, Mentor, and Present were found guilty of arson, and burnt alive.

Even though the centre has been constructed using a wide grid, the houses are spaced relatively close together. The reason is that the slaves, and freed slaves lived in little shacks behind the main façade.

== Frimangron ==
A muddy area to the south of the centre would later be named Frimangron, meaning land of the free men. It was often not found on official maps, but was inhabited by freed former slaves. In 1772 the neighborhood was finally officially listed as neighbourhood F.

== Sights ==
The main sights in the centre are:

- Fort Zeelandia, a fortress built in 1640.
- Saint Peter and Paul Cathedral, a wooden Roman Catholic cathedral, and the world's tallest wooden cathedral.
- Onafhankelijkheidsplein, the Independence Square, which contains the National Assembly and the Presidential Palace among others.
- The Waterkant, the oldest street of Paramaribo with outstanding architecture near the Suriname River.
- Garden of Palms, a palm tree landscape garden in behind the Presidential Palace.
- Keizerstraat, a street where the Neveh Shalom Synagogue and the Ahmadiyya Anjuman Isha’at Islam Mosque are adjacent to one-another.
- Arya Diwaker, one of the biggest mandirs (Hindu temples) of Suriname.
- Centrumkerk, the main church of the Dutch Reformed Church of Suriname.
- Court Charity, a building of the Foresters Friendly Society.
- Elisabeth Samson House, the house of Elisabeth Samson.

== Gallery ==
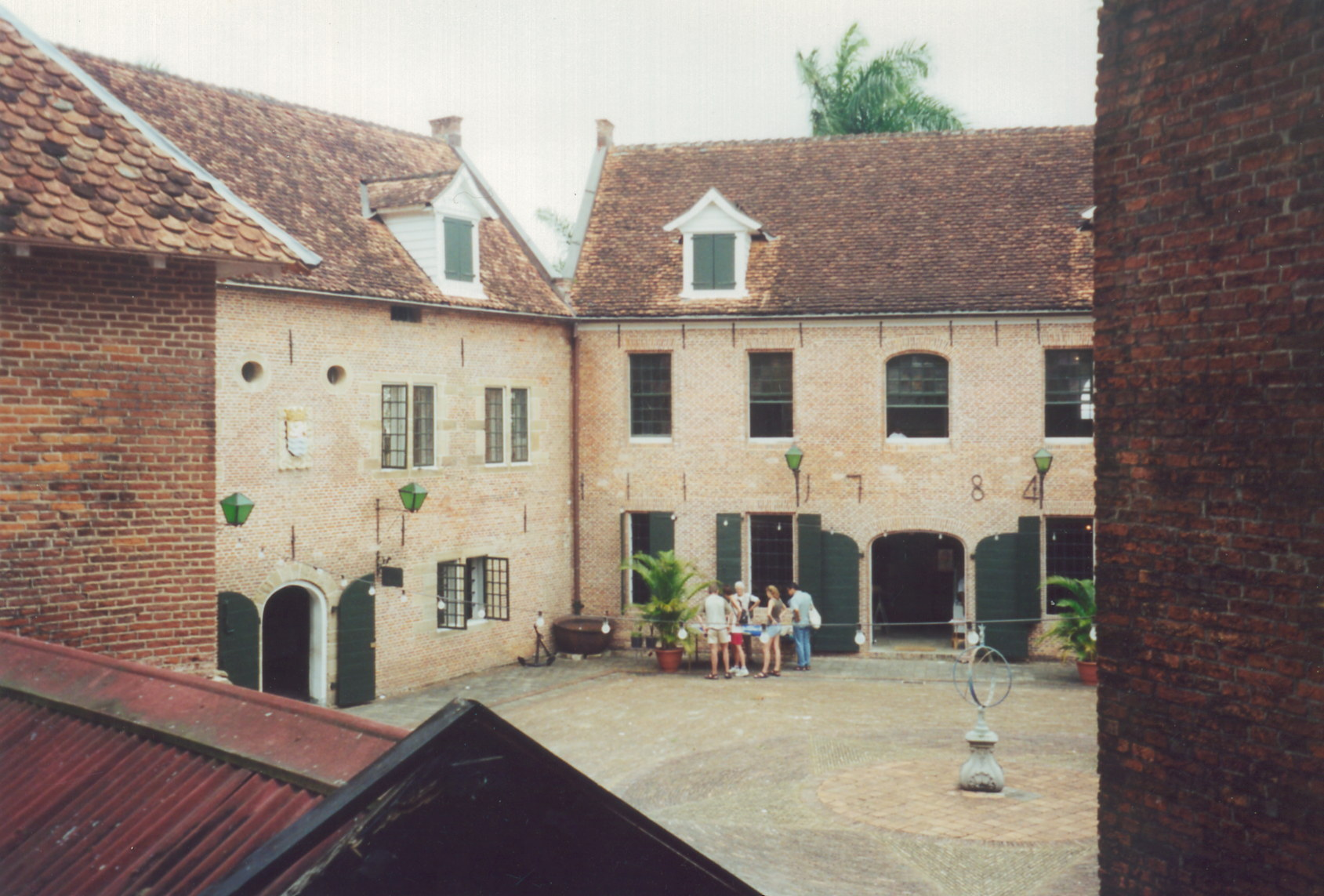
Fort Zeelandia

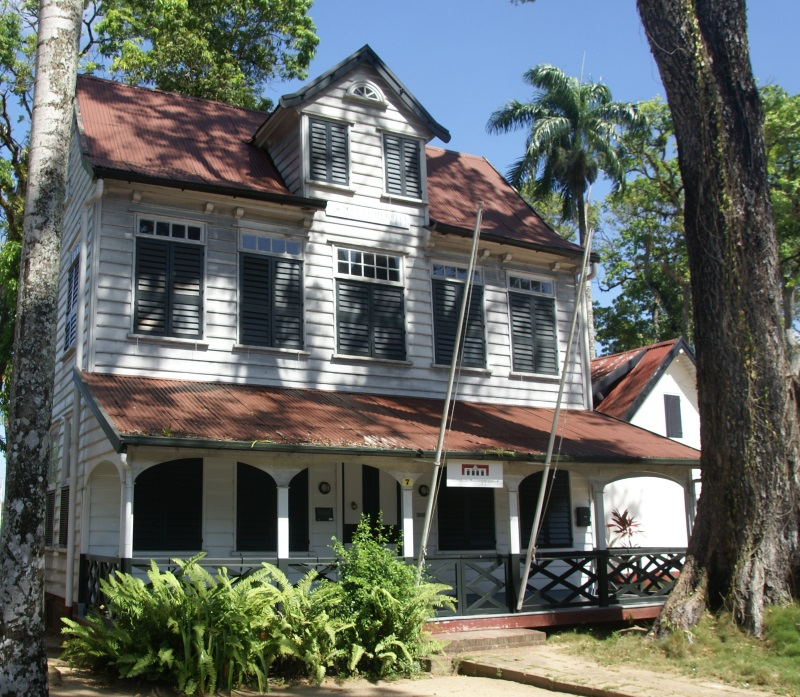
Officer's House on the Zeelandiaweg

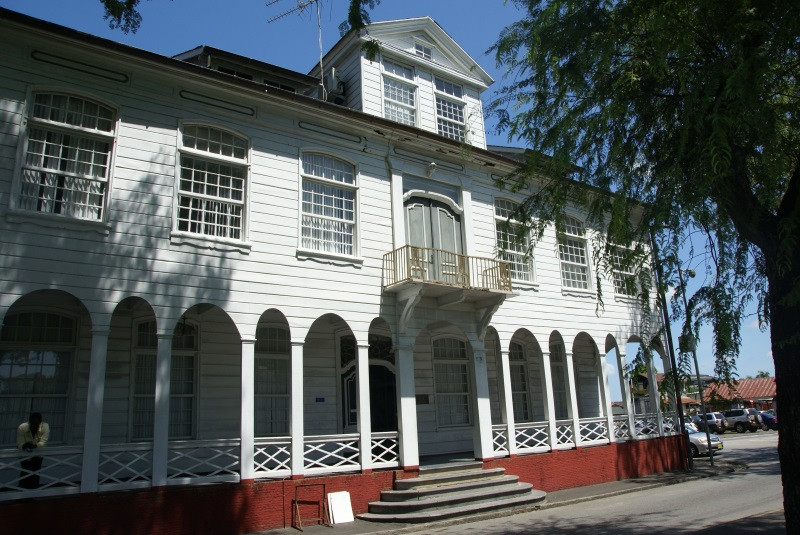
Independence Square (House Du Plessis)

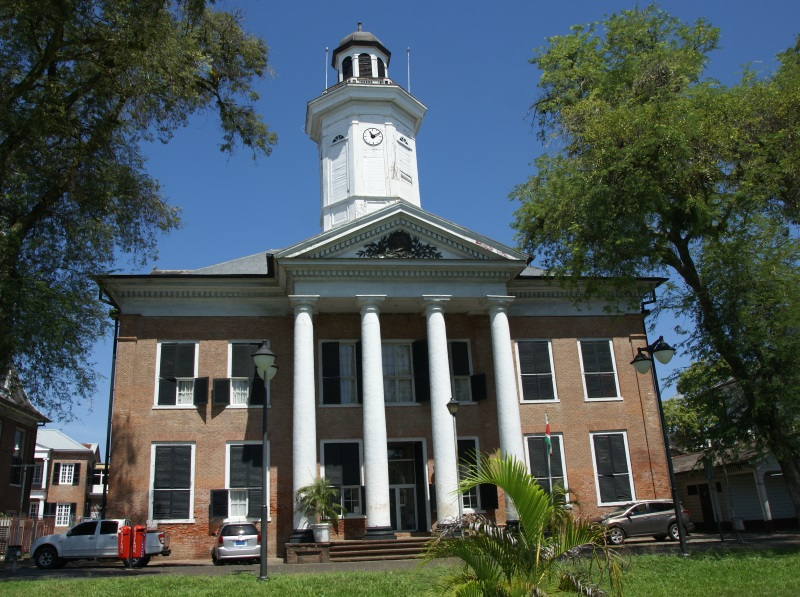
Independence Square (Ministry of Finance)

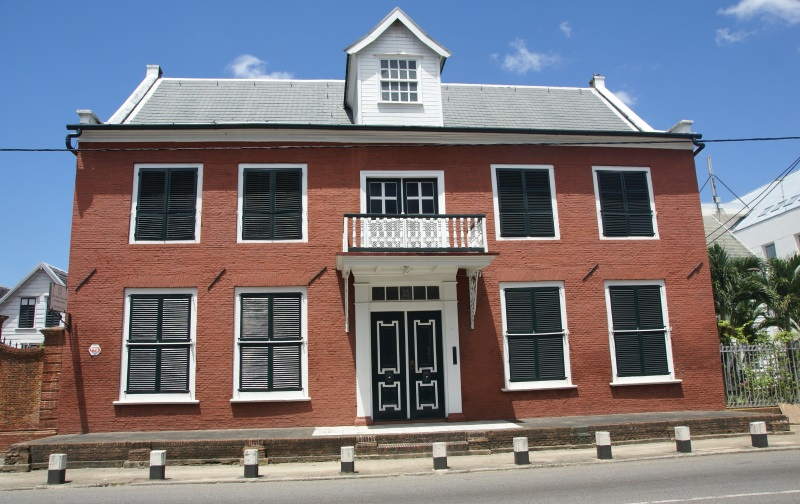
Henck Arronstraat: Bishop's House

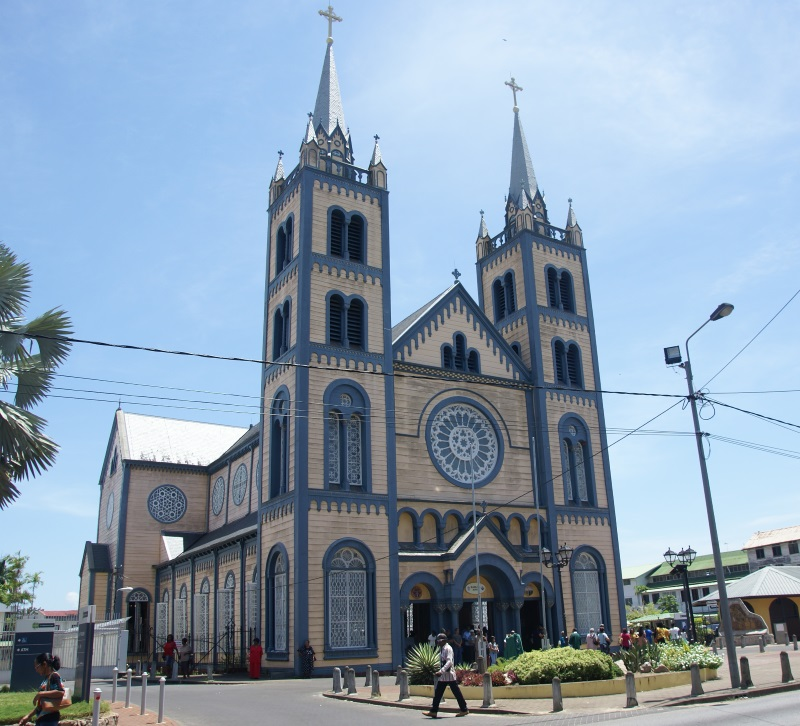
Saint Peter and Paul Cathedral

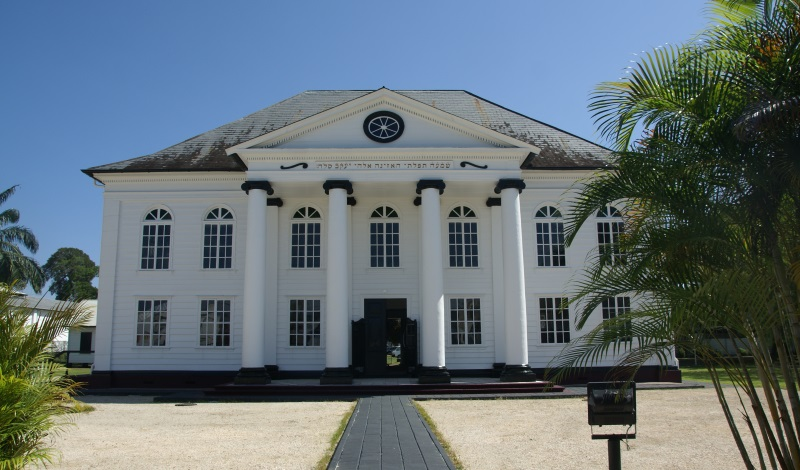
Synagoge Neve Shalom

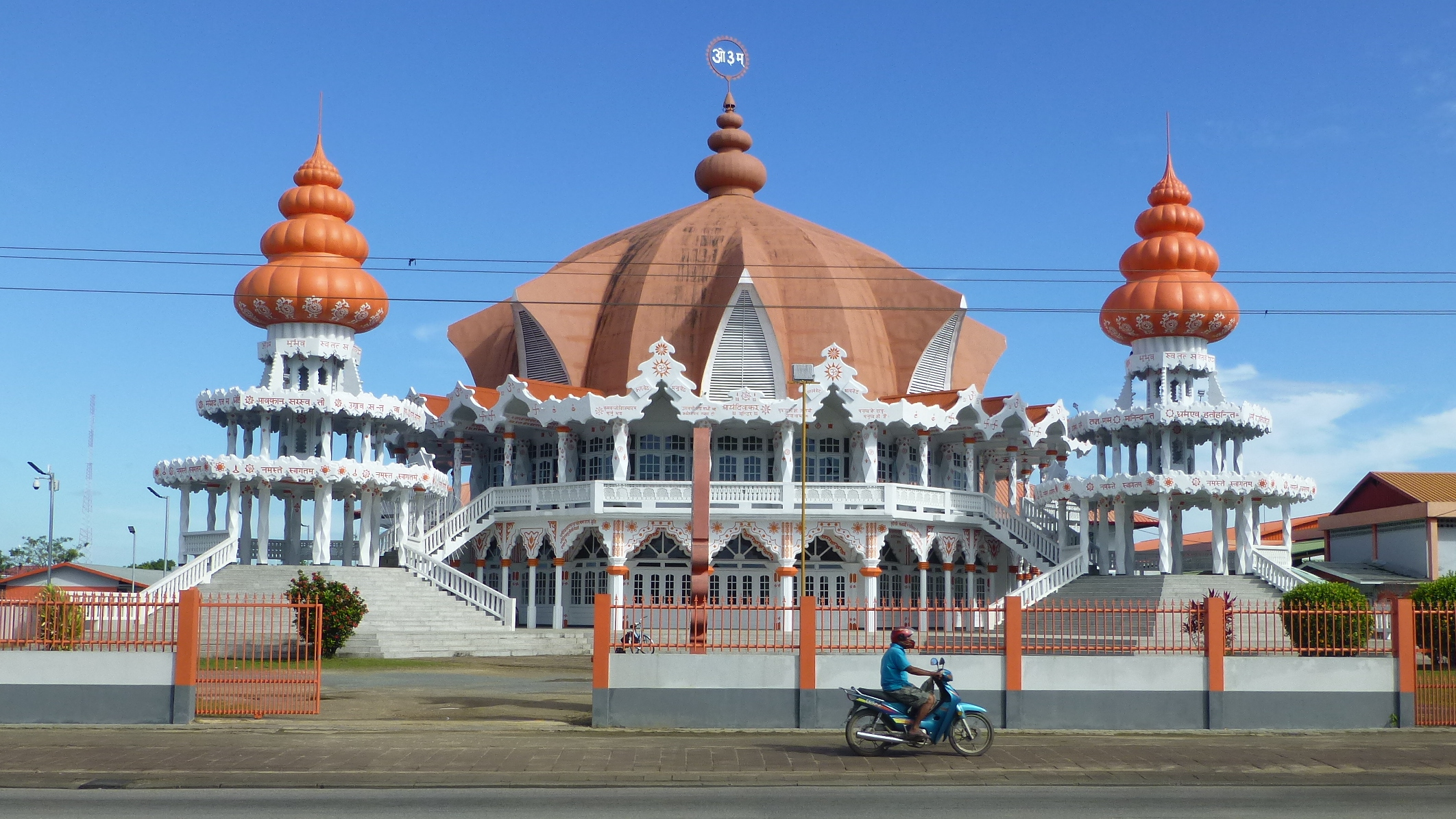
Arya Diwaker temple

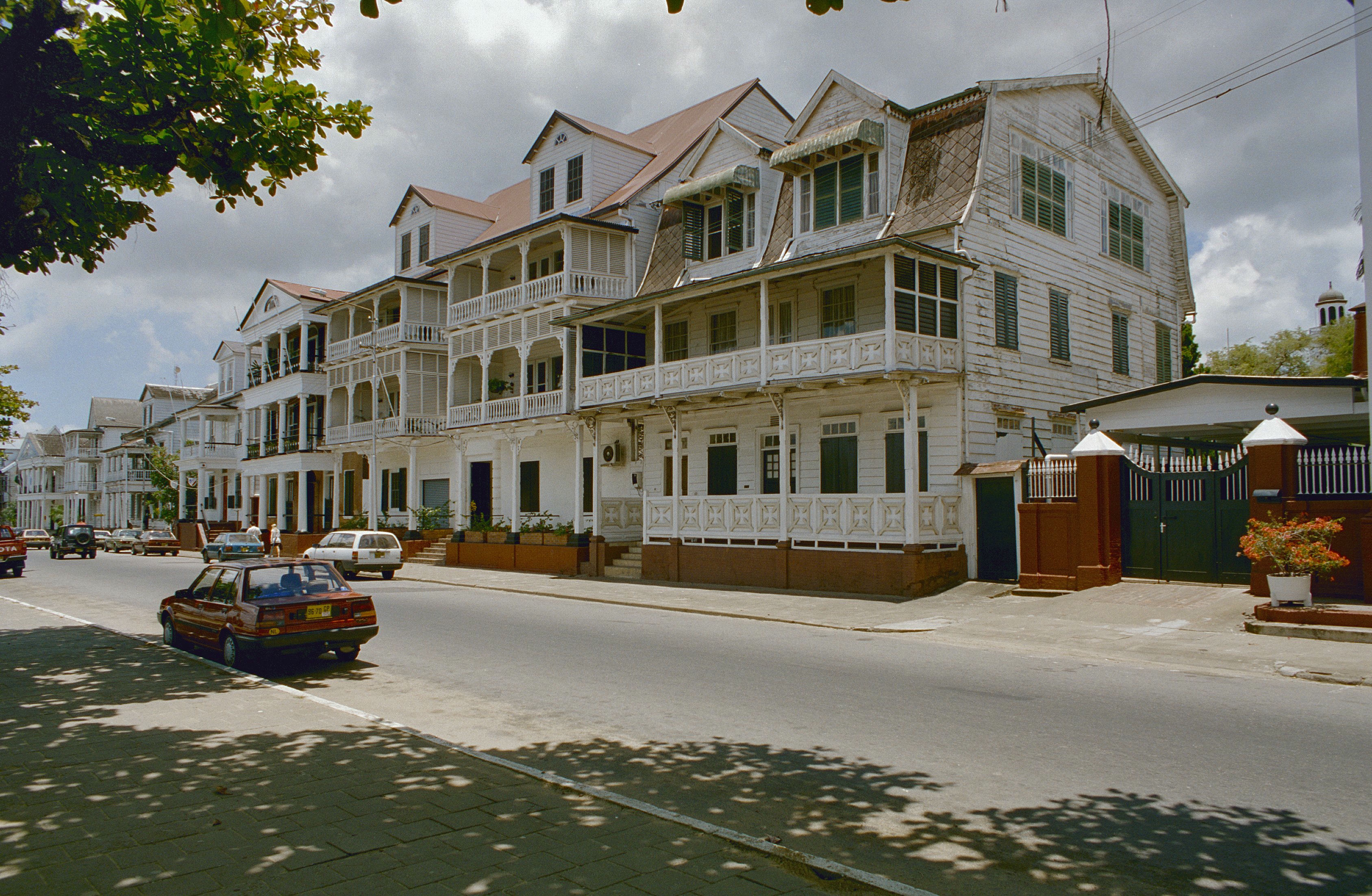
Waterkant

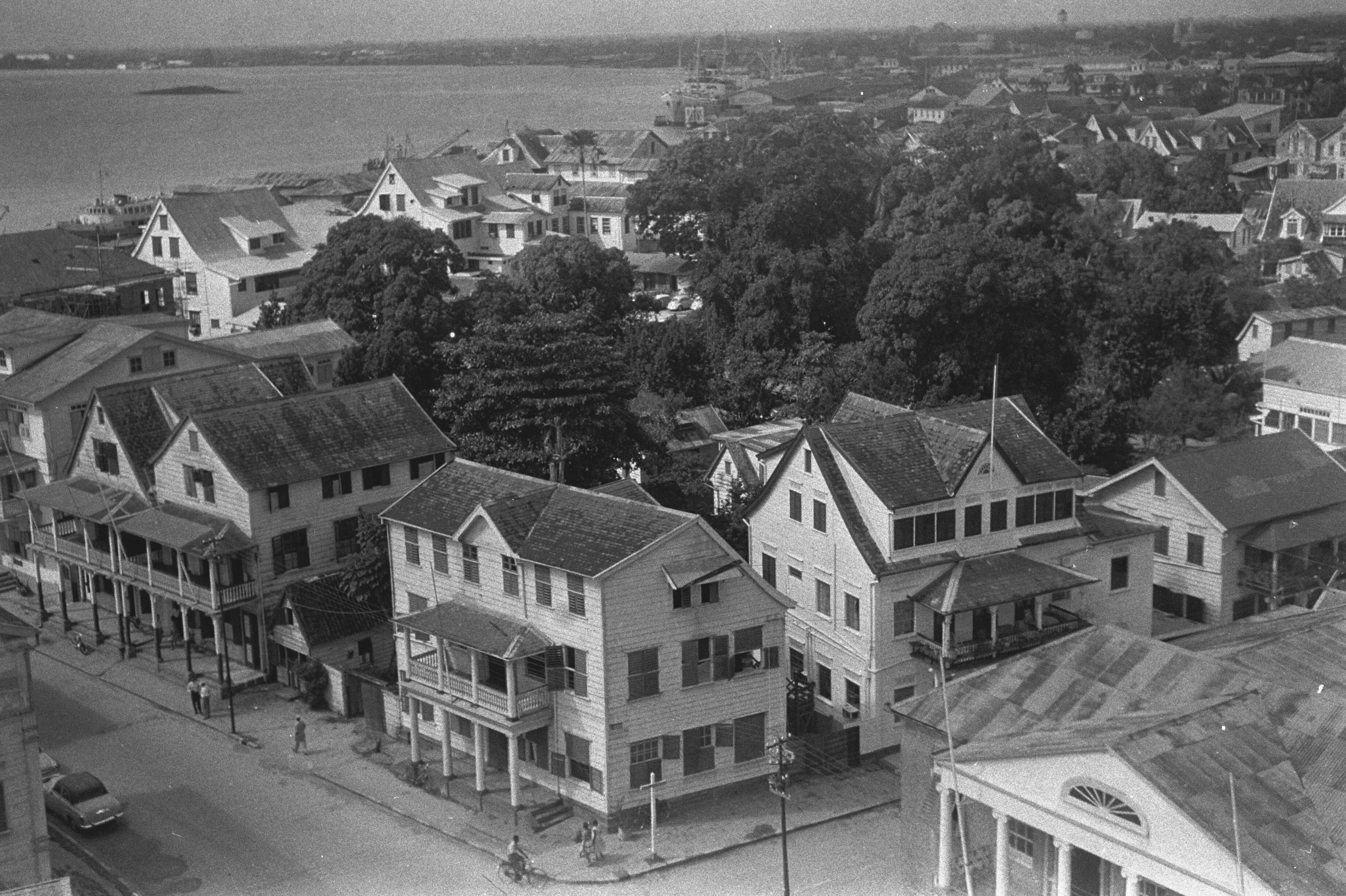
de Mirandastraat (1968)

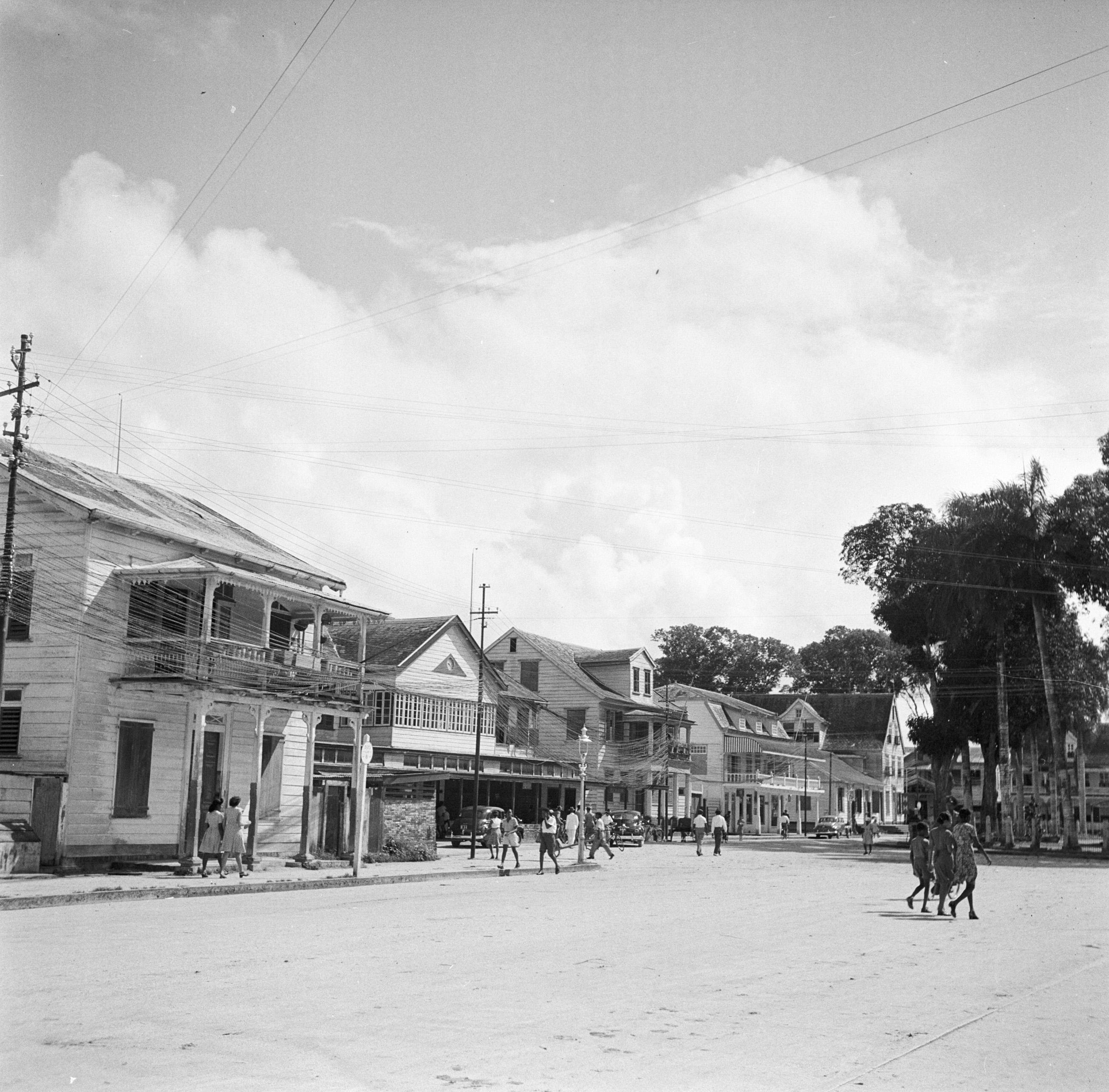
Post Office (1946)

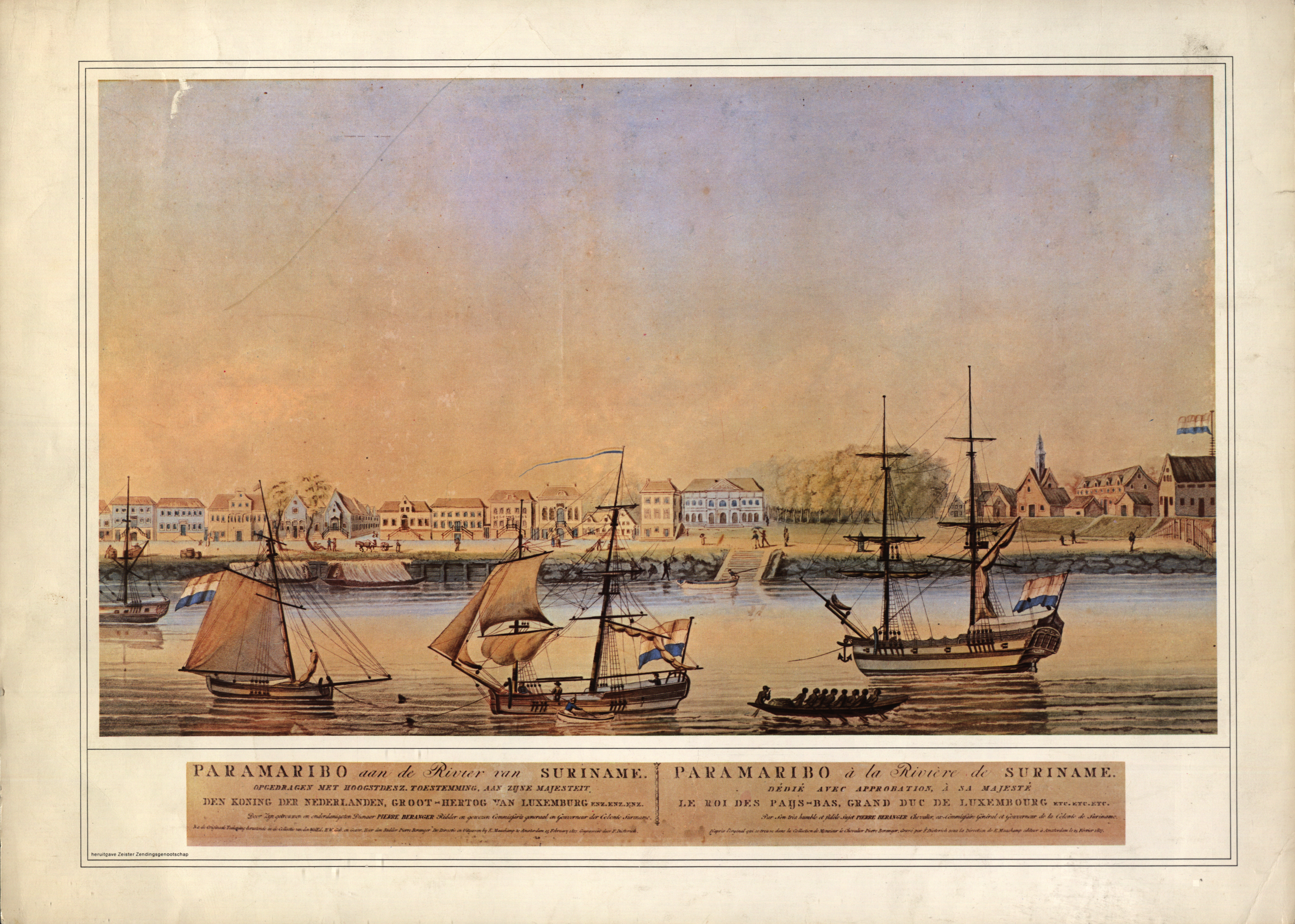
Paramaribo from the Suriname River (1817)
