= Palm Garden =

Palm Garden or Palm Gardens may refer to:

- Palm Garden station, a light rail station in Pittsburgh, Pennsylvania, United States
- Palm Gardens, Nevada, United States, an unincorporated community
- Palm Garden, a restaurant at Lakefront Brewery in Milwaukee, Wisconsin, United States

== See also ==
- Garden of Palms, a palm tree landscape garden in Paramaribo, Suriname
