= Cynthia McLeod =

Surinamese novelist (born 1936)

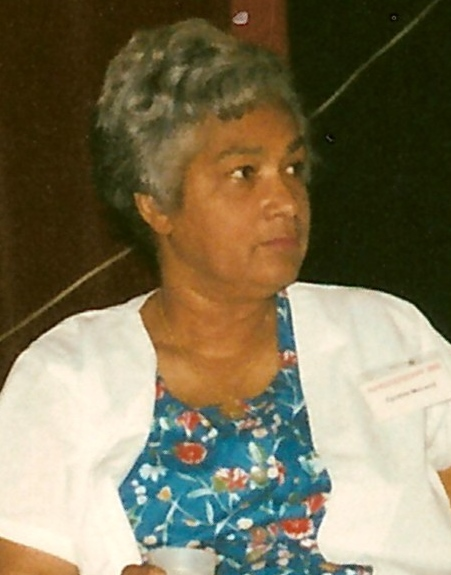
- Cynthia McLeod in 1997
- Born: Cynthia Henri Ferrier; 4 October 1936 (age 89); Paramaribo, Suriname
- Occupation: Author
- Known for: Hoe duur was de suiker (1987), Elisabeth Samson (1993)

Cynthia Henri McLeod (née Ferrier; born 4 October 1936) is a Surinamese novelist known for her historic novels and whose debut novel instantly made her one of the most prominent authors of Suriname.

== Background ==
McLeod was born in Paramaribo as Cynthia Ferrier; she is the daughter of Johan Ferrier, the first President of Suriname. She is the half-sister of Dutch politician Kathleen Ferrier.

McLeod completed her secondary school education in Suriname and continued her education in the Netherlands, where she studied to become a teacher in Child Care and Education. She married Dr. Donald McLeod whom she met in the Netherlands. As a teacher, she participated in a project for education renewal, and wrote a number of stories for children which were published in the series Van Hier en daar en Overal. In 1962 they went to Suriname, where McLeod studied for a teaching degree in Dutch language and Dutch literature. From 1969 to 1978 she taught Dutch language and literature in pre-university education in Paramaribo. Her husband, Donald McLeod, was appointed in 1978 as Suriname's Ambassador to Venezuela. He later became Suriname's ambassador to Belgium and the United States. Abroad, McLeod started writing; during her stay in Belgium she had the opportunity to do research in the archives of The Hague, Amsterdam, Rotterdam, Emmerich, and Köln.

In 1986 the McLeods returned to Suriname and in 1987 her debut novel Hoe duur was de suiker? (The Cost of Sugar) was published by publisher Vaco in Paramaribo. The first print was sold out within a few weeks and Cynthia McLeod became the most famous Surinamese novelist overnight. Later this historical novel about the sugar cane industry in the 18th century was published under license by her Dutch publisher Conserve. The novel was later turned into a movie with the same name, and broadcast as a mini series by VARA Television. Soon other historical novels from her hand appeared, such as Herinneringen aan Mariënburg.

McLeod also wrote books for children. The most important are Lafu (1992) and Toen het vakantie was (1999).

== Elisabeth Samson ==
McLeod studied the life of Elisabeth Samson for over eleven years. Samson was a free black woman whose name occurs prominently in historical works on Suriname because she wanted to marry a white man (which was forbidden in the colony Suriname during the first half of the 18th century). The results of this research were first published as a study by the Faculty of Cultural Anthropology of the University of Utrecht. For eight years subsequently McLeod studied the social structure and life of that period, which allowed her to position Elisabeth as a rich free black person in this society dominated by prejudices and white supremacy. She then wrote the novel The Free Negress Elisabeth.

McLeod considered the dilapidated state of the Elisabeth Samson House shameful, and established the Elisabeth Samson Foundation in order to restore the building to its original condition. The building was bought by the Elisabeth Samson Foundation on 19 January 2021. It will be restored to its original form. After the restoration, the building will be turned into the Elisabeth Samson Museum.

== Other activities ==
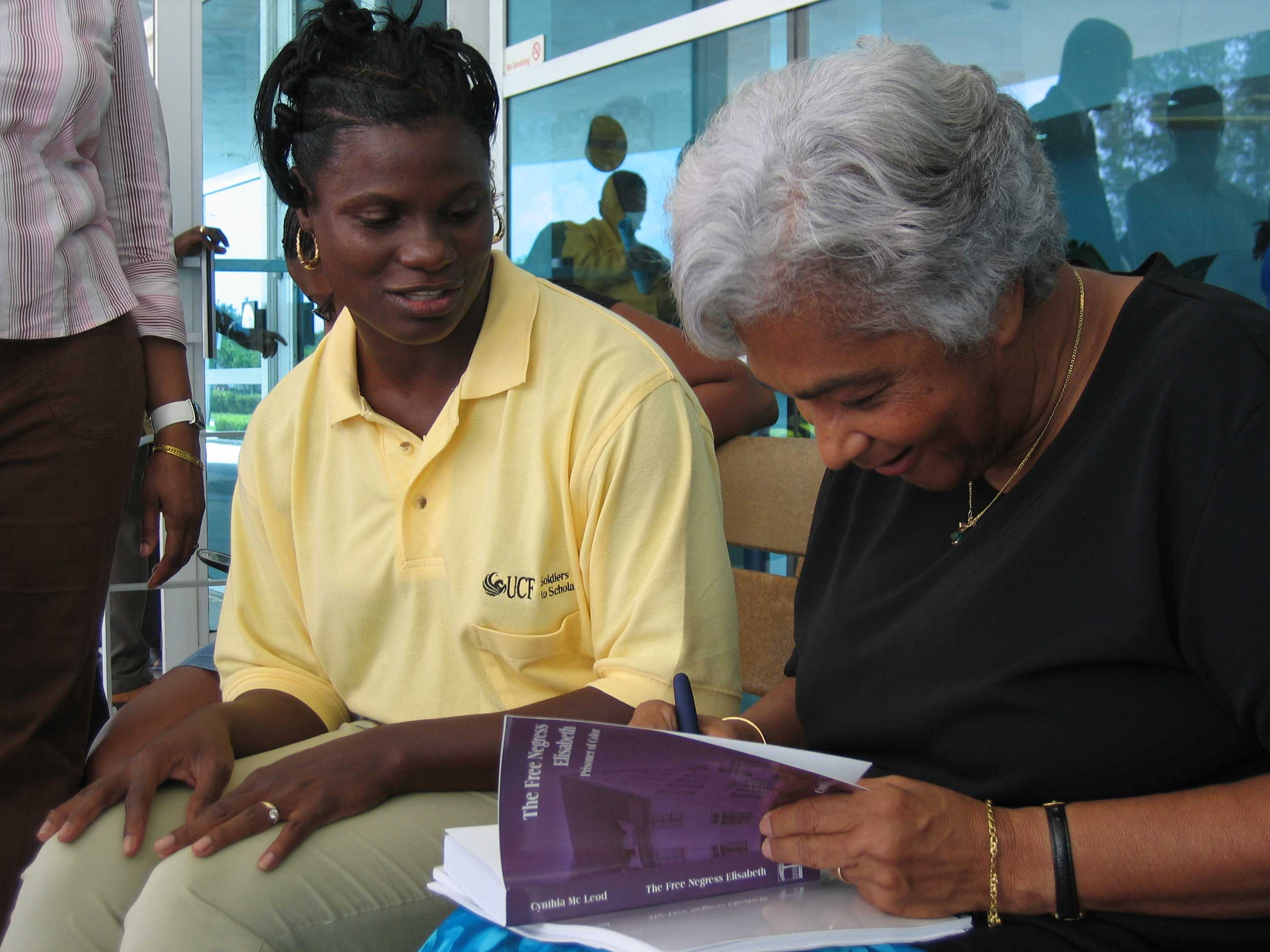
Cynthia McLeod (right) signing a copy of her novel in Miami, Florida, USA in 2005

As a result of her research McLeod has gained a wealth of knowledge about Surinamese history, knowledge she gladly shares with others. She organizes free educational trips for Surinamese school youth with her motorized vessel, the Sweet Merodia. During these tours on Surinamese rivers, past former plantations, she captivates her audiences with stories about its interesting past. She further engages in historic city tours through the centre of historic Paramaribo, which has been a UNESCO World Heritage Site since 2002.

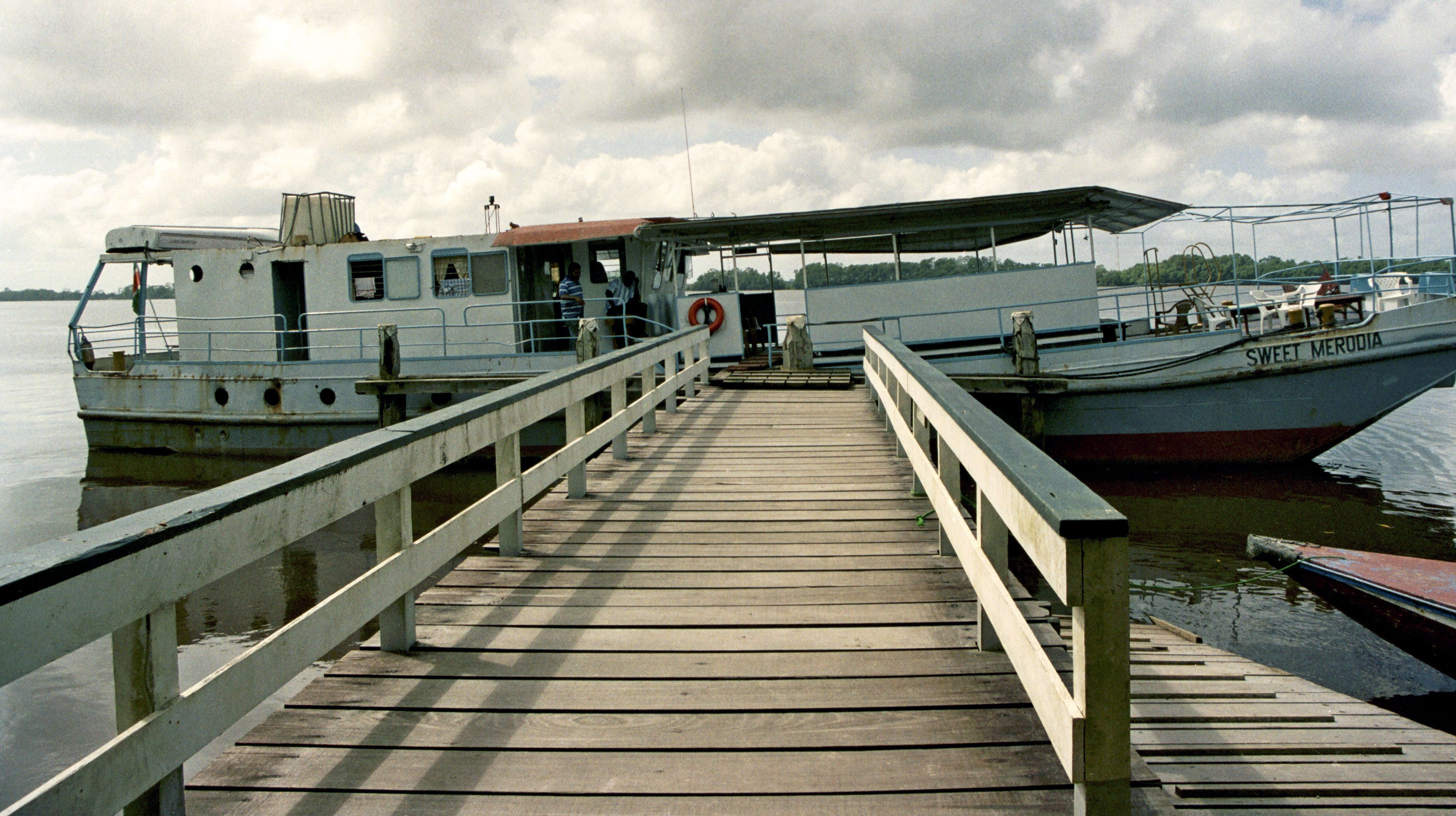
Cynthia McLeod's vessel, the Sweet Merodia.

== Bibliography ==
Historical novels
Hoe duur was de suiker	1987	ISBN 90-5429-056-0
Vaarwel Merodia	1993	ISBN 99914-0-047-8
Ma Rochelle Passée Welkom El Dorado	1996	ISBN 90-5429-053-6
Tweemaal Mariënburg	1997	ISBN 90-5429-087-0
Herinneringen aan Mariënburg	1998	ISBN 99914-0-055-9
De vrije negerin Elisabeth	2000	ISBN 90-5429-078-1
The Free Negress Elisabeth	2005	ISBN 99914-71-20-0
... die revolutie niet begrepen!...	2005	ISBN 90-5429-201-6
Tutuba. Het meisje van het slavenschip Leusden	2013	ISBN 978 90-5429-357-6
Zenobia – Slavin op het paleis	2015	ISBN 90-5429-399-3
Studies
Elisabeth Samson; een vrije zwarte vrouw in het achttiende-eeuwse Suriname	1993/1996	ISBN 90-5429-054-4
Slavernij en de Memorie	2002	ISBN 90-5429-159-1
Kriskras door Frimangron	2003	ISBN 90-6832-537-X
Paramaribo. Stad van harmonische tegenstellingen	2007	ISBN 978-90-5429-237-1
Children's books and musicals
Lafu	1992	
Toen het vakantie was	1999	ISBN 99914-87-02-6
De kinderen van de Burenstraat	1997	
Het Grote Regenwoud	2003	

== See also ==
- Caribbean literature
- Postcolonial literature
