= Suzanne Amomba Paillé =

French Guianan planter and philanthropist

- Born: 1673; Gulf of Guinea
- Died: 1755 (aged 81–82); Cayenne, French Guiana
- Other names: Suzanne Paillet, Amomba, Suzanne Amomba, Madame Payé
- Occupation: planter
- Years active: 1704–1755
- Known for: philanthropy

Suzanne Amomba Paillé (c. 1673-1683 – 27 January 1755) was an African-Guianan slave, slave owner, planter and philanthropist.

A freed African slave, she amassed a large estate in French Guiana with her husband. After inheriting the estate upon his death, the colonial administration barred further interracial marriages to keep her estate from benefiting a second husband should she remarry. They also appointed a guardian to manage her assets believing a former slave could not control her own affairs. After suing the government and having the guardianship removed, she donated her estate to charity to educate the children of the country.

== Early life ==
Little is known of Amomba's early history. Census records in the archives of Guyana indicate that she was born between 1673 and 1683. Her original African name suggests origins around the Gulf of Guinea, and her baptismal name was Suzanne. She was brought to the French colony of Guiana as a slave to Lieutenant François de la Mothe Aigron, who later manumitted her. On 29 June 1704, she married under the terms of the Code Noir, the soldier Jean Paillé, a Frenchman from Pont-Saint-Martin in Basse Marche. He was stationed at the Cayenne garrison and was also a master mason, employed as the stonemason of the Cathédrale of Saint-Sauveur de Cayenne. During her lifetime, she was known as "Suzanne Amomba, free negress" or "Suzanne Amomba, wife of Jean Paillé".

== Career ==
After her husband was discharged, the couple obtained a plot of land in Macouria in 1709. Their assets at that time were a rifle, six slaves, a milk cow, and plantings of manioc and yams. By 1737, they had increased their holdings considerably owning one sword, two rifles, sixty-seven slaves, forty-six cows, food crops and export crops—annatto, cacao, coffee and indigo. They also owned a town home on Rue des Casernes in Cayenne, near the old port and Caserne Loubère (Loubère Barracks), making them some of the most wealthy planters in the colony.

When her husband died in 1739, as they had no children, Suzanne Amomba inherited the entire estate. As a wealthy widow, illiterate, and elderly, she became a target of many suitors who offered proposals of marriage. In an effort to protect her and potential future gain by the state, colonial administrators issued an order in 1741 barring interracial marriages in the colony. The authorities also appointed a guardian to control her affairs, claiming she was senile and questioning whether as a former slave she should be allowed to make decisions about her use of her own assets.

In 1742, Suzanne Amomba sued for the right to control her own business and drafted a will demonstrating that she understood the principles of devising her bequests. For two years, she awaited a decision and was finally granted the rights of controlling her own property in 1744. On 30 April 1748, Paillé donated her plantation and assets, including fifty-five slaves, to a charity dedicated to providing education to children of either sex. She reserved the use of her property for her lifetime.

== Death and legacy ==
Paillé died on 27 January 1755 in Cayenne and was buried the following day in the Cathédrale of Saint-Sauveur de Cayenne. Upon her death, her assets were combined with those of François de la Mothe Aigron, her former master, to support a school in Cayenne. Some historians believe her donation was coerced, while others have seen the donation as Suzanne Amomba's assertion of her own will, taking action before the authorities could thwart her wishes. In 1898, the city of Cayenne asked the Colonial Minister to rename a street in her honor. The street, Rue de Madame Payé was designated and marked the first time Suzanne Amomba was directly associated with her husband's surname.

== See also ==
- Ana Gallum
- Anna Kingsley
- Elisabeth Samson
