= Elisabeth Samson House =

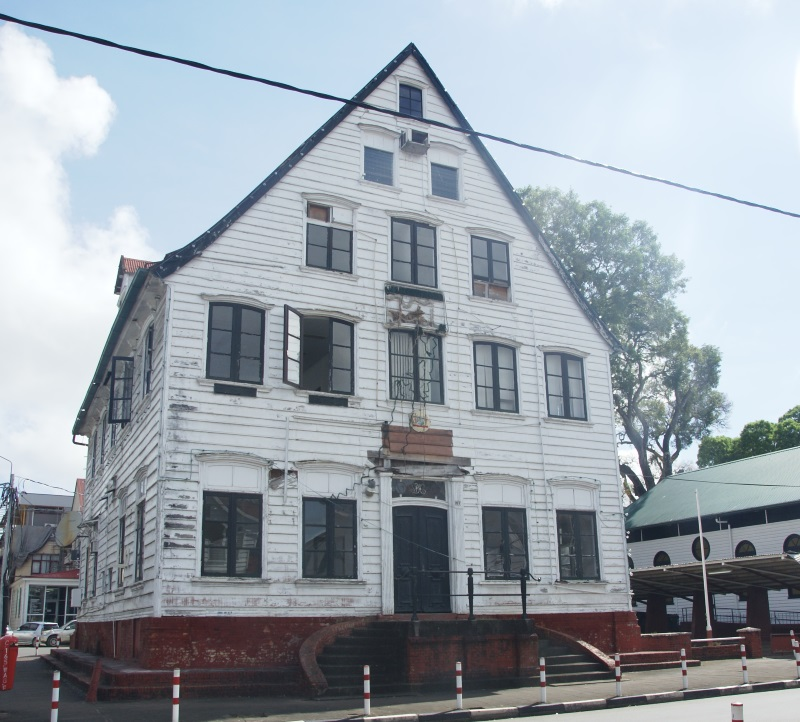
- Elisabeth Samson House (2016)

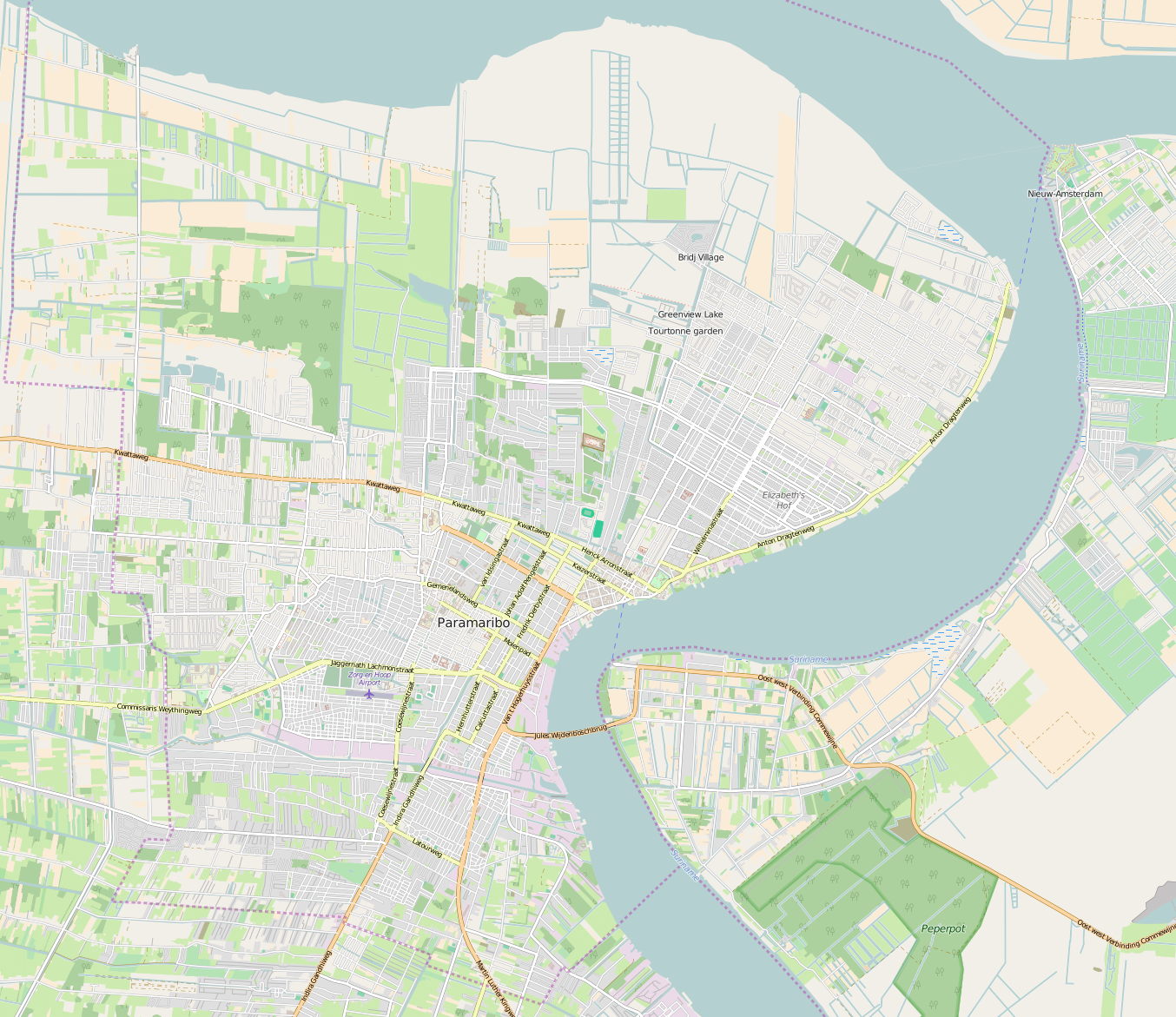
- Location within Paramaribo

General information
- Location: Paramaribo, Suriname
- Coordinates: 5.82900°N 55.15786°W
- Completed: ca. 1742
- Client: Elisabeth Samson Museum

The Elisabeth Samson House is a residential building which used to be owned by Elisabeth Samson, the first Afro-Surinamese millionaire. It is located on Wagenwegstraat in the centre of Paramaribo, Suriname, and is a monument. After Samson's death, it was bought by the State, and in the early 21st century, it was in a neglected state. Cynthia McLeod wanted the building restored. On 19 January 2021, the building was bought by the Elisabeth Samson Foundation, and will be turned into a museum.

== History ==
Elisabeth Samson (1715–1771) was born as a child of two freed slaves. She owned two coffee plantations, and started an affair with Carl Otto Creutz, a German coffee plantation owner. Around 1742, Samson and Creutz built a house on Wagenwegstraat. They owned 40 house slaves. Slaves were usually living in dwellings in the yard of house. Samson's slaves were housed in buildings next door and across the street. The Elisabeth Samson House was lavishly furnished. At Samson's death in 1771, the inventory of the house was 31 folios long, and her estate was valued at 1,138,000 guilders (In 2016: €9,415,447).

Herman Zobre, her Caucasian husband, squandered the money, and the building became property of the government. Up to 2012, the Ministry of Labour was headquartered in the Elisabeth Samson House. Cynthia McLeod, a prominent Surinamese author, considered the dilapidated state of the building shameful, and established the Elisabeth Samson Foundation in order to restore the building to its original condition.

In 2017, the Government of Suriname decided not to restore the building, and sell it to the highest bidder. The building is located 150 metres outside the perimeter of the Unesco World Heritage Site. Thanks to a donation of the Nationale Postcode Loterij, the building was bought by the Elisabeth Samson Foundation on 19 January 2021. It will be restored to its original shape. After the restoration, the building will be used to house the Elisabeth Samson Museum.

== Building ==
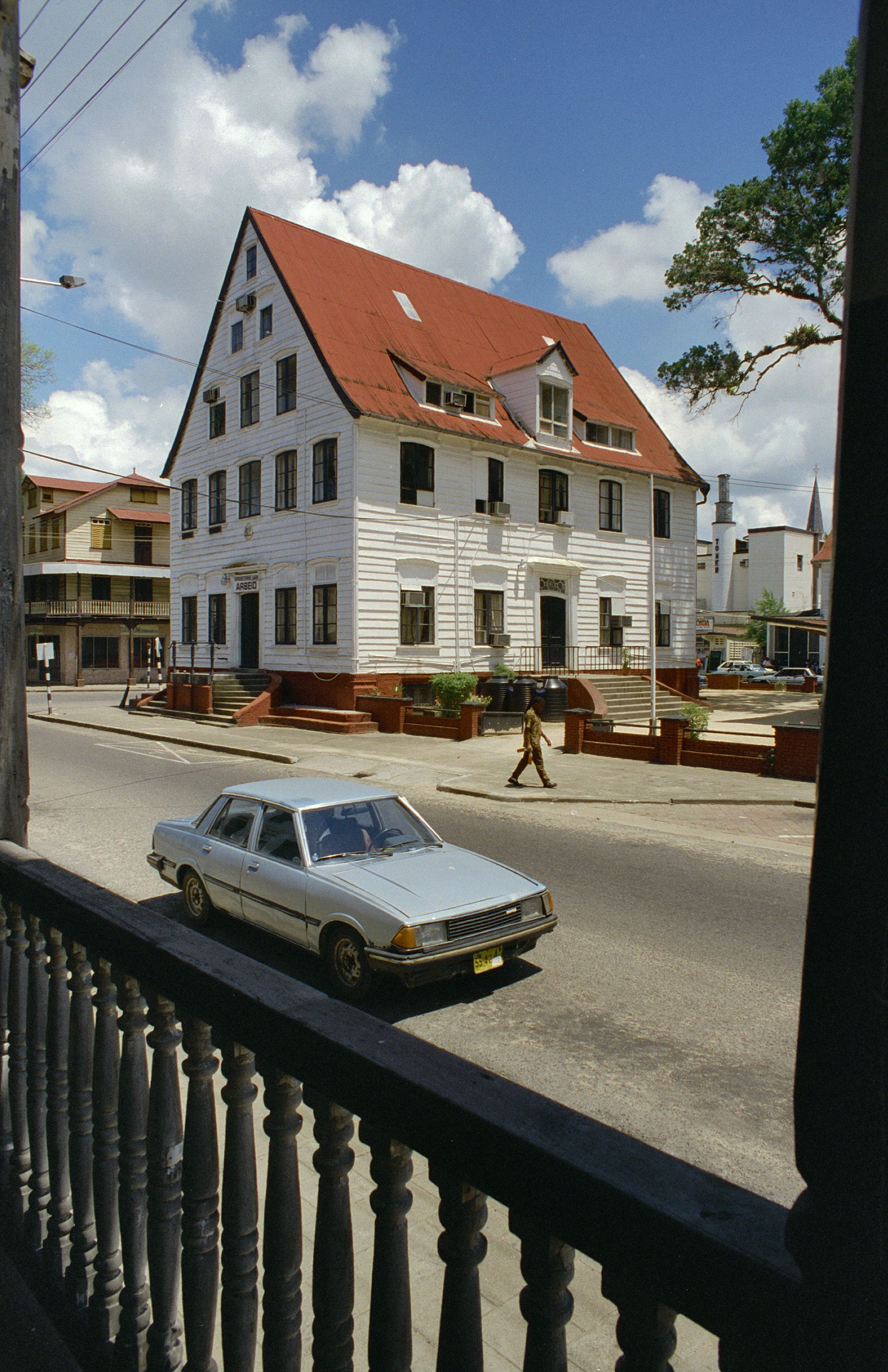

The building is located at the corner of Wagenwegstraat with Malebatrumstraat. The property extends all the way to Herenstraat. The building has a brick cellar which at the time Samson lived there, contained a large wine cellar. The house measures five stories, three of which are in the attic. There are dormers on the side of the house. The building has two entrances. The main entrance has two quarter round stairs, and there is an additional entrance on the eastern side.

== Bibliography ==
- McLeod, Cynthia (1998). "Celebrating the Extraordinary Life of Elisabeth Samson" (PDF). IDB Cultural Centre.
