= Kojo =

Kojo or KOJO may refer to:

== Arts and entertainment ==
- King Kojo, a novel by Ruth Plumly Thompson
- Kōjō (Eng: The Factory), a 2013 novella by Japanese author Hiroko Oyamada
- Kojo (company), Australian entertainment and film production company
- KOJO (FM), a radio station (91.1 FM) licensed to Lake Charles, Louisiana, United States

== People ==
- Kojo, one of several Akan names used by the Akan people of West Africa
- Kojo (maroon) (c. 1680–1744), a Jamaican maroon also known as Cudjoe
- Kojo Annan (born 1973), the son of ex-UN Secretary-General Kofi Annan
- Kojo Akoto Boateng (born 1986), Ghanaian media personality
- Kojo Bonsu, Ghanaian businessman
- Kojo Choi, Ghanaian ambassador to South Korea
- Kojo Funds, stage name of English rapper Errol Bellot
- Kojo Laing (1946–2017), Ghanaian novelist and poet
- Kojo Mensah (born 1985), Ghanaian basketball player
- Kojo Nnamdi (born 1945), American radio show host
- Kojo Nana Obiri-Yeboah, a Pentecostal pastor from Ghana mostly active in Uganda
- Nikola Kojo (born 1967), Serbian actor
- Kojo (singer) (born 1953), singer who represented Finland in the 1982 Eurovision Song Contest

== Places ==
- Kojo (Iraq), Yazidi village near Sinjar in northern Iraq
- Kojo, North Korea, location of a highway airstrip in North Korea
- Kojo, the main village of Koijärvi, Finland

== Other uses ==
- Kojo (programming language)

== See also ==
- Adjei Kojo, a small town in Ghana
- Kodjo, a name
- Boris Kodjoe (born 1973), Austrian-American actor
