= Ana Gallum =

American businesswoman

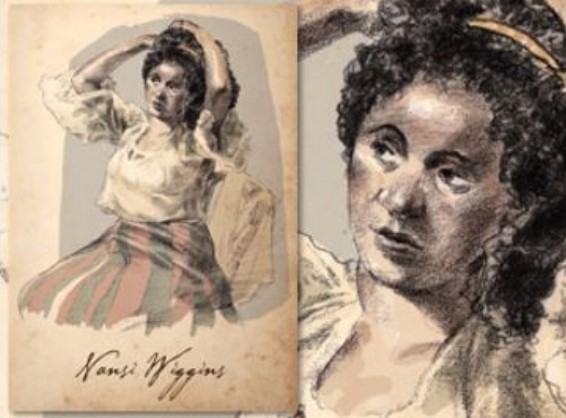
- Born: 1755; Senegal
- Died: 1840 (aged 84–85)

Ana Gallum (circa 1755 – 1840), also referred to as Nansi Wiggins, was a Senegalese woman who was enslaved in Florida, eventually becoming an enslaving planter herself.

She was kidnapped from her homeland and brought to the Americas as a bondsperson. The beginning of her story is similar to millions of other Africans who fell victim to the Atlantic slave trade and were subjected to the Middle Passage. Gallum's life, however, was different from most of them. She was freed after serving as a bondswoman for a short period, marrying her former enslaver ― an English-born planter ― and had six children with him. As a widow, Gallum would ultimately inherit and enslave numerous people herself, as well as own and operate a plantation in what was then Spanish Florida. Dr. Jane Landers, a historian and the leading researcher on Gallum, summarizes the life of Gallum: "Ana suffered rape and hardships on the Florida frontier, but was able to utilize legal and social resources in the Spanish world that enabled her to establish security".

== Early life ==
There is little known about Ana Gallum's early life due to a severe lack of documentation. What is known is that she was born in approximately 1755 in Senegal, Africa, where she was kidnapped at a young age and sold to the Scottish trading firm, Panton, Leslie & Company. Once aboard a slave ship, she survived the perilous Middle Passage journey and was brought into St. Augustine, Florida. Once she arrived, she was sold to an English-born planter, Joseph "Job" Wiggins. After some time together, the two married in a Protestant ceremony in 1781. However, because the two chose to marry outside of the Catholic Church, Spanish officials did not recognize the marriage as the Catholic church did not sanctify it. Regardless, they carried on with their lives, and Gallum eventually used her marriage as a stepping stone to rise from being an average plantation worker to becoming a plantation mistress.

The pair had six children together throughout their marriage ― 4 daughters and 2 sons ― all born free under Spanish law. Gallum would eventually baptize all of her children in the Catholic church in 1795 and 1797, which in turn would help the children to advance further in their lives and allow them to make financially advantageous marriages under Spanish rule. The two remained together for another 18 years until Wiggins died in 1797, leaving his entire estate and all property to Gallum as the rightful inheritor on the behalf of their children. She retained ownership of the estate, the rights of her children, a furnished plantation house, and any bondspeople who worked the property. Thereafter, Gallum continued to run her newly acquired estate as her husband had, the only difference being that she was now the head of household, with the assistance of her eldest son Benjamin.

== Marriage and children ==
Ana Gallum was married to Joseph Wiggins in a Protestant ceremony in 1779 in Rolleston, Florida. Now known as Palatka, the city was held by the British from 1763 to 1784, at which time it was ceded to the Spanish as part of the 1783 Treaty of Paris. This rendered the marriage between Wiggins and Gallum moot in the eyes of the Catholic Church. This was because Joseph was a Protestant, and the newly instated Spanish colonial government (which was Catholic) did not formally recognize their marriage.

By the time Wiggins and Gallum married, Gallum was approximately 24 years old and more than able to bear children. However, their first child ― Beatriz, also known as Patricia ― was born almost three years later, in 1782, when Gallum was about 27. The couple had six children in total, beginning with Beatriz/Patricia in 1782, Maria in 1785, Benjamin in 1788, Abigail Juana/Jennie in 1789, Ana Maria on May 15, 1792, and Jorge Jose on July 10, 1795. Joseph Wiggins died only two years after the birth of his last child when Gallum was 42 years old. This led to Gallum inheriting his property, which consisted of an approximately 1,400-acre plantation, 100 head of cattle, farming equipment, and six cabins of enslaved people. Wiggins's death also began what would be a four-year process to prove that Gallum was, in fact, the proper wife and inheritor of his estate.

After the death of her husband, Gallum worked the plantation and actively participated in the trading of both cattle and enslaved people while doing so. Two years after the death of her husband in early 1799, Gallum was sexually assaulted by a man named Pedro Cassaly, who had come to the plantation to purchase cattle. While Cassaly drowned on the road during his return to St. Augustine, the encounter left Gallum pregnant with her seventh and final child at approximately age 44, and she gave birth to Pedro Cassaly II later that same year. She petitioned for financial assistance for this child because of the circumstances of his birth. She was denied by the courts because her inheritance of her husband's estate left her a wealthy woman.

== Court cases ==
Due to Gallum living in Florida during the period of Spanish colonial rule, the conditions of her enslavement were different than those faced by other enslaved Africans living elsewhere in Colonial America. Where an enslaved individual was sold into bondage for generations in the Americas, enslavement was seen as a legal condition. It came with some rights under the Spanish Siete Partidas. Under these guidelines, enslaved people were afforded certain rights, and enslaved women were placed into the same protected class as children and other "invalids" who were believed to require "supervision" but were deemed deserving of some certain amount of privilege. Women were protected from physical and sexual assault under Spanish law, and enslaved women were no exception. Spaniards were typically accustomed to African communities, and miscegenation was common in the Spanish colonies. According to historian Dr. Jane Landers, "the courts in Spanish Florida regularly supported the inheritance rights of women and children of African descent if their relationship to the deceased had been publicly acknowledged, even when the mothers were not legally married to the fathers of their children."

Pedro Cassaly sexually assaulted Gallum while he purchased some cattle from her estate. The sale proceeded, but Cassaly drowned before returning to St. Augustine. Gallum was left pregnant from the assault, giving birth to the child that same year. She then went to the Spanish courts and applied for financial assistance to help raise the son born from this rape. However, the community knew she owned considerable amounts of land, and her eldest daughter and son had both married into wealthy mixed-race families, so she was denied any aid by the courts. While she did not receive the compensation she was looking for, her usage of the court system shows that Ana had fully integrated into Spanish society and understood that the court system was a tool she could use to her advantage.

== Death ==
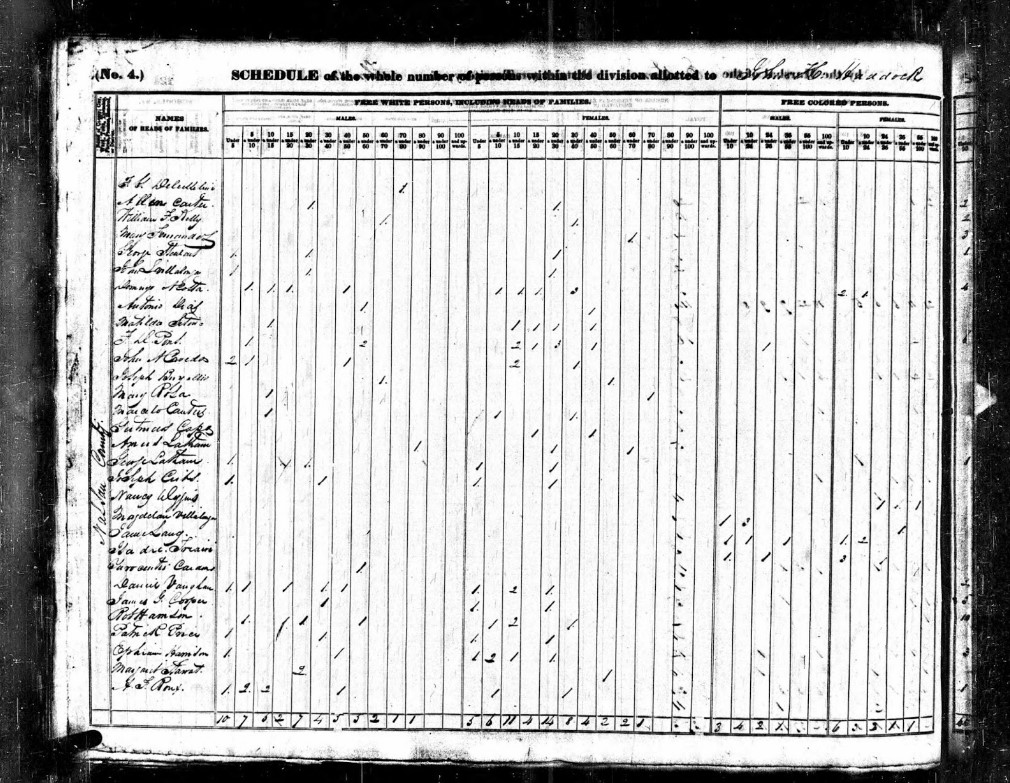
United States Federal Census 1840. Gallum is listed on this census under her married name, Nansi Wiggins.

The information surrounding the life of Ana Gallum is relatively sparse, and the same can be said about her death. The only detail surrounding her death is that Gallum died in 1840, according to 1840 United States census. As mentioned in "Early life", research suggests that Gallum was born sometime in 1755. Using her estimated birth year, it can be concluded that her age was approximately 85 at the time of her death.

== Legacy ==
Gallum spent most of her life a free woman in the Spanish colonies, enjoying the citizenship and rights afforded to many other women living under Spanish rule. This also allowed her to secure a far better life for her children. Her eldest son Benjamin became a translator on behalf of the local Indigenous tribes, spending time among the Seminoles and eventually marrying the daughter of prominent mixed-race planter and rancher, Felipe Edinborough. Her eldest daughter ― Beatriz ― married a mixed race man named Charles W. Clarke, the younger brother of prominent social and political figure George J.F. Clarke. Beatriz had six children with Clarke between 1799 and 1812. Eventually, Clarke and Beatrice, whom he often called "Patty" or "Particia", followed his brother and his family to Fernandina, Amelia Island, where they achieved a much better social status as freed Black people under Spanish rule.

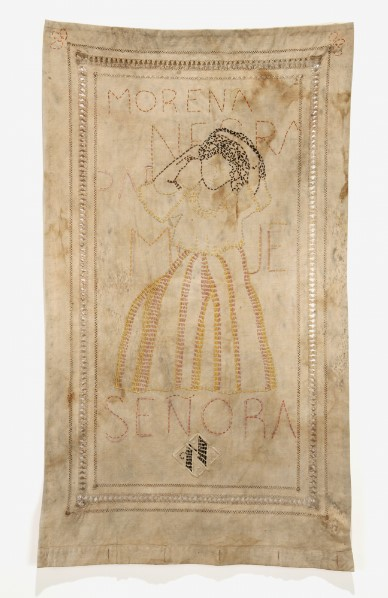
Image of Ana Gallum by fiber artist Karen Hampton

Another daughter of Gallum ㅡ Abigail Juana, called "Jennie" ㅡ also journeyed to Fernandina, where she and several of Gallum's other children were able to become landowners, most of them disappearing from historical record and fully integrating with white society. Gallum herself moved to Fernandina from Palatka in 1811 after losing the Wiggins' plantation due to a lack of agricultural development on the land and purchased three lots of property for herself and her youngest son, Pedro Cassaly II. When Florida eventually became a part of the United States with the Adams–Onís Treaty of 1819, Gallum and her children remained in the newly established state, while many other freed bondspeople emigrated to Cuba. As Spanish law termed the condition of slavery a "changeable legal situation" with little connection to the race or complexion of a bondsperson, Ana Gallum was able to use the Spanish legal system to her advantage to secure a life of moderate wealth for herself, and a far easier life for her children.

== See also ==
- Anna Kingsley
- Suzanne Amomba Paillé
- Elisabeth Samson
