= Kodjo =

Kodjo is both a surname and a given name. It can be an Akan day name.

Notable people with the name include:

== Surname ==
- Agbéyomé Kodjo (born 1954), Togolese politician and Prime Minister of Togo
- Edem Kodjo (born 1938), Togolese politician and diplomat

== Given name ==
- Kodjo (slave) (died 1833), Surinamese slave
- Kodjo Afanou (born 1977), French footballer
- Kodjo Akolor (born 1981), Swedish comedian
- Kodjo Menan (born 1959), Togolese diplomat

== See also ==
- Kojo
