= Presidential Palace of Suriname =

Coordinates: 5.826814°N 55.151245°W

Presidentieel paleis
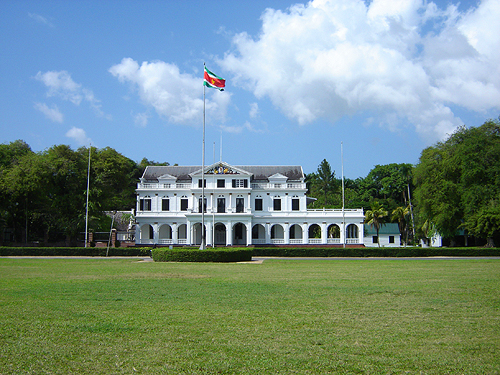
- Presidentieel paleis

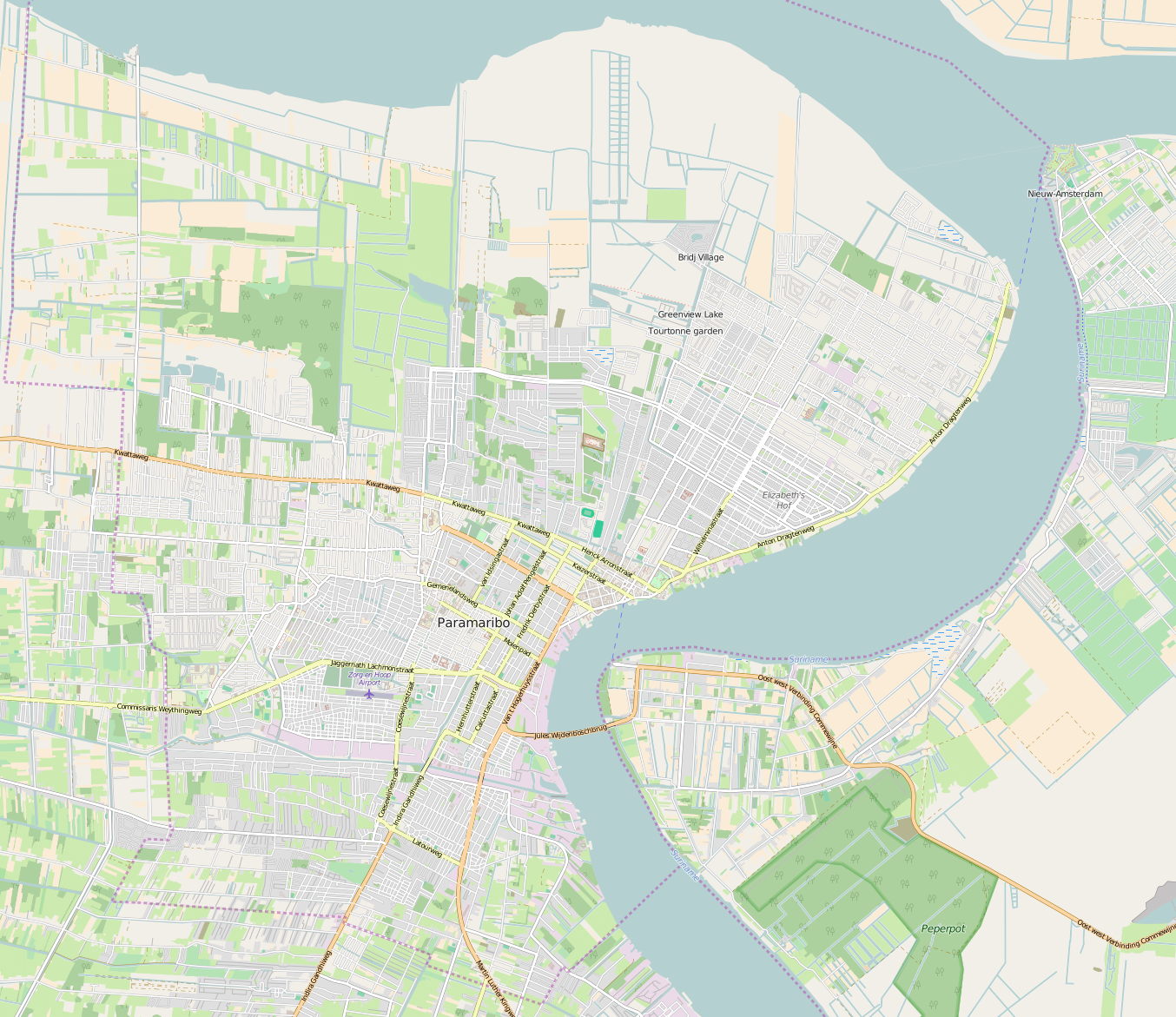
- Location within Paramaribo

General information
- Location: Paramaribo, Suriname
- Construction started: 18th century

The Presidential Palace of Suriname (Dutch: Presidentieel paleis van de Republiek Suriname) is the presidential palace of Suriname in the capital of Paramaribo. It is located across from The Independence Square (Onafhankelijkheidsplein), which also houses the National Assembly of Suriname, the Congress building, the Court of Justice, and the Ministry of Finance. It is one of the most prolific and best maintained examples of Dutch colonial architecture in Suriname and is part of the UNESCO world Heritage site of the Paramaribo inner-city. The Garden of Palms is located behind it.

== History ==
The current palace was built in 1730, when the then Governor-General of Suriname, Charel Emilius Hendrik de Cheusses led an expansion project of the already existing governor's palace. Before the major renovation of 1780 commissioned by Governor-General Bernard Texier, the palace underwent multiple changes, but was slowly falling into disrepair. When Texier took office, he decided to take up residence at the Gravenstraat 6. A grand gallery was added along with a third floor. But it wasn't until 1911 that the palace was expanded to its current size, with the addition of the portico and terrace. A decade later saw the completion of the one story west wing. The building received many ornamental additions, such as the arched beams of the balcony and the shield of the "Geoctrooieerde Sociëteit van Suriname" placed on the third story. The garden at the back was also redeveloped and extended towards The Palmentuin.

https://nationaalarchief.sr/erfgoed-en-slavernij/het-presidentieel-paleis

https://beeldbank.cultureelerfgoed.nl/rce-mediabank/detail/2004471a-f0f0-0fe4-6220-88b4e9fdfead

== Current Use ==
Although officially still the official residence of the head of state of Suriname, the President of Suriname, the palace is currently used as a venue for government and diplomatic events. It is the symbol of the Surinamese independence of 1975, and has since been known more commonly as "Het Presidentieel Paleis".
