= Adjei Kojo =

- Town
- Location within Ghana
- Coordinates: 5.6852847°N 0.0655354°E
- Country: Ghana
- Region: Greater Accra Region
- District: Tema West
- Time zone: GMT
  - Summer (DST): GMT

Adjei Kojo is a small town in the Tema West Constituency in the Greater Accra Region of Ghana, sharing a boundary with Ashaiman. The town is mostly known for the Tetteh Ocloo State School for the Deaf.
