= Garden of Palms =

- Palmentuin
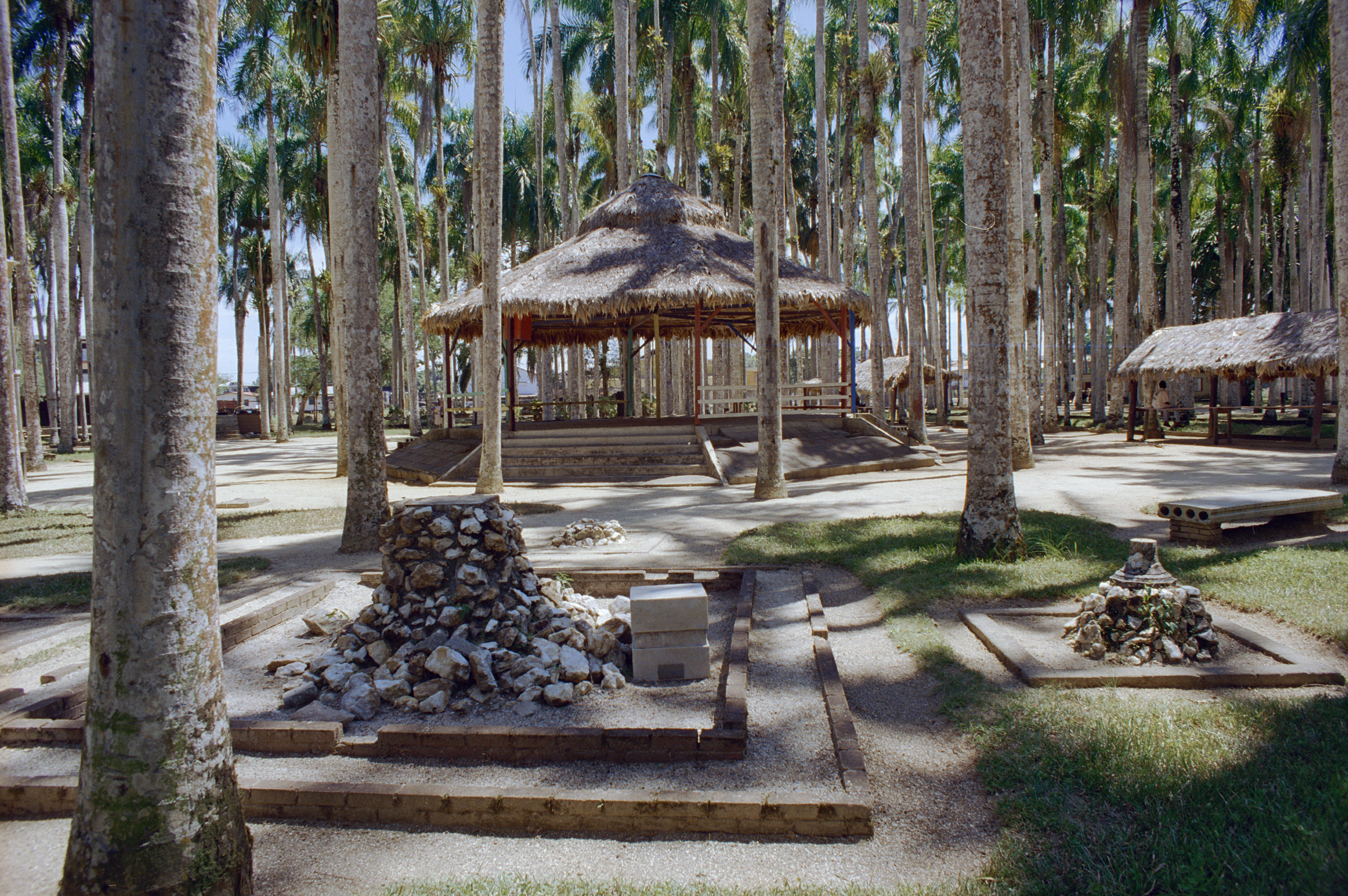
- Type: Urban park
- Location: Centrum, Paramaribo, Suriname
- Coordinates: 5.8282°N 55.1502°W
- Created: 1685

Garden of Palms or Palmgardens (Dutch: Palmentuin) is a palm tree landscape garden in Paramaribo, Suriname. In addition to tall royal palms, the grounds are home to tropical birds and a "troop" of capuchin monkeys. Palmentuin is located on Van Roseveltkade behind the Presidential Palace of Suriname and is a tourist attraction.

Royal palms were planted on the grounds by order of Cornelis van Aerssen van Sommelsdijck Governor of Suriname from 1683-1688. He opened the garden to the public in 1685. He was murdered in 1688 by a group of mutinous soldiers. Afterwards the garden was closed to the public until in the early 20th century. The park includes a playground and on holidays there are stalls. In 2002, the historic centre of Paramaribo was put on the World Heritage List at the UN and the garden was cited specifically as a feature. In 2009, the UNESCO made US $147,000 available to refurbish the palm garden.

In 2008, a statue of Henck Arron, the first Prime Minister of an independent Suriname, was placed in the Garden of Palms. In 2013, a bust of Trefossa, the composer of the national anthem, was placed in the park.

== Gallery ==
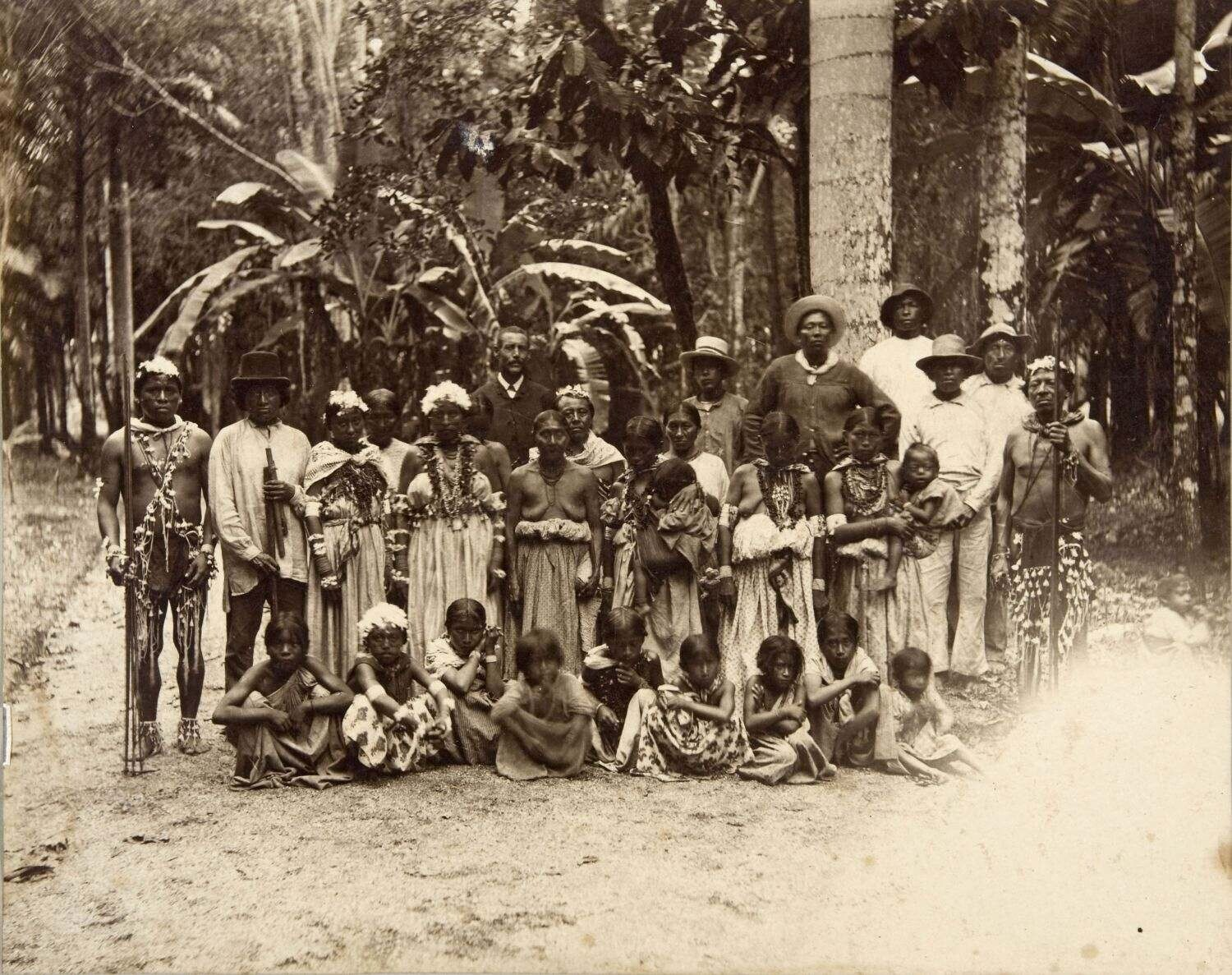
Festively attired Arawak Indians in the Palm Garden (Palmentuin) behind the Government House (Gouvernementshuis), late 19th century

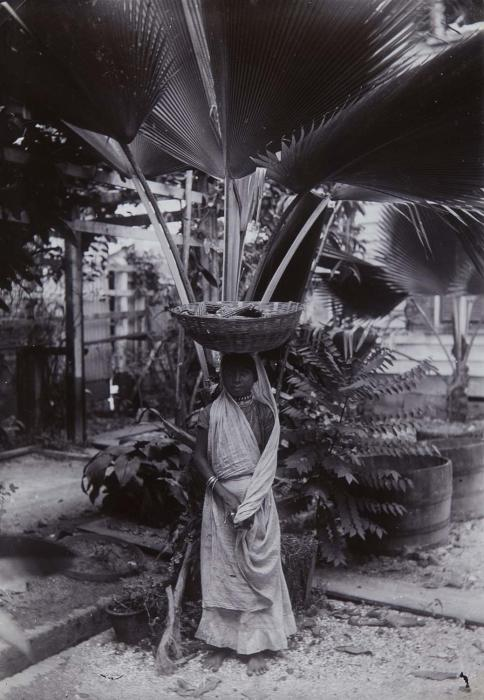
A woman selling corn at the garden circa 1920

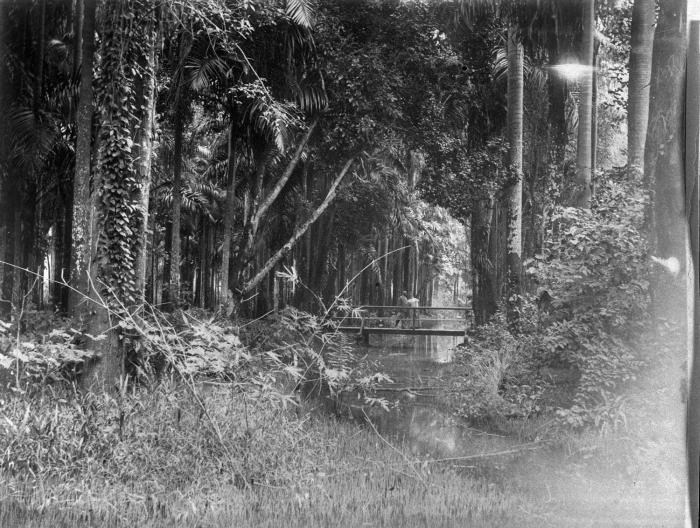
Late 19th century photo

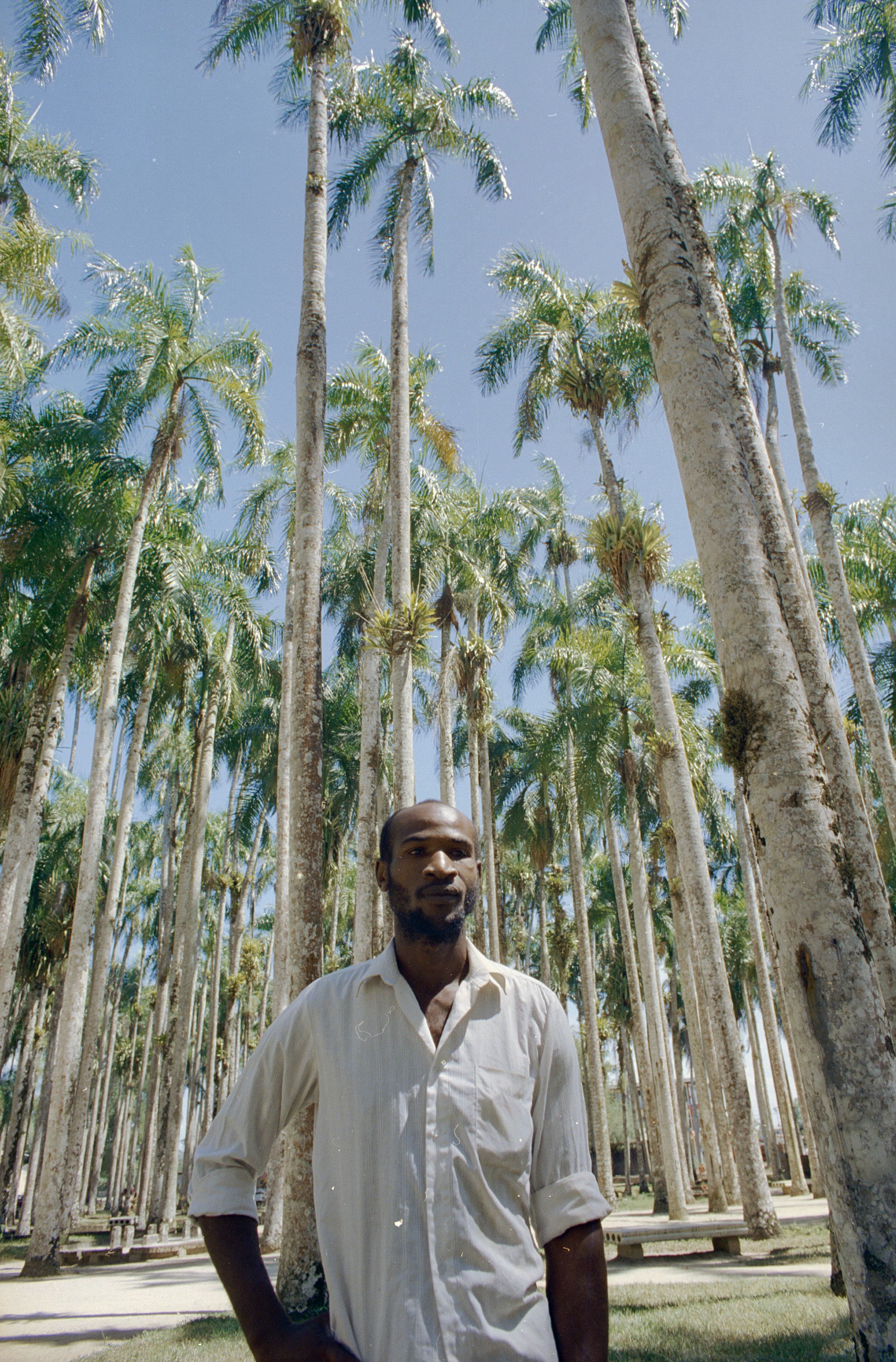

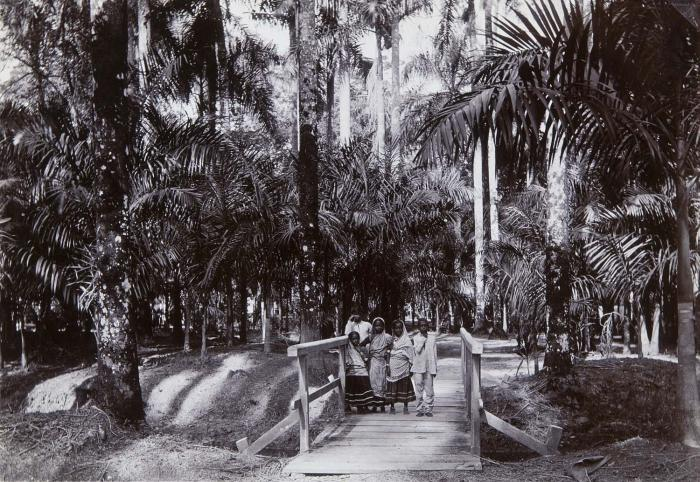
Circa 1920

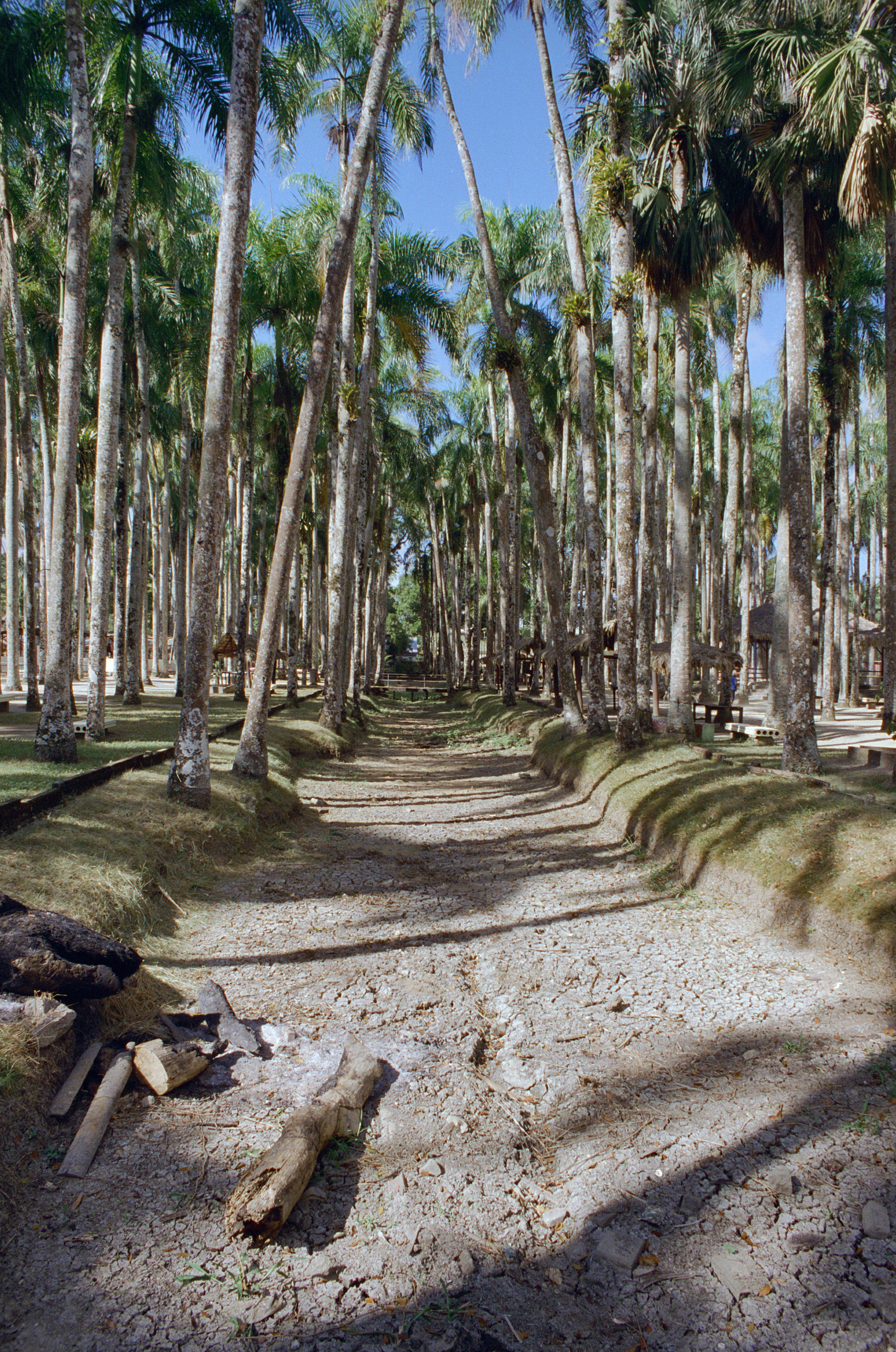
