= Kodjo (slave) =

Surinamese slave accused of arson in 1832

Coordinates: 5.82555°N 55.15711°W

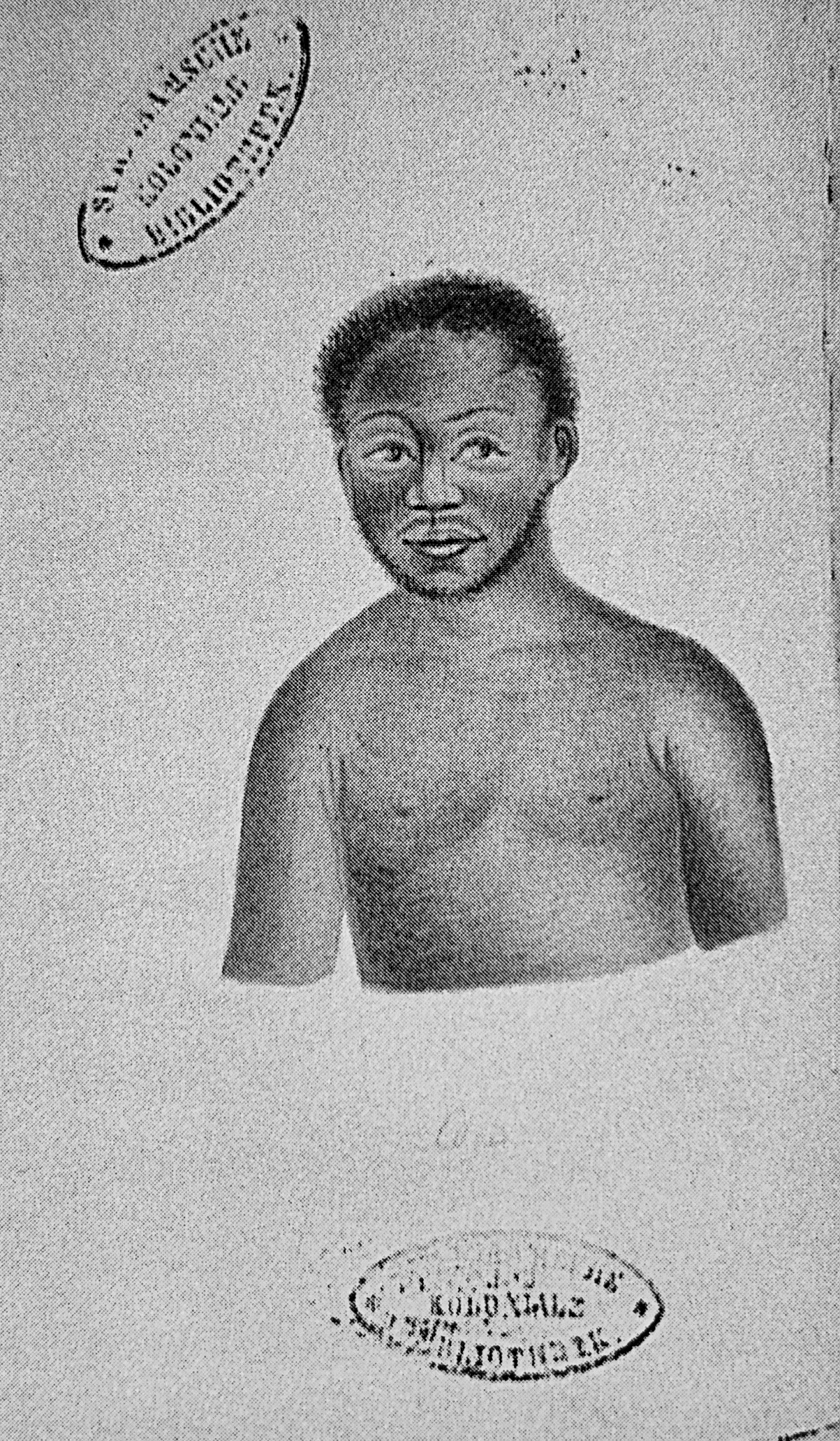
- Drawing of Kodjo (1833)
- Born: 1800s Surinam
- Died: 26 January 1833; Paramaribo, Suriname
- Other names: Cojo, Codjo, Andries
- Occupation: Slave

Kodjo also Cojo and Codjo (1800s – died 26 January 1833) was a Surinamese slave. On 26 January 1833, he was burnt alive for starting the 1832 fire in Paramaribo which caused the destruction of 46 houses. Kodjo used to be known as a criminal. Nowadays, he is remembered as a resistance fighter.

== Biography ==
Kodjo was born on a Monday, and therefore named Kodjo. He was a slave of D.M. Sanches, but seconded to Mrs. Smith who ran an inn in Paramaribo. Smith called him Andries, and was known for her cruelty. In July 1832, Kodjo had sold bread in the street. Upon his return, Smith counted the money, and discovered that 2½ cents were missing.

Kodjo ran away, and found refuge in Picornobosch in Kwatta near Paramaribo. In the forest, he banded together with Mentor, Present, and other slaves who had also escaped. The group occasionally went to the city to steal and rob supplies.

== Fire ==
On the night of 3 on 4 September 1832, Kodjo and his group, went to the house of Mozes Nunes Monsanto whom Kodjo knew well. After sneaking in, they proceeded to steal food from the kitchen. Kodjo went up to the bedroom where he observed a child and female slave asleep. He then set fire to the laundry and curtains, and proceeded to the shop where he stole some goods. The fire quickly spread out of control, and caused the destruction of 46 houses.

Present and Mentor were first arrested in connection with the arson. Kodjo and the others were arrested on 3 October. They were detained in Fort Zeelandia. Kodjo attempted to escape on 11 December 1832, but was apprehended by citizens and returned to the fort.

== Trial and execution ==
During the interrogation, Kodjo said that he wanted to burn down the city, and dispel the whites. On 10 January 1833, the slaves were charged with rebellion, and arson. Kodjo, Mentor and Present were found guilty of arson and rebellion, and sentenced to be burnt at the stake. Winst and Tom were only found guilty of rebellion, and therefore, sentenced to be hung. Four other run away slaves, were sentenced to 15 years hard labour. The execution would take place at the remains of the house of Monsanto. When Kodjo heard the sentence, he shouted: "Da ston srefi moesoe broko" (The stones must be broken), and smashed his handcuffs against the stone windowsill. On 26 January 1833, the execution was carried out. Kodjo was about 30 years old.

== Aftermath ==
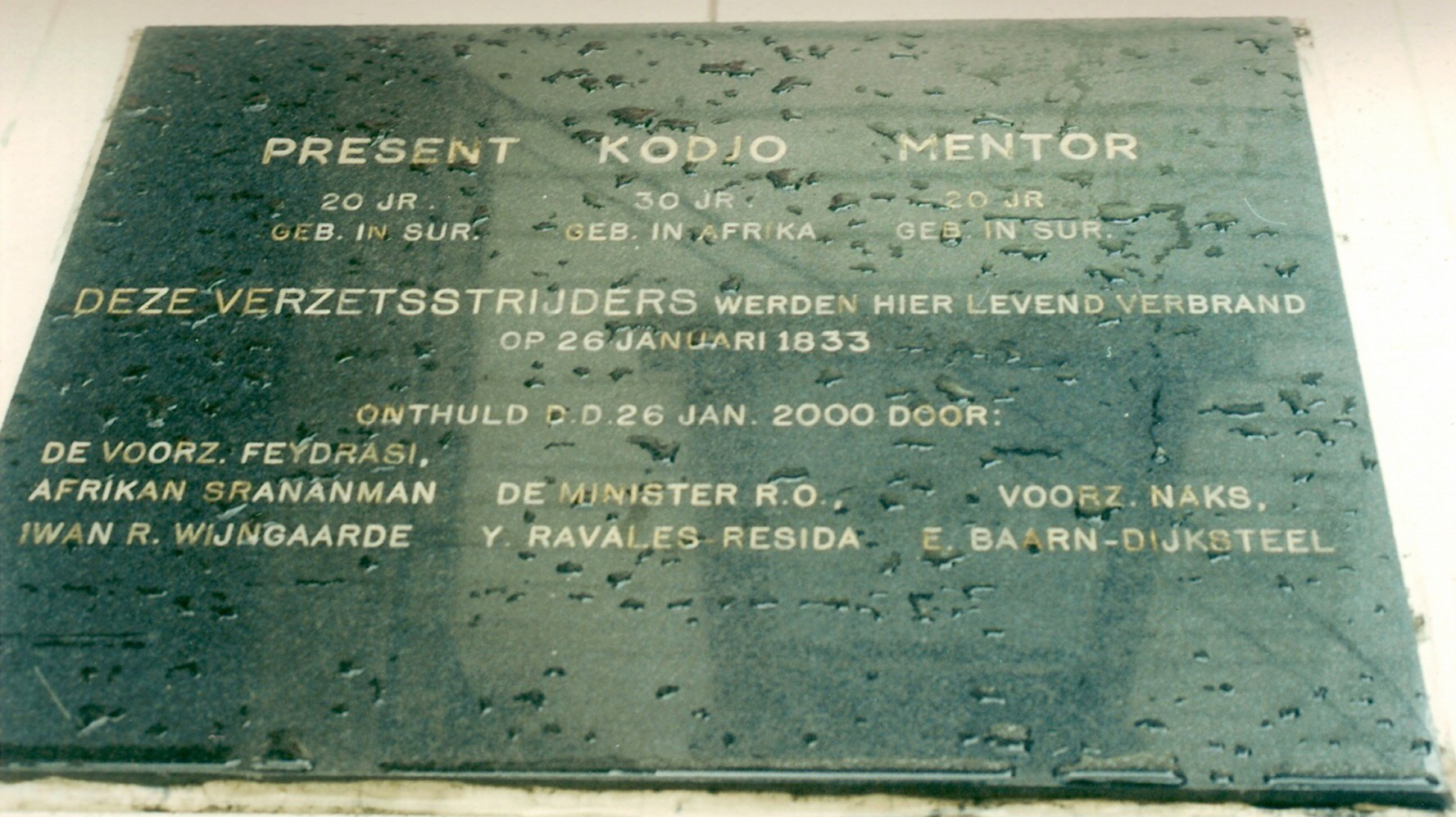
Memorial for Kodjo, Mentor and Present

Kodjo has been recognized as a resistance fighter. As of 1993, there is a yearly remembrance of the event. On 26 January 2000, the square near the former house of Monsanto was renamed Kodjo, Mentor en Present Pren, and Erwin de Vries was commissioned to build a monument for Kodjo, Mentor and Present.

== Bibliography ==
- Rikken, F.H. (1904). Codjo, de brandstichter (in Dutch). Paramaribo: Timmermans. (Historical novel)
- Teenstra, Marten Douwes (1842). De negerslaven in de kolonie Suriname (in Dutch). Dordrecht: Lagerweij. (Court record)
