= Elisabeth Samson =

Afro-Surinamese coffee plantation owner

- Born: c. 1715; Paramaribo, Suriname
- Died: 21 April 1771 (aged 55–56); Paramaribo, Suriname
- Occupations: Plantation owner, businesswoman

Elisabeth Samson (c. 1715 – 21 April 1771) was an Afro-Surinamese coffee plantation owner. She was born in about 1715 in Paramaribo to a freed slave, known as Mariana. All of her other siblings had been born as slaves and were emancipated by her half-brother Charlo Jansz. Raised in the home of her half-sister Maria Jansz, Samson was taught to read and write by her brothers-in law who also trained her in business. She began acquiring property at the age of 19, but was banished from the colony in 1736 after being convicted of slander. Her appeal, heard by the Dutch Parliament, was successful and she returned to Suriname in 1739.

After acquiring slaves and two small coffee plantations, Samson entered a relationship with Carl Otto Creutz. Creutz was a soldier who was deeded property in 1749 by the governor for his service in making peace with local maroons. Focused on his military career and colonial politics, he turned his plantation, Clevia, over to Samson's management. She brought her own slaves to work on his plantation and within two years, the couple drew up a document confirming their joint ownership of Clevia, as well as of a cattle ranch and two townhomes in the city of Paramaribo. When he died in 1762, his half-ownership and other properties passed jointly to Samson and his brothers but she bought out their interests within two years. Samson continued to acquire properties with various family members, including her sister Nanette, with whom she established a successful export business, which traded using her own ship.

In 1767, she married Hermanus Daniel Zobre (1737—1784), and became the first black woman in Suriname to marry a white man. She was a major coffee plantation owner and coffee export trader until her death in 1771. Her success as a business person, black slave owner, and her marriage to a white partner, challenged both the gender and racial norms of the times. While her personal history provides insight into the ways black and mixed-race women contributed to the economy and challenged social norms, it also expands knowledge of 18th-century social organization in Suriname. Her life and the controversies surrounding her choices have been examined by modern scholarship and in literary studies.

== Early life ==
Elisabeth Samson was born in 1715 in Paramaribo, Suriname, as the youngest child of a freedwoman, who had taken the name Mariana upon her emancipation from slavery, and an unknown black father. Mariana had originally been known as Nanoe and was brought to Suriname around 1700 from Saint Kitts by her owner Jan van Susteren. Susteren fathered two older siblings with Nanoe, Charlo and Maria Jansz, before his death in 1712. His will instructed that Nanoe and their two children were to be freed, though Nanoe's six other children by black men were to remain in slavery to his wife. These three family members attained their freedom in 1713, with the result that when she was born, Elisabeth was a free "negress". (Note: According to historian Cynthia McLeod, 18th century racial distinctions in Suriname were clearly delineated markers of social status and one could only be negro if there was no mixed ancestry. Children of a white and black union were known as mulattos while those of a mulatto or an indigenous person and a white person were known as mesties, whereas the union of a mulatto and a negro or indigenous person produced children identified as karboeger. There were other distinctions for people of lesser degrees of non-white blood. The fact that Samson, in an official letter declared herself to be "a free-born Negress" identifies her father and mother as both being of African descent.) Samson's half-brother Charlo, purchased the rest of his siblings from Susteren's widow and before his death in 1732 had managed to obtain manumission for each of them.

Samson was raised in the household of her half-sister Maria and her husband Pierre Mivela, a Swiss merchant and owner of the Salzhallen Plantation. When Mivela died, Maria remarried a planter, Frederick Coenraad Bossche, who continued to provide a home for Samson. In the homes of both her brothers-in-law, Samson was taught to read and write and also learned to count. She was baptized when she was ten years old and the certificate noted her knowledge of the bible. From an early age, she worked with Bossche in his importing business and by 19 had begun to acquire her own property. In 1736, Samson was convicted of slander for having spread rumors about an alleged dispute between Governor Johan Raye van Breukelerwaard and a local coppersmith, Mr. Peltser (Pelzer) and his wife. Convicted and banished from the colony in 1737, she went to the Netherlands to appeal the verdict. A lawyer, hired by Bossche filed the case with the States General in The Hague, where Samson was residing in exile, and worked on the case for nearly two years from Suriname. In 1739, she was exonerated and allowed to return home.

== Career ==
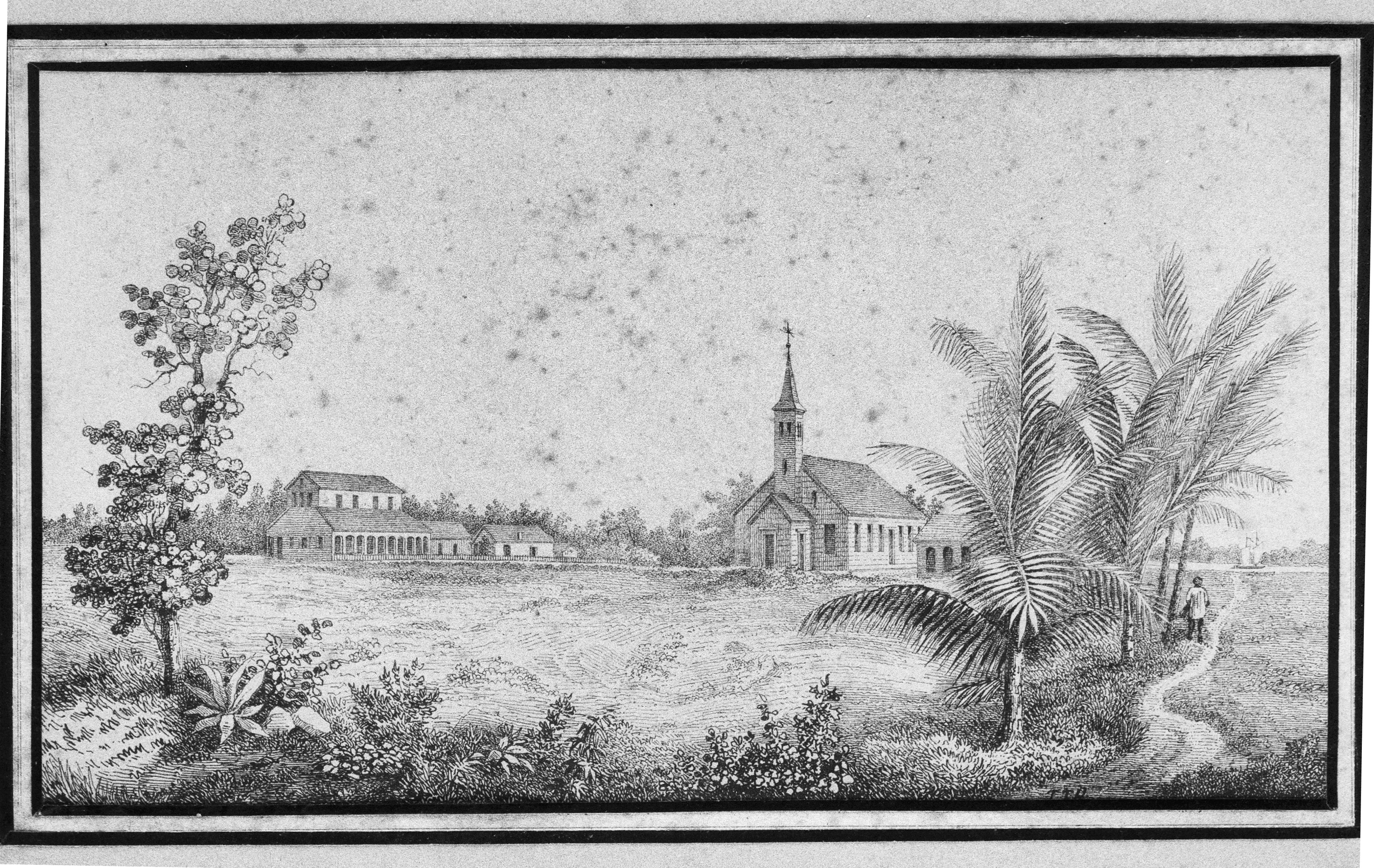
Clevia Plantation, near Paramaribo, Suriname

Samson began to acquire slaves and purchased the Toevlught and Welgemoed coffee plantations over the next three years. In her mid-twenties, she became involved in a business and personal relationship with Carl Otto Creutz. He was from Emmerich am Rhein in the Duchy of Cleves, had come to Suriname in 1733 as an army cadet, and lived in the home of Samson's sister and brother-in-law. Rising through the ranks to captain and successfully assisting Governor Jan Jacob Mauricius in negotiating peace with the local maroons, Creutz was awarded a 1,000-acre plantation, Clevia, in 1749. To work the plantation, Samson brought her 200 slaves, who had remained her personal property. (Note: From the 17th century, Dutch women were allowed to maintain property in their own right, operating as feme soles, which entitled them to economically operate with largely the same privileges as males, though their wages were not typically adequate to provide for independent living. Women were denied the right to an education and public interaction, such as voting, and were not accepted as citizens until the end of the eighteenth century. Colonial Dutch women who decided to marry, had the option to choose a manus marriage, subjecting herself to coverture, or a usus marriage, maintaining her separate identity. In the 18th century, unmarried Dutch women, upon reaching their majority, were required by law to choose a guardian to represent them in legal proceedings; whereas married women were forbidden to enter into financial transactions on their own. Slaves were typically considered to be inventory of a plantation, but in Samson's case, she specifically stated in the registration documents for Clevia that the slaves were her personal property. Rosemarijn Hoefte, notes how unusual free black women's ownership of slaves was. In 1731 a free black male registered as the first slaveholder; in 1735 three free black women registered as slave owners. Through 1752, only four free black women had registered as owning slaves, among whom were Samson and her sisters Catharina and Nanette.) In 1750, the plantation was registered with local authorities to confirm their cohabitation and in 1751, a legal document was drawn up showing that Samson and Creutz had joint ownership of Clevia; a nearby cattle ranch, La Solitude; and two townhomes in Paramaribo. Creutz became involved in colonial politics, rising to membership in the Court of Policy, leaving Samson in charge of running their estates.

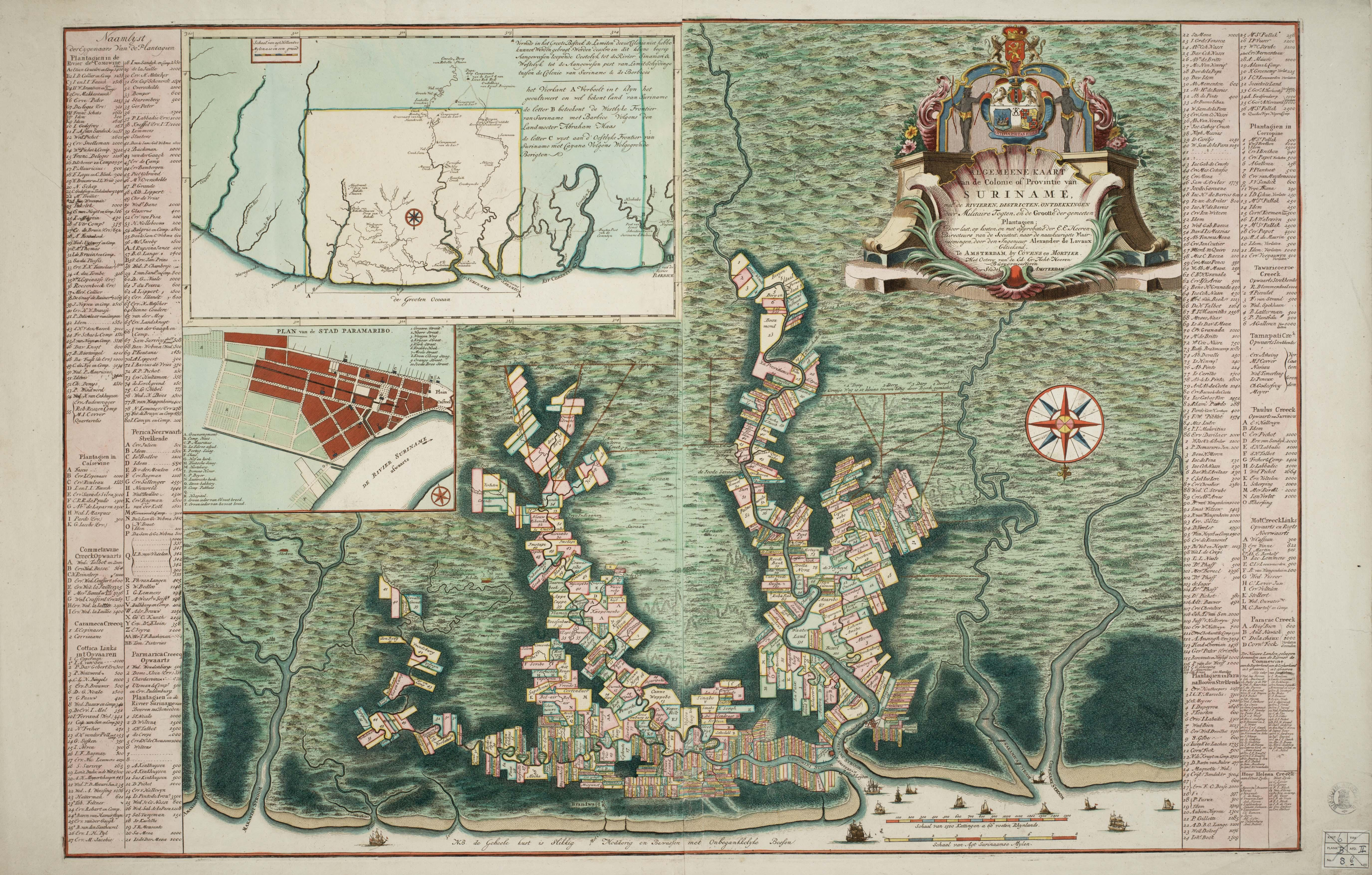
1737 Map of Suriname shows Samson family members owning property in the Hoer Helena Creek section

Their lavish home in Paramaribo was next door to the governor's house and was fitted with all the finery money could buy, including crystal chandeliers, china, mahogany furnishings, silver, a wine cellar and luxurious fabrics. The 44 house slaves lived in a separate property adjacent to their stables which were across the street from the main home. Above the stables was an apartment and next door was the other townhome the couple owned. Both were rented out to tenants. During his campaigns with the maroons, Creutz contracted malaria and from 1753 suffered from repeated periods of sickness from the disease. He died in November 1762 and Samson then inherited his half of their joint holdings for use during her lifetime, which would pass to his brothers when she died. Unwilling to have merely a life tenancy she prepared a purchase offer for the Creutz brothers which they accepted. Over the next two years, Samson paid the brothers ƒ155,000 (around £2,400,000 in 2023), becoming sole owner of the properties.

In 1764, Samson wrote to the Council of Policy and the governor, seeking permission to marry. Her fiancé was Christopher Polycarpus Braband, a white man who was the organist of the local Dutch Reformed Church and a tenant in one of her properties. Her request was denied in accordance with the 1685 law of Suriname which prohibited blacks and whites from marrying. Undaunted, she had her legal representatives in the Netherlands ask permission directly from the board of the Society of Suriname, which prompted the local authorities to write to the Society asking them to deny the request. Their appeal stated that the only argument in favor of the union was that her wealth might pass out of black hands and return to white possession after her death. Unable to reach a decision, the directors of the Society forwarded the request to the parliament. It took the States General three years to review the case, but they concluded that the colonial law differed from Dutch law, which did not exclude interracial marriage and that Dutch law overruled local statutes. Though Samson was now allowed to marry a white man, her fiancé had died in January 1766, during the drawn out legal proceedings.

Samson was not idle, while waiting for the decision on her marriage. Her older sister, Catharina Opperman had died in 1764 and left the plantations Vlaardingen and Catharinasburg to her sisters Elisabeth and Nanette Samson. The sisters then jointly purchased Belwaarde Plantation, the neighboring estate to Clevia and formerly owned by Governor Mauricius and began operating a coffee export business. Samson commissioned a shipyard in Amsterdam to build a frigate, the Miss Nanette and Miss Elisabeth, for their trade goods. The ship was completed and arrived in Suriname in 1767, where bags marked with the initials of the sisters and the plantation where the coffee was grown were loaded and shipped to overseas ports of call. When approval for her marriage to a white man was finally received in August of that year, Samson was resolute in wanting to increase her social standing by having a legitimate marriage. On 21 December 1767, she exchanged vows with a much younger man, Hermanus Daniel Zobre, (1737–1784) who had immigrated from The Hague in hopes of becoming a planter and was a neighbor of her sister Nanette. With her nuptials completed, Samson became the first black woman to be legally married to a white man in Suriname.

In 1768, Samson drew up a will leaving cash of ƒ23,000 (around £4,000,000 in 2023) to her family members and her real property to her husband. The coffee exports of 1768 and 1769 of the Samson sisters were profitably sold in Amsterdam, earning her an estimated annual income of between ƒ30,000–100,000 (around £5,000,000-17,500,000 in 2023) at a time when the colonial governor annually earned ƒ10,600 (£1,800,000 in 2023). The Miss Nanette and Miss Elisabeth was wrecked off the coast of North Carolina in 1769 and though the crew was rescued, the cargo was lost. In 1770, Samson and her sister Nanette each inherited 1/4 of their sister Maria's Salzhallen Plantation. At her death, Samson owned full interest in the Clevia, De Goede Vreed, Toevlugt and Welgemoed plantations and the La Solitude ranch. She also owned a half interest with her sister Nanette in the Belwaarde, Catharinasburg, Onverwacht, and Vlaardingen plantations, as well as a country estate; a quarter interest in the Salzhalen Plantation; and owned six homes in her own name and a half-interest in six other residences.

== Death and legacy ==
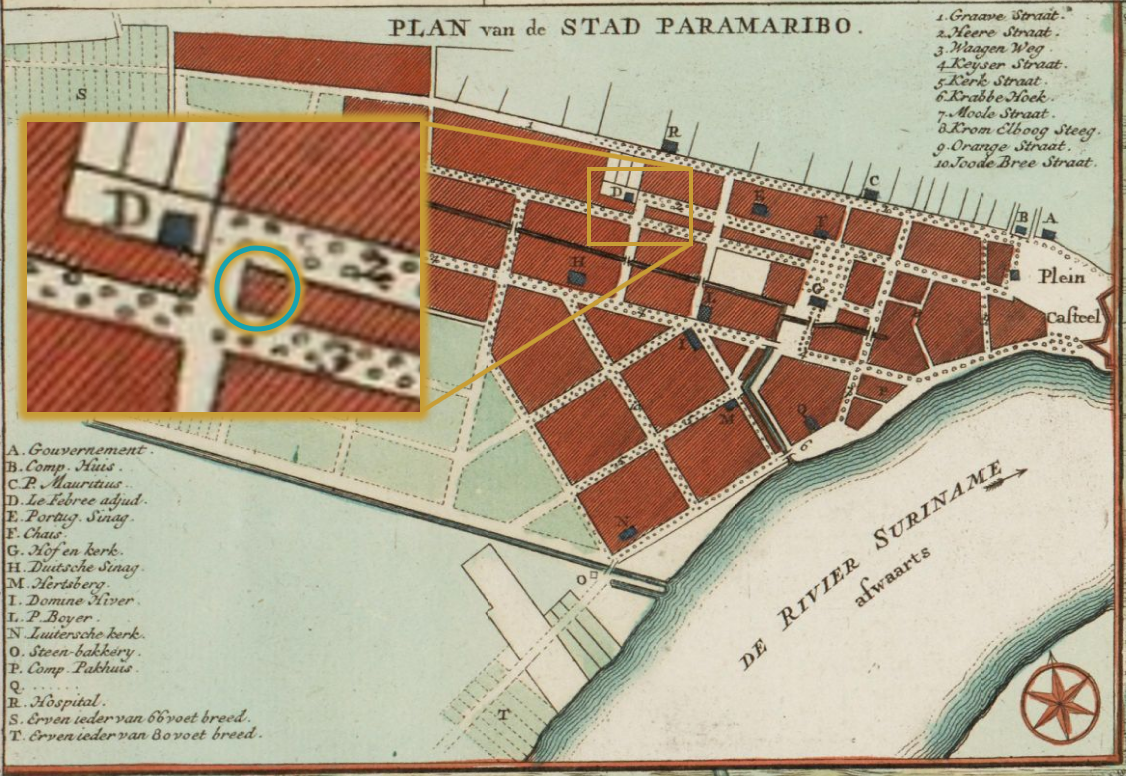
Location map for Samson's home at 22 Wagenwegstraat, Paramaribo

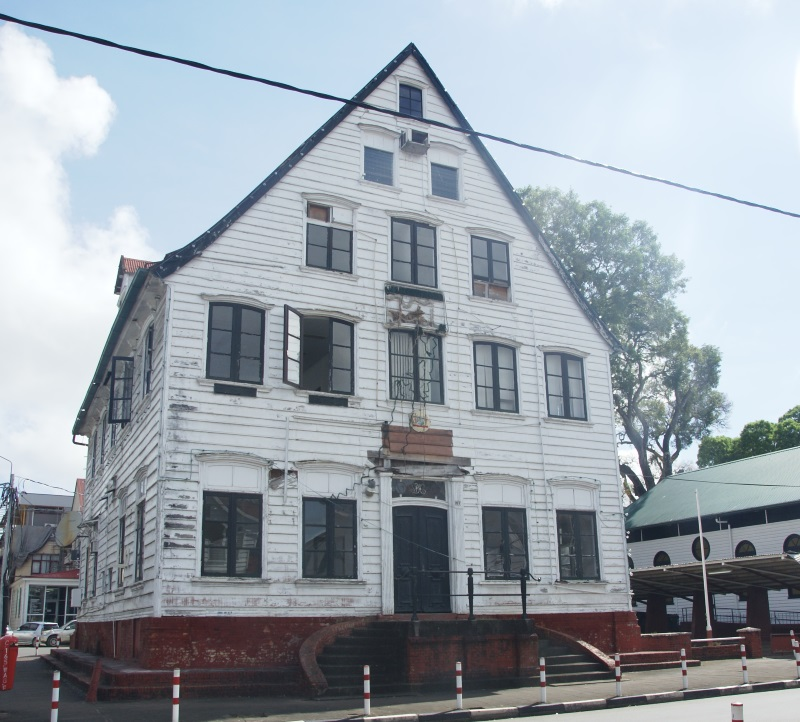
Samson's home, 22 Wagenwegstraat, Paramaribo, 2016

Samson died on 21 April 1771 and was buried without a headstone at the New Orange Garden Cemetery in Paramaribo. Her husband inherited over ƒ1,000,000 (around £165,600,000 in 2023) of property, which he promptly mortgaged and lived lavishly on the proceeds. A crop failure in 1772 and a bank crash in Amsterdam in 1773 then led him to take out a mortgage on Belwaarde. Unaware that he had mortgaged the property, Nanette tried to pay back the mortgage, but eventually declared bankruptcy in 1778. When Zobre died in 1784, having never paid the mortgages and with his family refusing the inheritance because of the debt, Jan and Theo Marselis, who owned a mercantile business in Amsterdam took over all of Samson's former estates.

As she had no children and her husband squandered her legacy, Samson was obscured in the historic record, often reflected as part of local folklore until writer and historian Cynthia McLeod decided to research her life, in 1988. Expanding her search beyond Suriname, McLeod consulted Dutch archives in Amsterdam, Rotterdam, and The Hague, as well as records in Germany, piecing together and salvaging Samson's life story. Her history gives insight, not only into how black and mixed-race women were able to impact the economy of the Caribbean region and challenge social constructs in the 18th century, but also providing details of the larger society of Suriname in the period. The Elisabeth Samson House located at 22 Wagenwegstraat in Paramaribo has been declared part of the historic city center and was added to South America's World Heritage Sites by UNESCO in 2002. McLeod has lobbied for years to conserve the property and in 2019 established a foundation, hoping to raise adequate funding for faithful restoration of the home to how appeared in Samson's lifetime.

McLeod has repeatedly written about Samson in such historical studies as Bronnen van Afro-Surinaamse Samenlevingen (Sources from Afro-Surinamese Societies, 1993) and Elisabeth Samson: Een vrije zwarte vrouw in het achttiende-eeuwse Suriname (Elisabeth Samson: A Free Black Woman in Eighteenth-century Suriname, 1994) and a novel, De vrije negerin Elisabeth (The Free Negress Elisabeth, 2000), which was published in English in 2004. In 2014, Elisabeth Samson versus de Nederlandse Staat (Elisabeth Samson versus the State of the Netherlands), a play by the theater group Urban Myth, premiered at the Stadsschouwburg in Amsterdam. The performance explored Samson's life and whether her ambition to use her wealth and power to gain equal legal treatment was solely for her own benefit. Written by the novelist, Karin Amatmoekrim, the play examined Samson's long quest to marry a white man and find her place in white society, calling into question why she had not worked to free other black people from slavery.

== See also ==
- Ana Gallum
- Anna Kingsley
- Dorothy Thomas (entrepreneur)
