= Tour de Borobudur =

Race details
- Region: Central Java, Indonesia
- Nickname(s): TDB
- Discipline: Road
- Organiser: Central Java Provincial Government

History
- First edition: 2000
- Editions: 17 (As of 2017)

Tour de Borobudur (abbreviated TDB) is a cycling race, which is held annually in Central Java, Indonesia. The race has been held since 2000. It is an annual sports tourism event with accompanying social activities in which cyclists ride along a route that passes by tourist spots in Central Java, such as Sam Poo Kong Temple in Semarang, Kreo Cave, Mount Merapi, and Lake Rawa Pening.

The race is organized as three categories, namely A (200 km), B (100 km) and VVIP. The race starts at Semarang City Hall and has an end point for all categories at Borobudur Temple.
