= Rice production in Indonesia =

Agricultural statistics in Indonesia

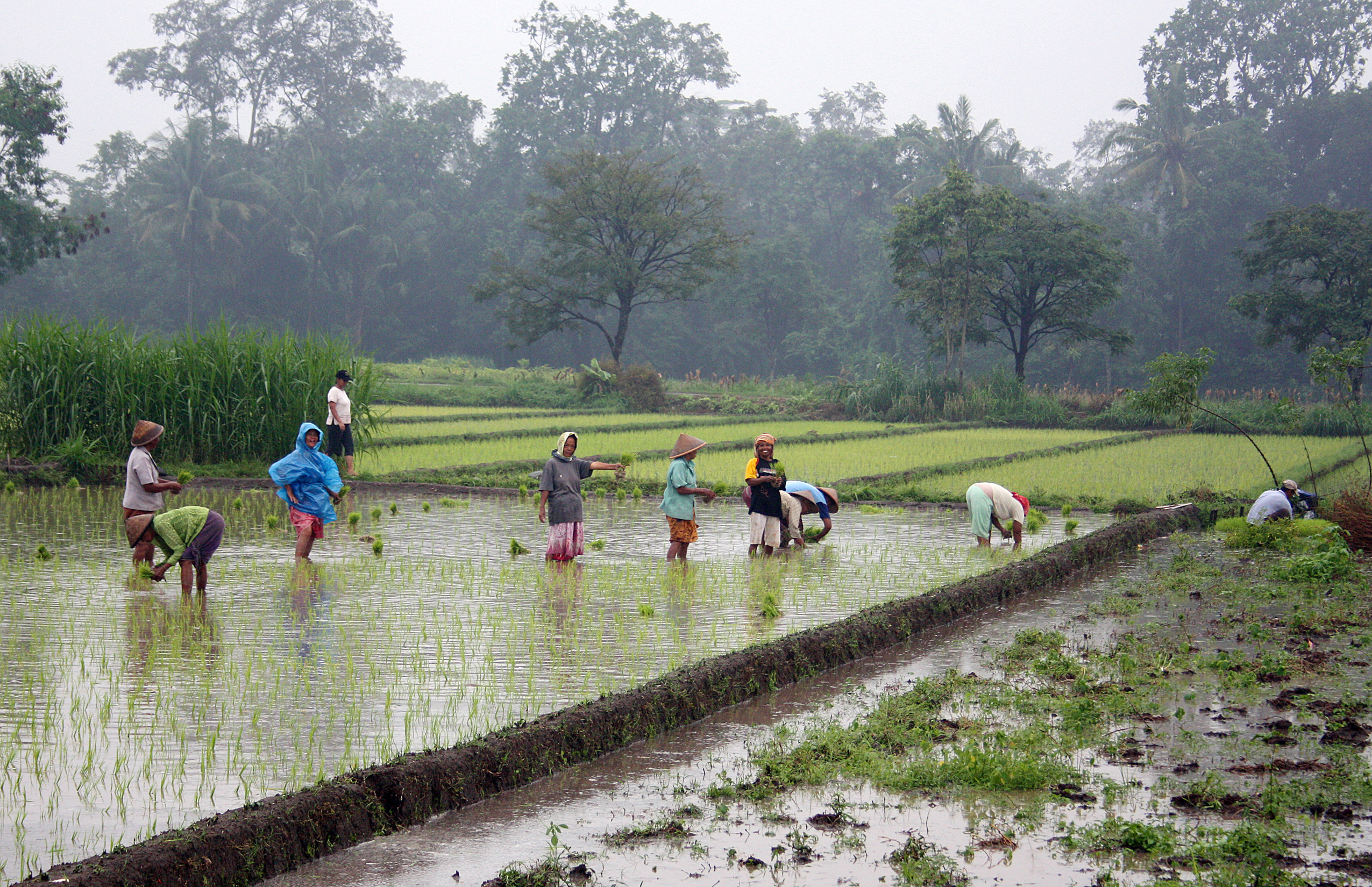
Javanese women planting rice in a ricefield near Prambanan, Yogyakarta

Rice production in Indonesia is an important part of the national economy. Indonesia is the fourth-largest producer of rice in the world.

Rice is the staple food in the Indonesian diet, accounting for a large amount of calories in the average diet. A typical Indonesian meal consists of richly flavored side dishes, meat or poultry and vegetables, surrounding a pile of steamed rice.

Rice cultivation is the source of livelihood for about 20 million households, or about 100 million people, in the late 1980s. Rice cultivation covered a total of around 10 million hectares throughout the archipelago, primarily on sawah. Indonesia is the 4th largest rice producer in the world after India, China, and Bangladesh. However, because of Indonesia's large population, the rice it produces is consumed internally.

As a vital necessity for Indonesian households, the government is responsible to regulate rice price and availability through Indonesian Bureau of Logistics (Bulog), which ensure its continuous supply and price stability. To ensure food security, the government fills the gap by importing from neighboring countries like Thailand, Vietnam and Cambodia.

The supply and control of water is crucial to the productivity of rice land, especially when planted with high-yield seed varieties. In 1987 irrigated sawah covered 58 percent of the total cultivated area, rainfed sawah accounted for 20 percent, and ladang, or dryland cultivation, together with swamp or tidal cultivation covered the remaining 22 percent of rice cropland.

== History ==
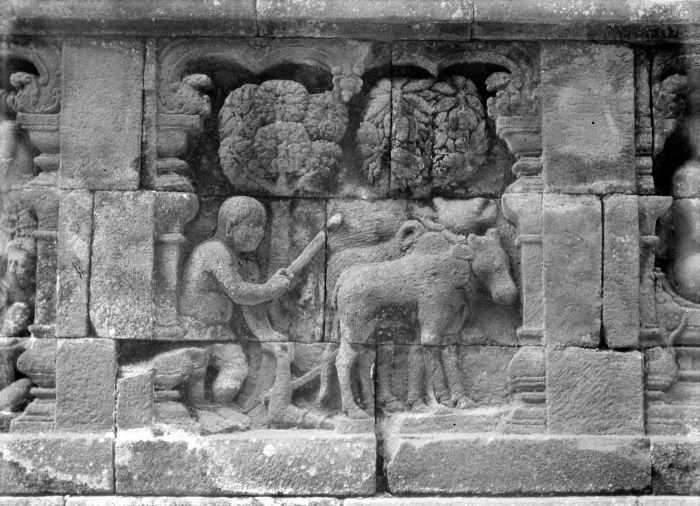
The bas-relief in 8th century Borobudur depicting farmer plowing the field pulled by buffalo

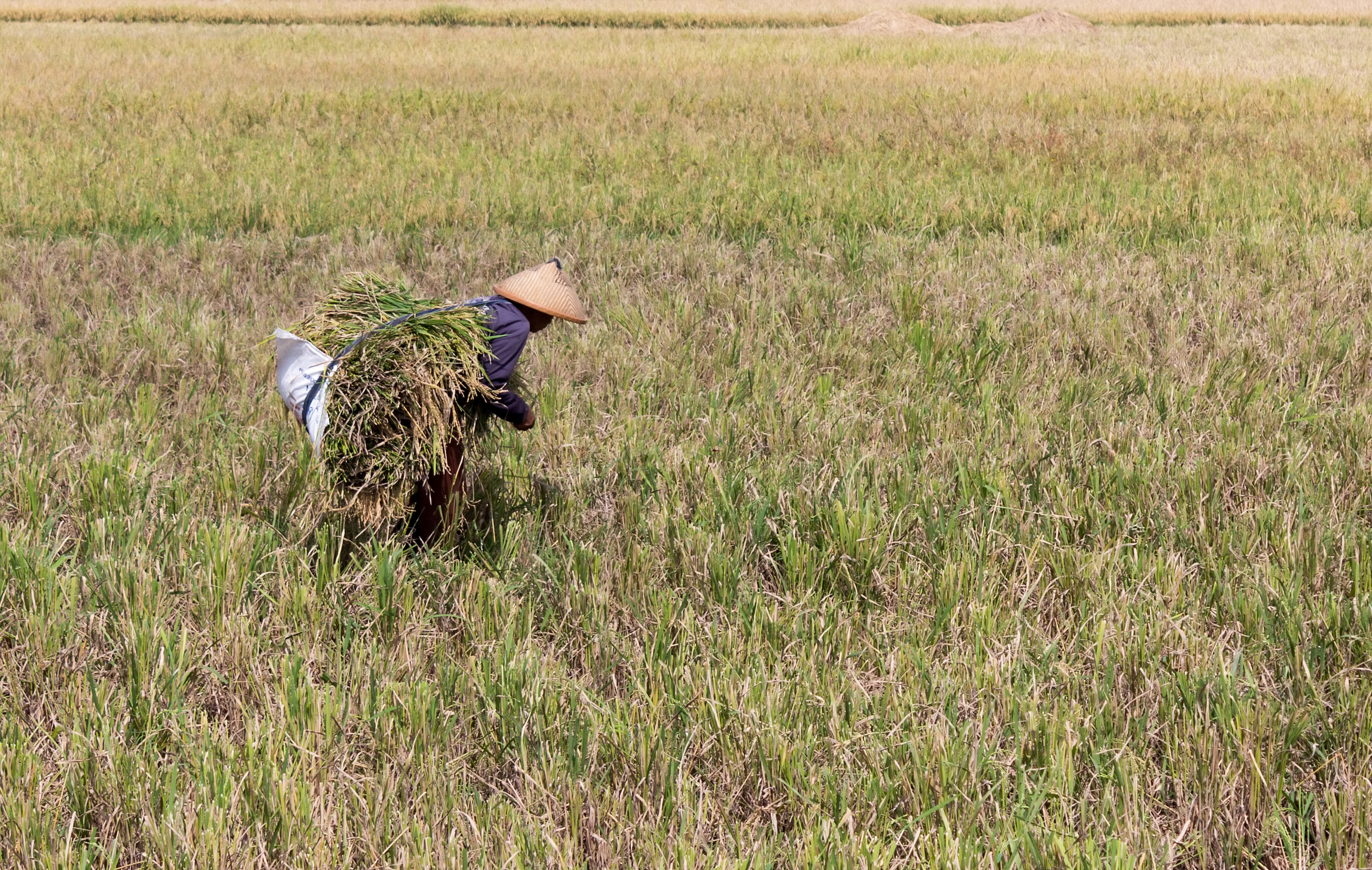
Rice harvest at Kampoeng Rawa, Ambarawa

Rice is a staple food for all classes in contemporary Indonesia, and it holds the central place in Indonesian culture and Indonesian cuisine: it shapes the landscape; is sold at markets; and is served in most meals both as a savoury and a sweet food. The importance of rice in Indonesian culture is demonstrated through the reverence of Dewi Sri, the rice goddess of ancient Java and Bali. Traditionally the agricultural cycles linked to rice cultivations were celebrated through rituals, such as Sundanese Seren Taun rice harvest festival. In Bali the traditional subak irrigation management was created to ensure the water supplies for rice paddies, managed by priest and created around "water temples".

Rice is most often eaten as plain rice with just a few protein and vegetable dishes as side dishes. It is also served, however, as nasi uduk (rice cooked in coconut milk), nasi kuning (rice cooked with coconut milk and turmeric), ketupat (rice steamed in woven packets of coconut fronds), lontong (rice steamed in banana leaves), intip or rengginang (rice crackers), desserts, vermicelli, noodles, arak beras (rice wine), and nasi goreng (fried rice). Nasi goreng is omnipresent in Indonesia and considered as national dish.

Evidence of wild rice on the island of Sulawesi dates from 3000 BC. Evidence for the earliest cultivation, however, comes from eighth century stone inscriptions from the central island of Java, which show kings levied taxes in rice. The images of rice cultivation, rice barn, and mouse pest infesting a rice field is evident in Karmawibhangga bas-reliefs of Borobudur. Divisions of labour between men, women, and animals that are still in place in Indonesian rice cultivation, were carved into relief friezes on the ninth century Prambanan temples in Central Java: a water buffalo attached to a plough; women planting seedlings and pounding grain; and a man carrying sheaves of rice on each end of a pole across his shoulders (pikulan). In the sixteenth century, Europeans visiting the Indonesian islands saw rice as a new prestige food served to the aristocracy during ceremonies and feasts.

Rice production in Indonesian history is linked to the development of iron tools and the domestication of Wild Asian Water Buffalo as water buffalo for cultivation of fields and manure for fertilizer. Rice production requires exposure to the sun. Once covered in dense forest, much of the Indonesian landscape has been gradually cleared for permanent fields and settlements as rice cultivation developed over the last fifteen hundred years.

== Supply and trade regulations ==
Amount of production and import of rice in Indonesia (1955-1988)
Year	Production (in tonne)	Import (in tonne)
1955	14,432,000	127,000
1960	16,860,000	966,000
1961	12,084,000	1,063,760
1962	13,004,000	1,096,050
1963	11,595,000	1,075,310
1964	12,306,000	1,024,450
1965	12,975,000	193,000
1966	13,650,000	306,000
1967	13,222,000	346,600
1968	17,162,800	485,900
1969	18,020,200	604,600
1970	19,331,000	956,130
1971	20,190,000	506,000
1972	19,393,600	734,300
1973	21,489,500	1,862,690
1974	22,473,010	1,132,070
1975	22,339,200	691,780
1976	23,300,940	1,301,180
1977	23,347,140	1,973,360
1978	25,771,600	1,841,580
1979	26,282,660	1,922,030
1980	29,651,900	2,011,710
1981	32,774,180	538,280
1982	33,583,700	309,640
1983	35,303,010	1,168,480
1984	38,136,450	414,330
1985	39,032,940	33,830
1986	39,726,770	27,760
1987	40,078,190	54,980
1988	41,676,180	32,730

Amount of production and import of rice in Indonesia (1989-2018)
Year	Production (in tonne)	Import (in tonne)
1989	44,725,580	268,200
1990	45,178,750	49,390
1991	44,688,240	170,970
1992	48,240,010	609,560
1993	48,129,321	23,780
1994	46,598,380	629,860
1995	49,697,444	3,154,910
1996	51,048,899	2,147,780
1997	49,339,086	329,310
1998	49,236,692	2,891,680
1999	50,866,000	4,671,220
2000	51,899,000	1,338,990
2001	50,461,000	639,540
2002	51,490,000	1,790,320
2003	52,137,000	1,613,420
2004	54,088,000	700,000
2005	54,200,000	600,000
2006	54,500,000	700,000
2007	57,200,000	1,800,000
2008	60,300,000	300,000
2009	64,400,000	300,000
2010	66,500,000	1,000,000
2011	65,800,000	2,900,000
2012	69,100,000	1,800,000
2013	71,300,000	700,000
2014	70,800,000	1,000,000
2015	73,000,000	1,300,000
2016	72,600,000	1,300,000
2017	73,900,000(Estimate)	400,000(Estimate)
2018	74,500,000(Forecast)	1,500,000(Forecast)

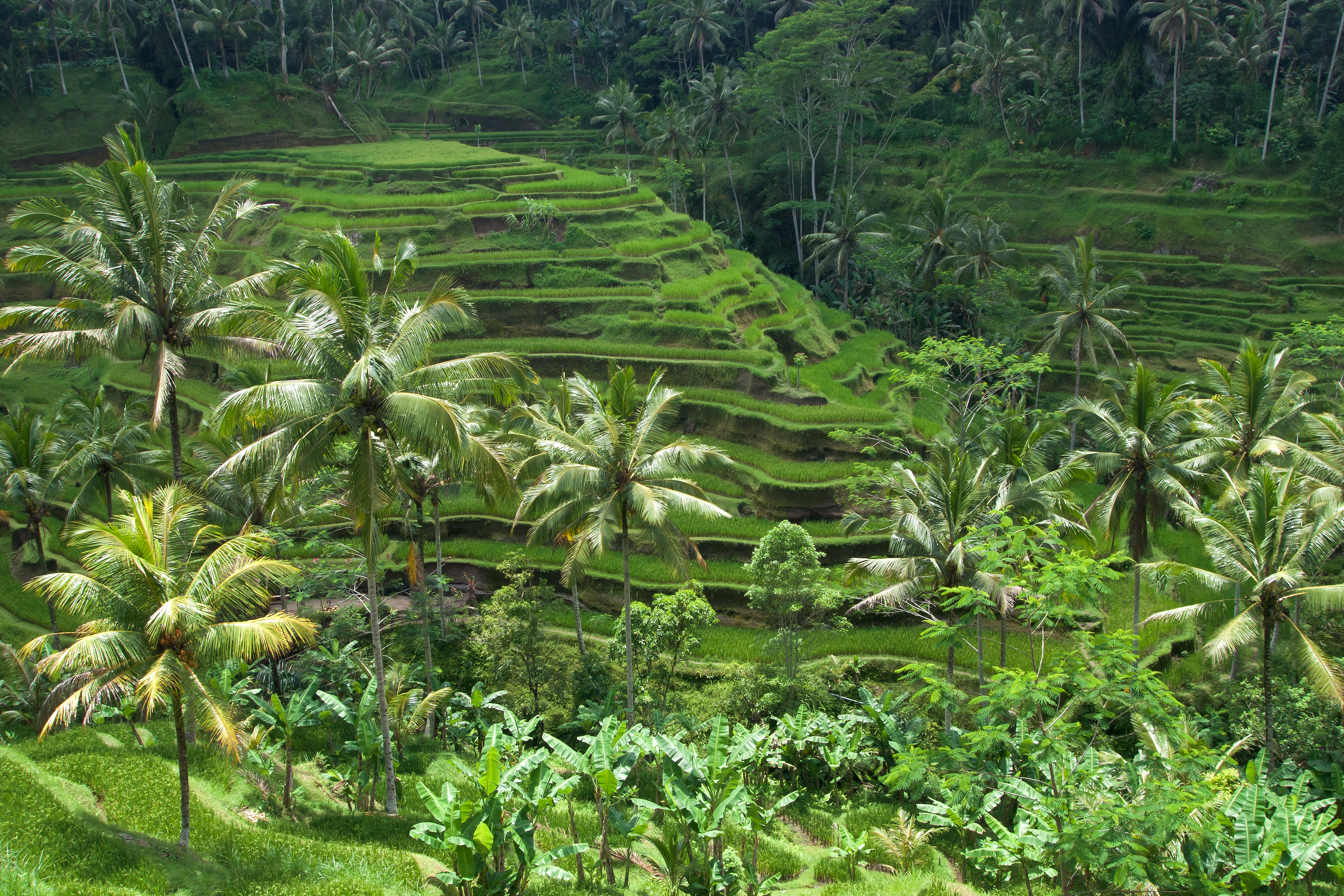
Rice terraces in Bali

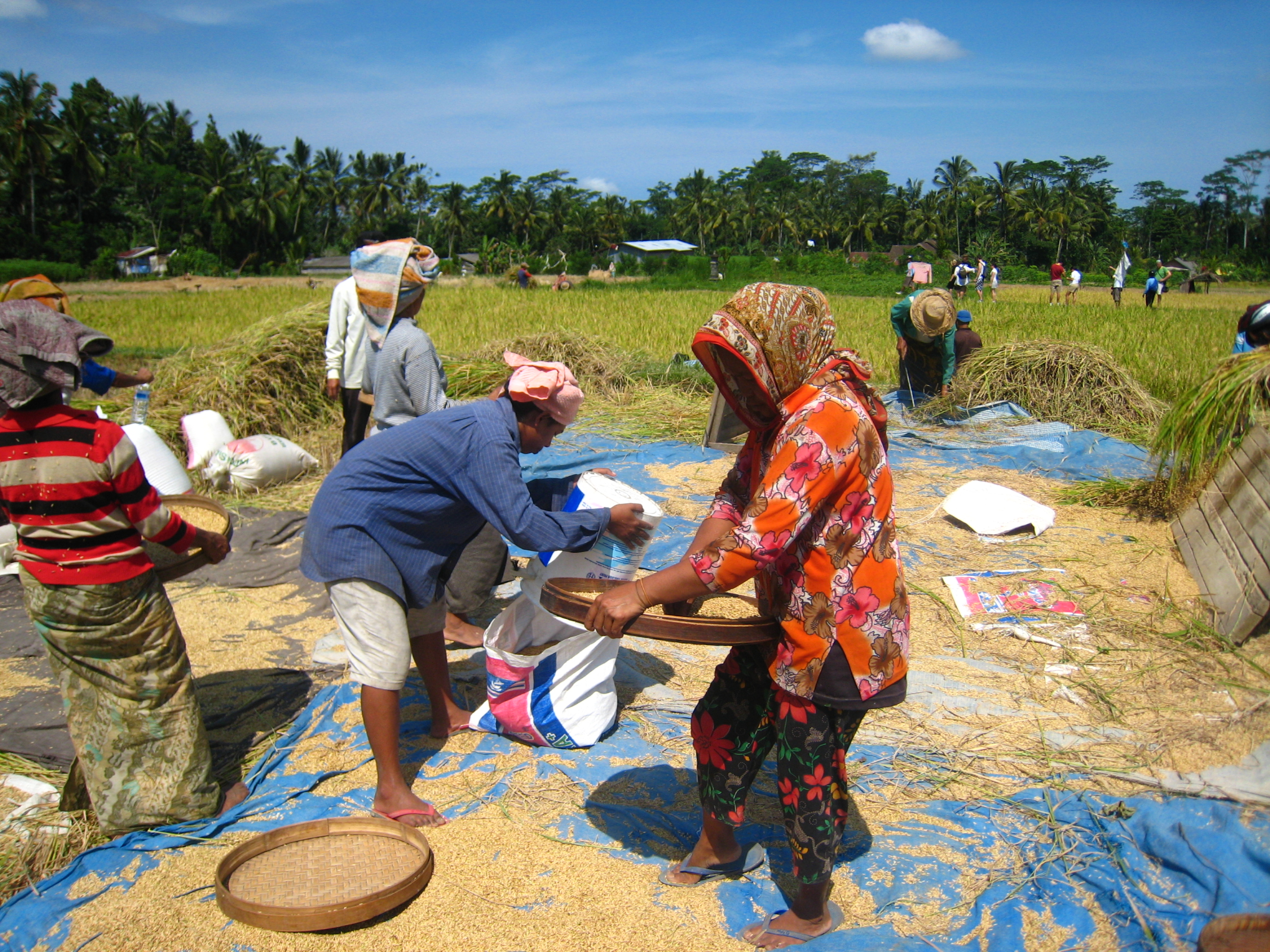
Rice harvest in Bali

The government was intensely involved in the rice economy, both to stabilize prices for urban consumers and to expand domestic output to achieve national self-sufficiency in rice production. Various governmental policies included the dissemination of high-yield seed varieties through government-sponsored extension programs, direct investment in irrigation facilities, and control of the domestic price of rice through the National Logistical Supply Organization (Bulog), the government rice-trading monopoly. In the 1970s, Indonesia was a major rice importer, but by 1985 self-sufficiency had been achieved after six years of annual growth rates in excess of 7 percent per year. From 1968 to 1989, annual rice production had increased from 12 million to over 40 million tons, and yields had increased from 2.14 tons of padi (wet rice growing) per hectare to 4.23 tons per hectare.

The most significant factor in this impressive increase in output and productivity was the spread of high-yield rice varieties. By the mid-1980s, 85 percent of rice farmers used high-yielding variety seeds, compared with 50 percent in 1975. High-yield varieties were promoted together with subsidized fertilizer, pesticides, and credit through the "mass guidance" or Bimas rice intensification program. This extension program also offered technical assistance to farmers unfamiliar with the new cultivation techniques. The new technology was not without its own problems, however. Several major infestations of the brown planthopper, whose natural predators were eliminated by the heavy use of subsidized pesticides, led to a new strategy in 1988 to apply the techniques of integrated pest management, relying on a variety of methods to limit pesticide use for control insects, plant diseases and rodents. To help reduce pesticide use, subsidies on pesticides were eliminated in 1989.

Government investments in irrigation had also made a significant contribution to increased rice production in Indonesia. From FY 1969 to FY 1989, 2.5 million hectares of existing irrigated land were rehabilitated, and irrigation was expanded to cover about 1.2 million hectares.

Because the government objective of price stability for urban consumers could potentially undermine efforts to increase production by reducing the profitability of the rice crop, Bulog's operations evolved to take into consideration producer incentives as well as consumer costs. Domestic rice prices were permitted to rise gradually during the 1970s, although they were generally held below world rice prices. However, domestic prices were kept above world prices in several periods during the 1980s. Bulog influenced the domestic rice price by operating a buffer stock on the order of 2 million tons during the 1980s. When domestic prices fell, Bulog purchased rice through village cooperatives, and when prices rose above the price ceiling, Bulog released buffer supplies. The margin between the producer floor price and urban ceiling price was sufficient to permit private traders to operate profitably, and Bulog's distribution of rice was limited to under 15 percent of total rice consumed domestically in a given year.

== See also ==
- Mega Rice Project
