= Agriculture in Timor-Leste =

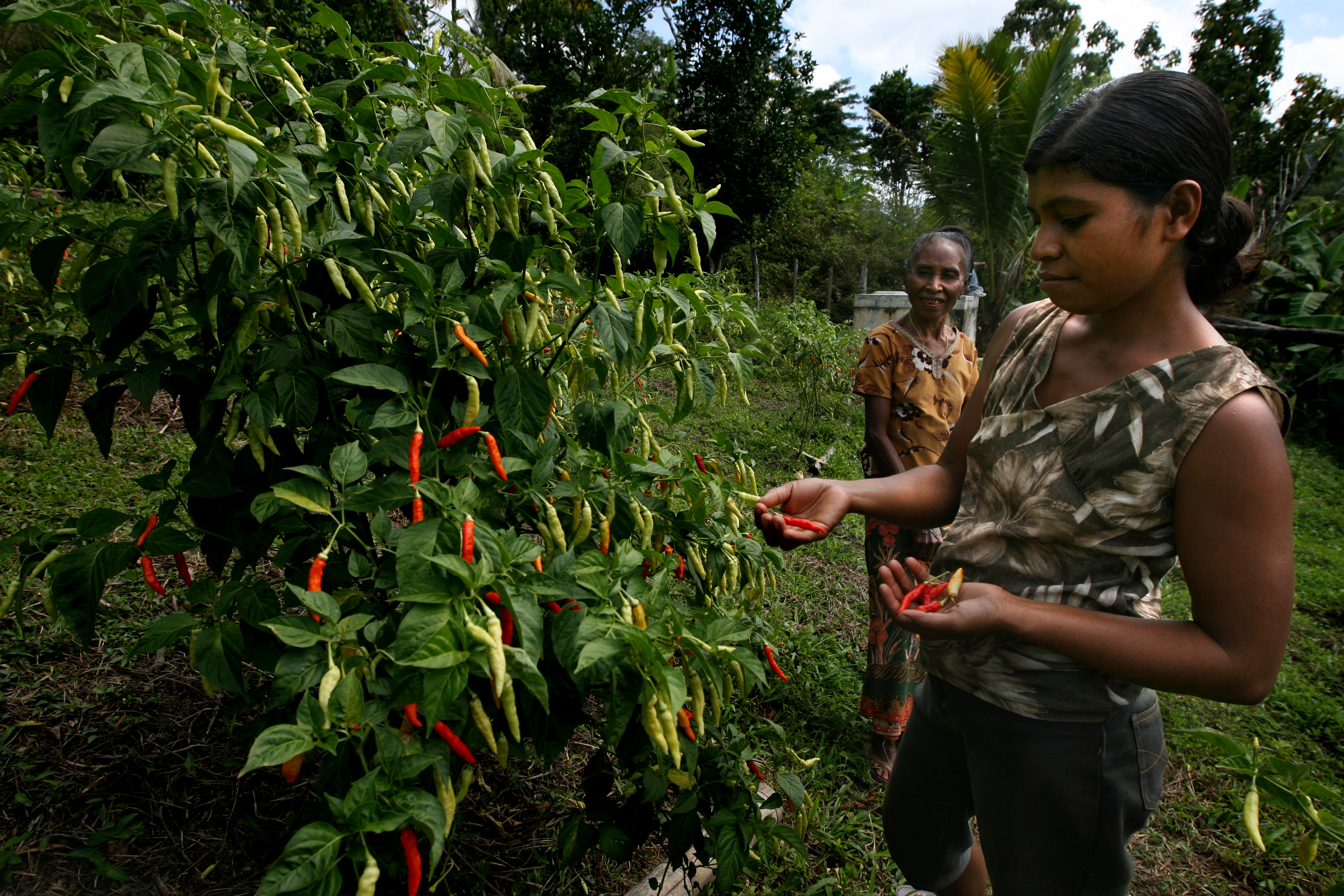
A chilli harvest in Timor-Leste.

Agriculture is a vital and crucial part of the economy of Timor-Leste. In 2016, it employed 80% of people in Timor-Leste. The main harvesting exports are coffee, rice, maize, coconuts, cassava, soybeans, cinnamon, bananas, mangoes, and sweet potatoes. Coffee is the second largest export of the whole country, only after petroleum. East Timor's economy depends on these exports.

== History ==
Before the era of colonialism in the country, grains had no significant presence in the island. Nowadays, Timor-Leste's economy depends on it.

=== Maize ===
One of the first crops to be introduced to Timor-Leste was maize. It is difficult to know the origins of the crop, as it is uncertain whether the Dutch or the Portuguese were responsible. It is possible that Portuguese colonials mistook sorghum with corn.

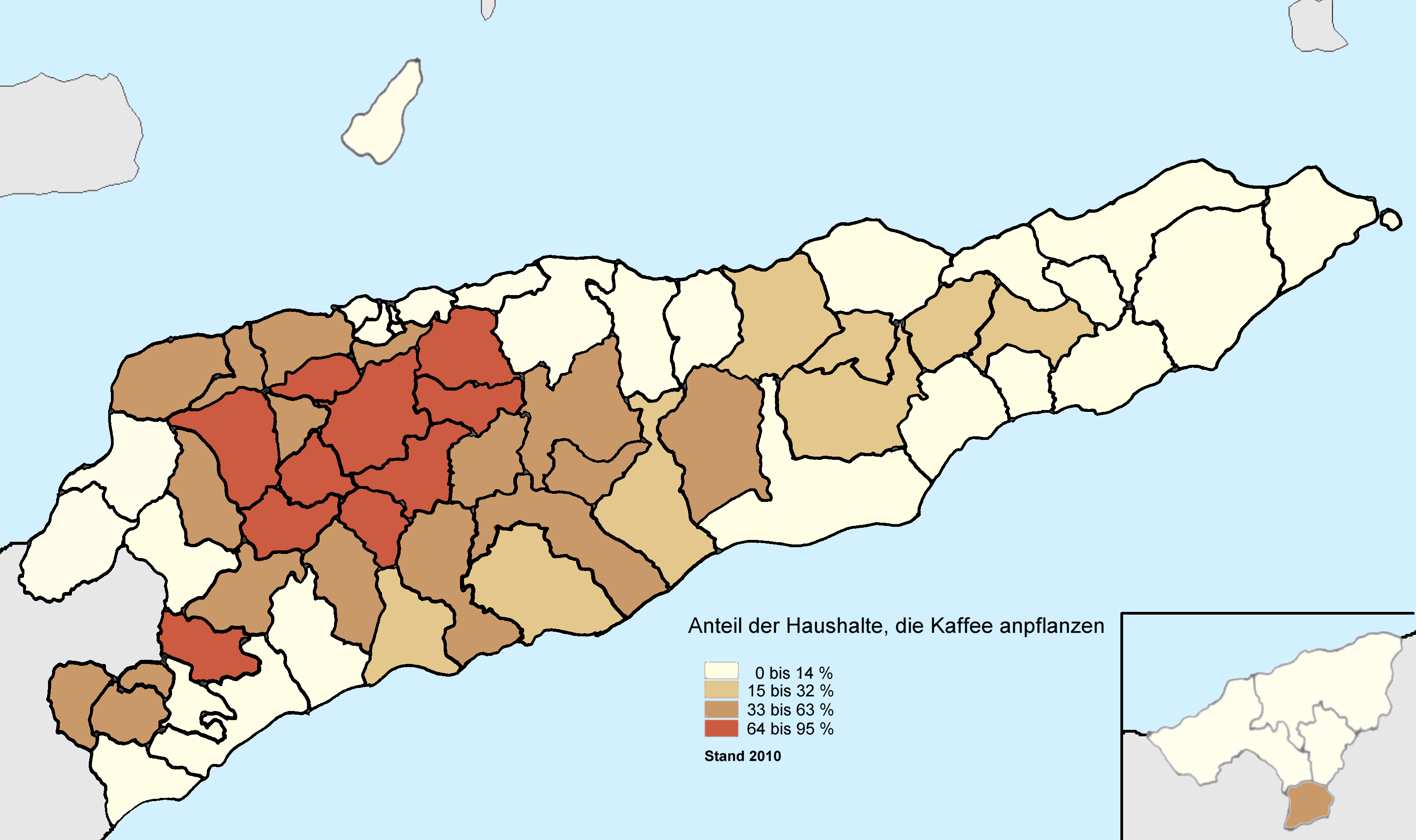
Map showing coffee production in East Timor. The redder the province, the more households grow coffee.

=== Coffee ===
Coffee, nowadays the most important East Timor crop, was introduced by the Dutch Empire in 1815 at Maubara, quickly spreading to the whole country. The profitability of the plant only increased in 1860, due to the decrease of sandalwood exports.

Afonso de Castro, governor of the colony at the time, put forth plans to increase cultivation of coffee. These plans largely copied the system of the Dutch East Indies. However, military control of East Timor was too weak to implement a similar system. In Java, cultivators were giving two-fifths as tax for the Portuguese, something that de Castro didn't succeed. The exports of coffee augmented 123 tons with the program.

=== Rice ===
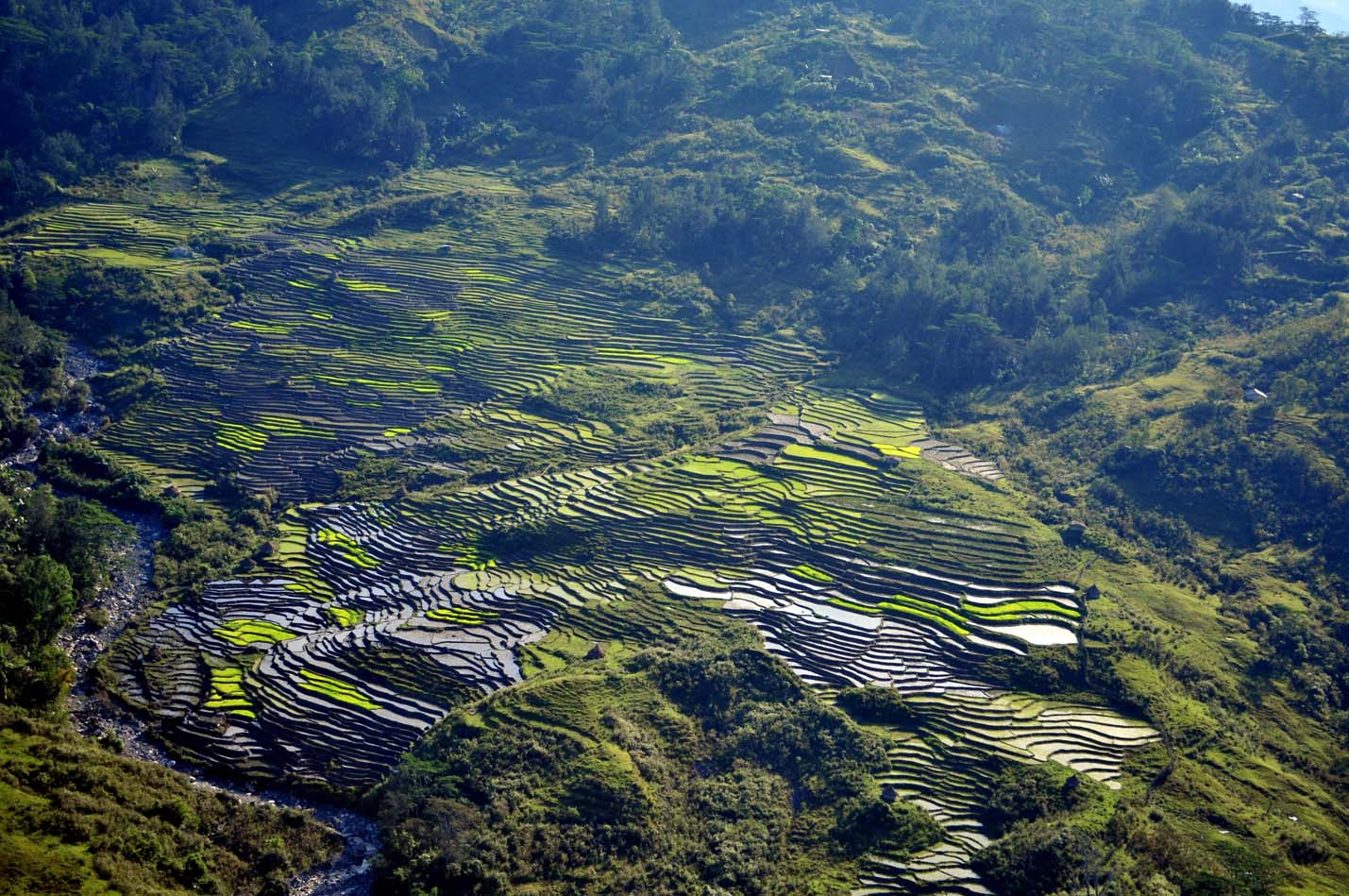
Rice cultivation in Dili.

Rice was already present before European occupation, but wasn't widespread. It did not gain traction as a food or cash crop, during the Portuguese era. This is something unusual, as in other Portuguese colonies, such as Java, rice was cultivated.

In the 19th century and the start of the 20th century, rice was rarely grown, making it exclusive to some areas. It was cultivated as a rainfed crop. Rice only begun as a profitable plant in the late 20th century, when a Portuguese bill promoted rice as a cash and food crop.

== Economic importance ==
Of the working East Timor population, approximately 70% are working in agriculture. Agriculture makes up 25.4% of the country's gross domestic product, with its main exports being coffee, rice, maize, coconuts, cassava, soybeans, cinnamon, bananas, mangoes, and sweet potatoes. It is the biggest economic driver of Timor-Leste, and main source of income for the majority of the population. Many Timorese farmers don't have access to high-quality farming equipment and knowledge of large crop production methods, meaning the to low yields and poor-quality crops.

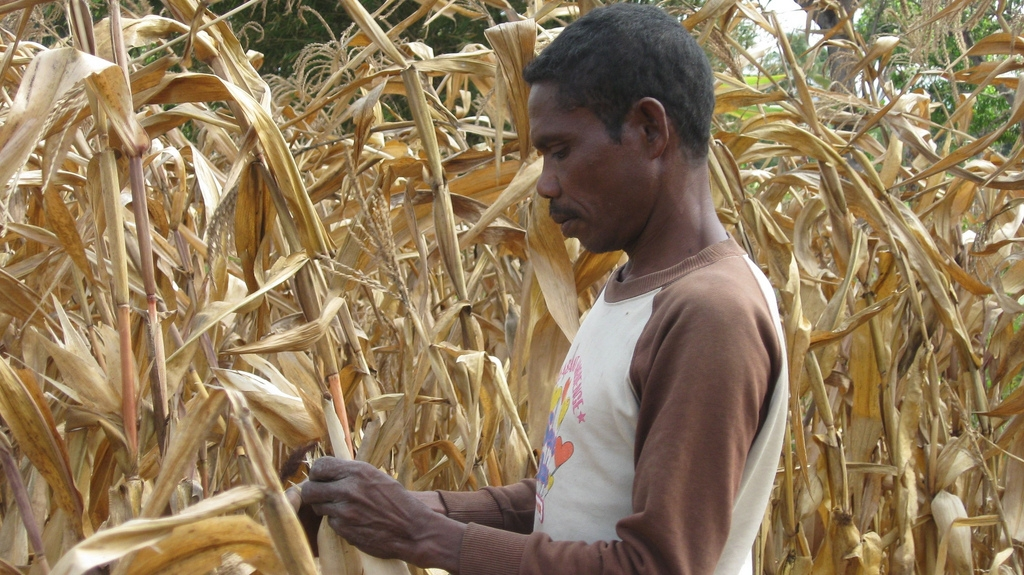
Man harvesting genetically modified maize as part of the Seeds of Life program.

=== Seeds of Life program ===
The Seeds of Life program was an initiative of the Australian government to increase food security in Timor-Leste that started in 2000 and ended in 2016. It introduced new varieties of rice, maize, peanut, sweet potato, mung bean, climbing bean and cassava.

Crop yield of maize increased 50%, peanut 54%, cassava 40%, rice 24% and sweet potato 130%.

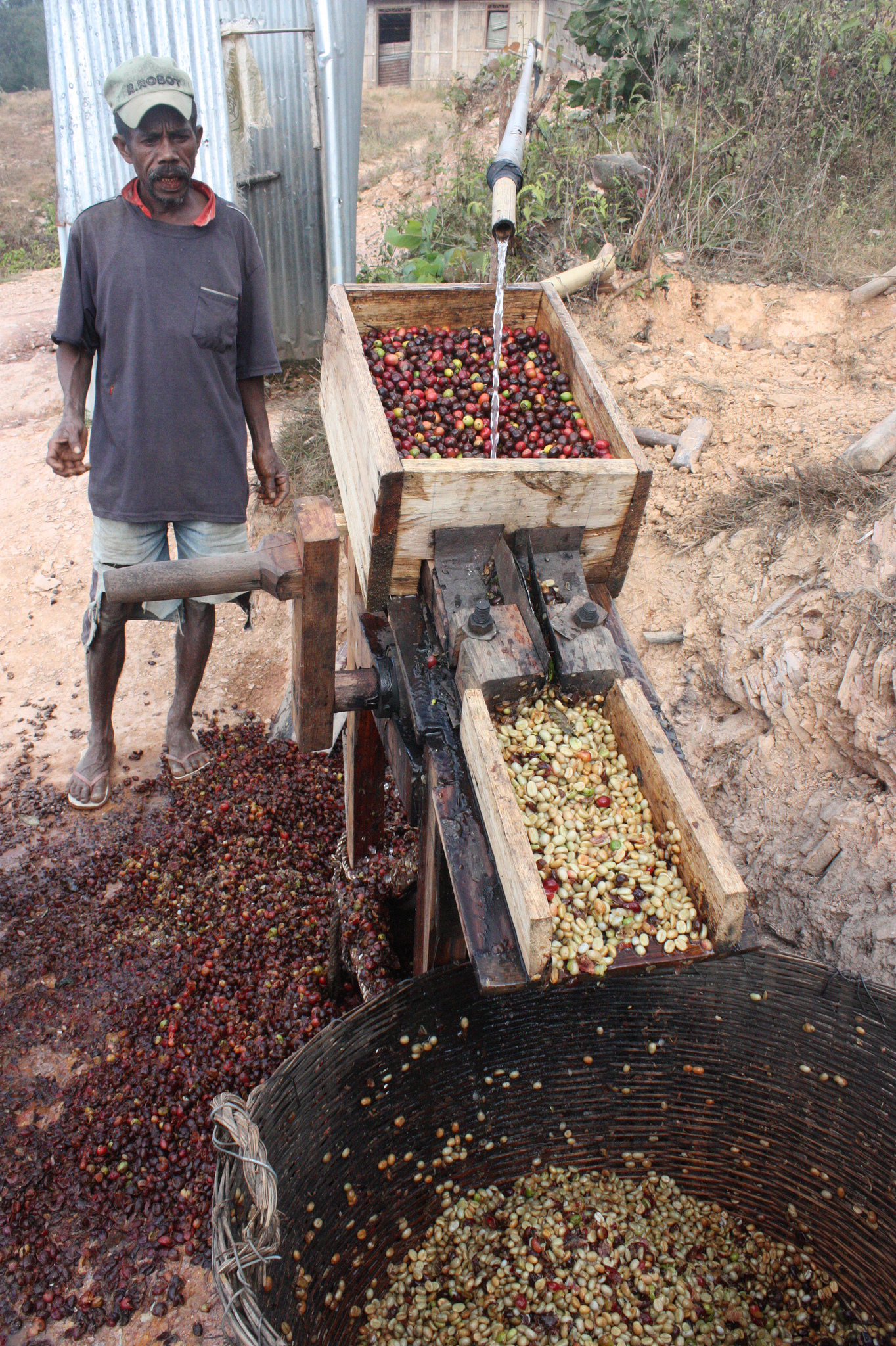
Coffee being processed at Ermera District.

== Coffee ==
Coffee is the largest non-oil export of Timor-Leste (East Timor). Since the introduction of coffee by the Portuguese in the 1800s, the industry contributes a sizeable portion of the country's employment and investment and is a major source of income for rural communities. The industry is vulnerable to global coffee price fluctuation, deficient infrastructure, and lack of capital.
