= Fort Willem I, Ambarawa =

Fort in Ambarawa, Java, Indonesia

Coordinates: 7.270886°S 110.410191°E

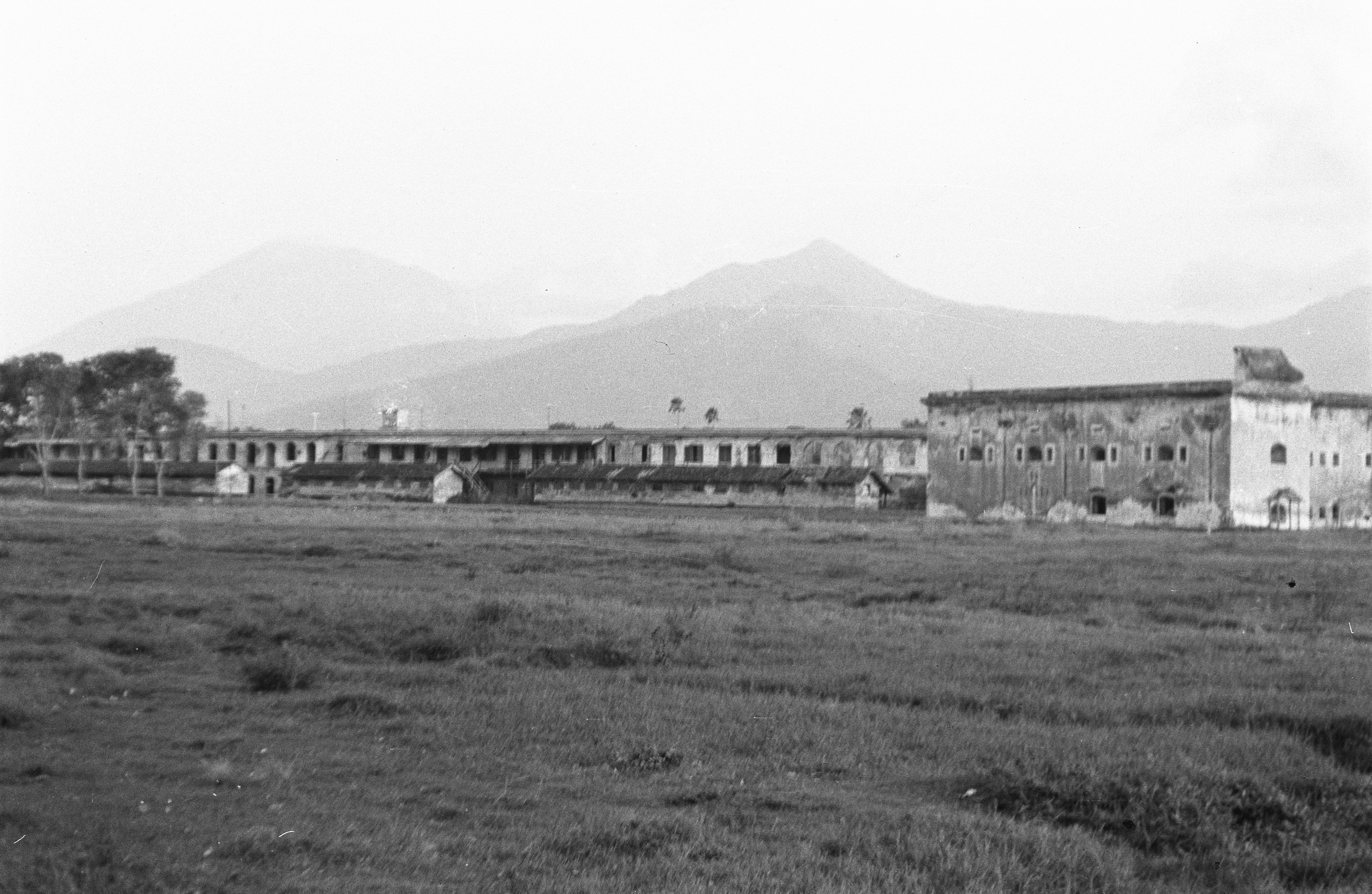
A view of the fort during the colonial era

Fort Willem I, known in Indonesian/Javanese as Benteng Pendem Ambarawa (Ambarawa's Sunken Fort), is a 19th-century Dutch fortress in Ambarawa, Central Java, Indonesia.

== History ==
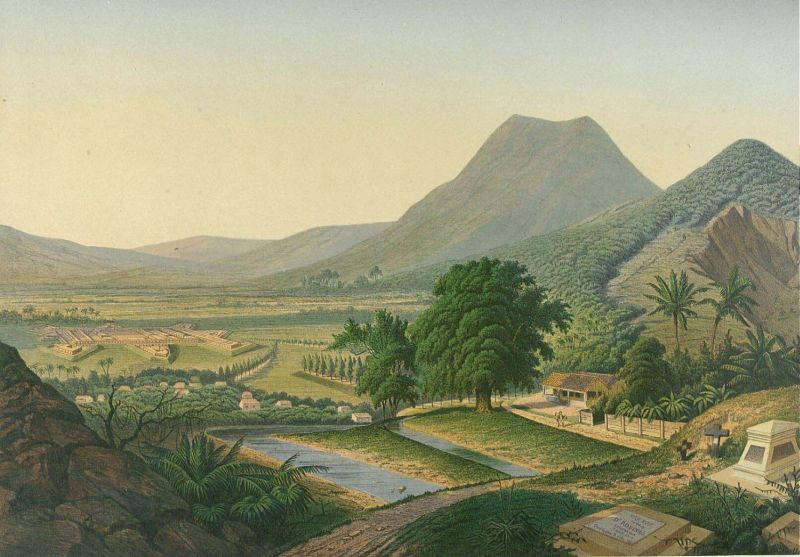
A 19th-century lithograph showing the fertile Ambarawa plantation with European cemetery in the foreground and the extensive square-shaped Fort Willem I in the background

During the Diponegoro War (1827-1830), Colonel Hoorn, Commander of the 2nd Division, assigned to the crossroads at Bawen, instructed the construction of a logistical supply point, as well several military barracks, to give immediate supply and forces for the war, as Bawen is a vital junction connecting the cities of Semarang, Yogyakarta, Salatiga and Surakarta. As a result, several sheds, made out of bamboo, were built at this strategic point during the war.

After the war, during the reign of Willem II, a fort was constructed in Ambarawa between 1834 and 1853. In 1840, Ambarawa had become a strategic military outpost, serving as a choke point between Semarang and Surakarta. The Dutch had also established several military defense points along this route. Their purpose was to establish a relationship with the Sultanate of Mataram and to prevent native troop movements.

From 1853 to 1927 KNIL military barracks were set up in the fort. The private Dutch East Indies Railway Company (NIS) received concession in 1862 to build a rail track connecting Semarang, Surakarta, Magelang and Yogyakarta with a branch toward Fort Willem I. Construction started in 1863 and was completed in 1873. An earthquake occurring on July 16, 1865, damaged some buildings inside the fort. In 1927, Fort Willem I changed its function from a juvenile penitentiary into an adult and political prison.

During the period of Japanese occupation, Fort Willem I was converted into an internment camp.

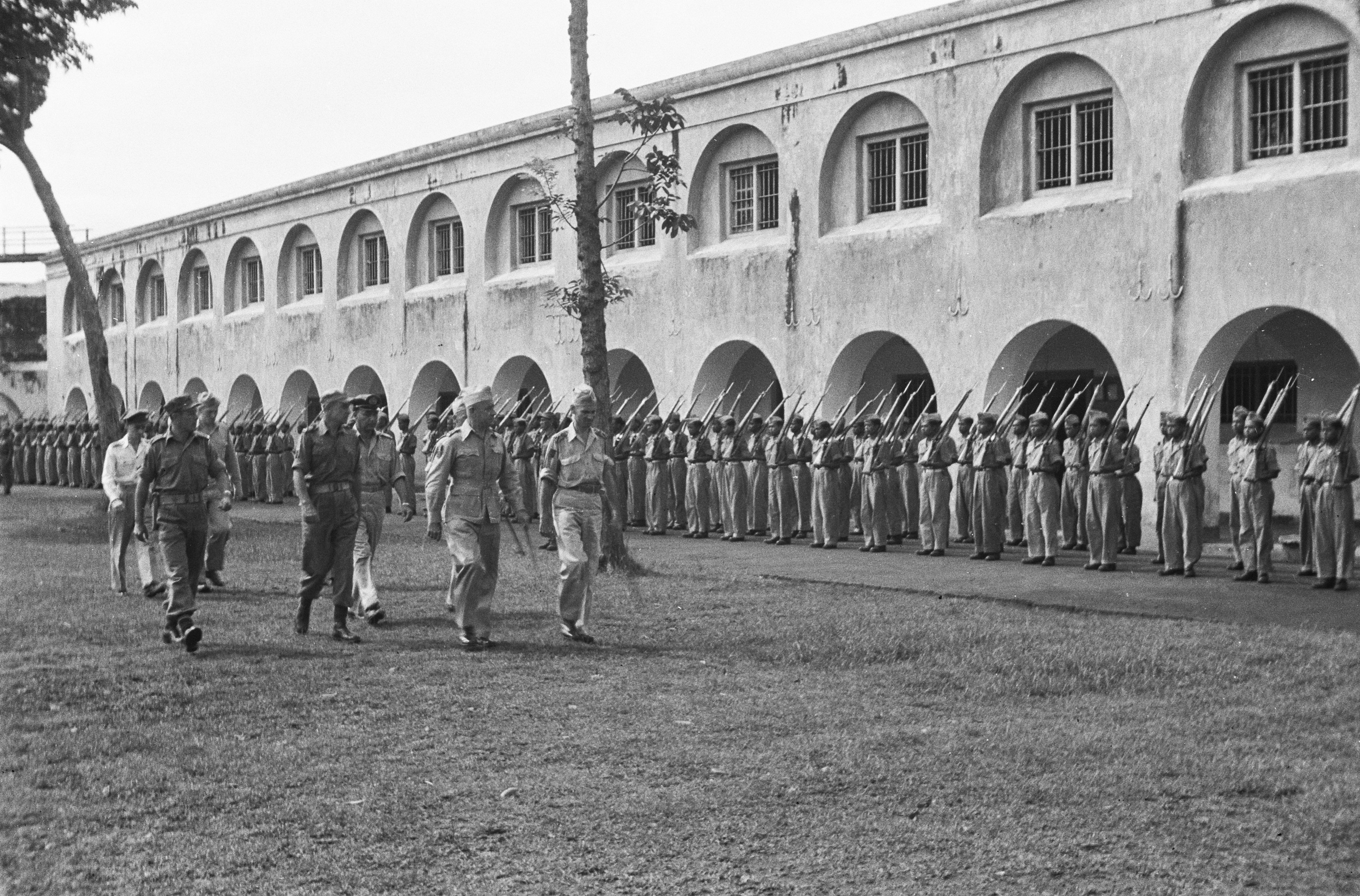
Newly-trained police troops line up for a passing-out parade, 1948

After the Indonesian declaration of independence, from October 14, 1945, to November 23, 1945, parts of the fort were also used as a military base by the Tentara Keamanan Rakjat ('People's Security Army'), a predecessor of the Indonesian National Army. During which time, around 3,500 Dutch civilians were interned by Indonesian freedom fighters inside the Fort Willem I; the internment camp used former prisoners and guards for camp security.

In 1950, parts of the fort were converted into an adult penitentiary. In 1985, it was repurposed yet again as a juvenile penitentiary facility; in 1991, penitentiary class IIB; in 2003 and until now, penitentiary class IIA.

== Structure ==
Fort Willem I is situated in the middle of a rice field. The main building is a pentagonal fort, sized around 178 m × 178 m (580 ft × 580 ft). Small storage buildings are located around 94 meter away from the fort at each cardinal points.

Unlike earlier 18th-century fort designs, the 19th-century Willem I Fort were designed for a mainly defensive and logistical purpose. As such, the fort contains no embrasures or bastions. Instead, there are many windows in the rampart, and the bastions are detached from the fort.
