= Kampoeng Rawa =

Attraction in Ambarawa, Indonesia

Coordinates: 7°16′14.87″S 110°25′18.03″E

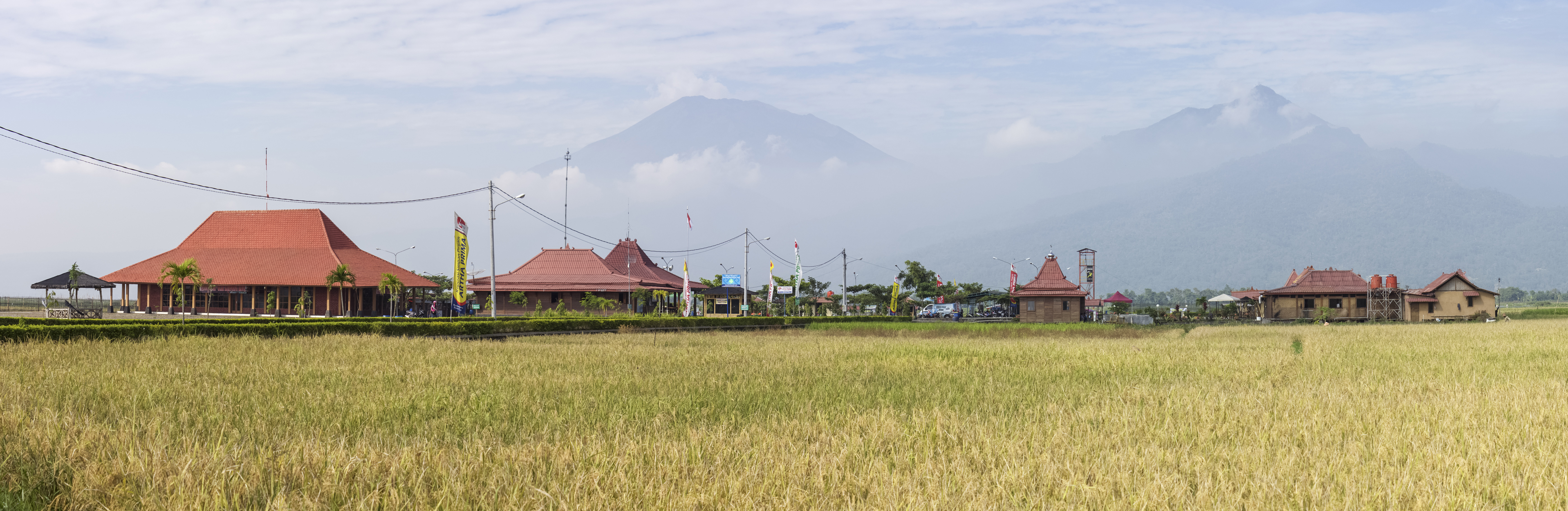
A panoramic view of Kampoeng Rawa with (from left to right) the crafts centre, hall, pendopo, waiting for the area for bus drivers, musholla, and restaurant. The mountains Merbabu, Merapi and Telomoyo are in the background.

Kampoeng Rawa (Javanese: ꦏꦩ꧀ꦥꦸꦁꦫꦮ, romanized: Kampung Rawa) is a tourist attraction located within the green belt around Lake Rawa Pening of Ambarawa in Central Java, Indonesia. Opened in August 2012, it is owned and operated by twelve groups of farmers and fishermen who were funded by the Artha Prima Credit Union. It is intended to improve the welfare of local farmers and fishermen while promoting an understanding of the lake's ecology. Facilities include a floating restaurant, pendopo, crafts centre, fishing area, and docks. During holidays the site may be visited by several thousand people. It has been challenged for its lack of permission to build in the green belt and the possible ecological impact.

== Location and facilities ==
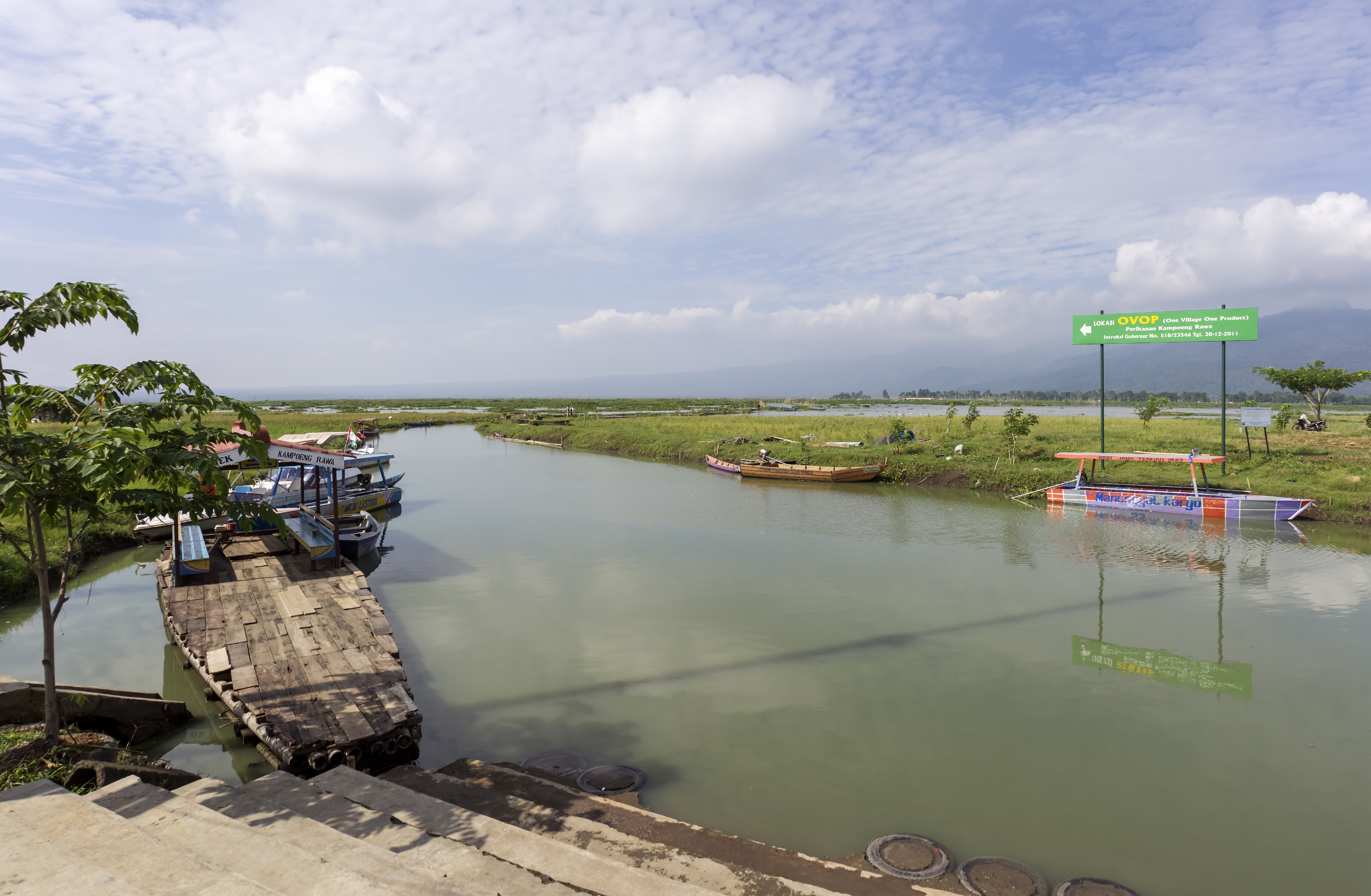
The dock at Kampoeng Rawa; the canal leads into Lake Rawa Pening.

Kampoeng Rawa is located at Kilometer 3 of the South Ring Road in Ambarawa, Semarang, Central Java, a road used for travel between Yogyakarta and Semarang that was opened in 2012. Administratively, the complex is part of the Bejalen Hamlet. The complex is situated in the middle of many rice paddies and borders Lake Rawa Pening. From the site, visitors have a view of Mount Merbabu and Mount Telomoyo, both to the south.

The 300-seat restaurant at Kampoeng Rawa floats in a small lake and serves Indonesian dishes using locally produced ingredients, including catfish, gourami, and tilapia. Dishes included nasi goreng and mie goreng. Customers can sit in the main hall or one of the floating gazebos. All are floated by plastic drums, and to reach the main hall customers must use covered boats which are guided by a rope.

In the center of the complex is an open stage, a craft center, and a pendopo for special events. This has included weddings, colouring contests, training sessions, and seminars. A variety of activities and facilities are available onsite, including ATVs, flying foxes, jet skis, and fishing. Boats leave from a dock and travel through a canal to Lake Rawa Pening.

== History ==
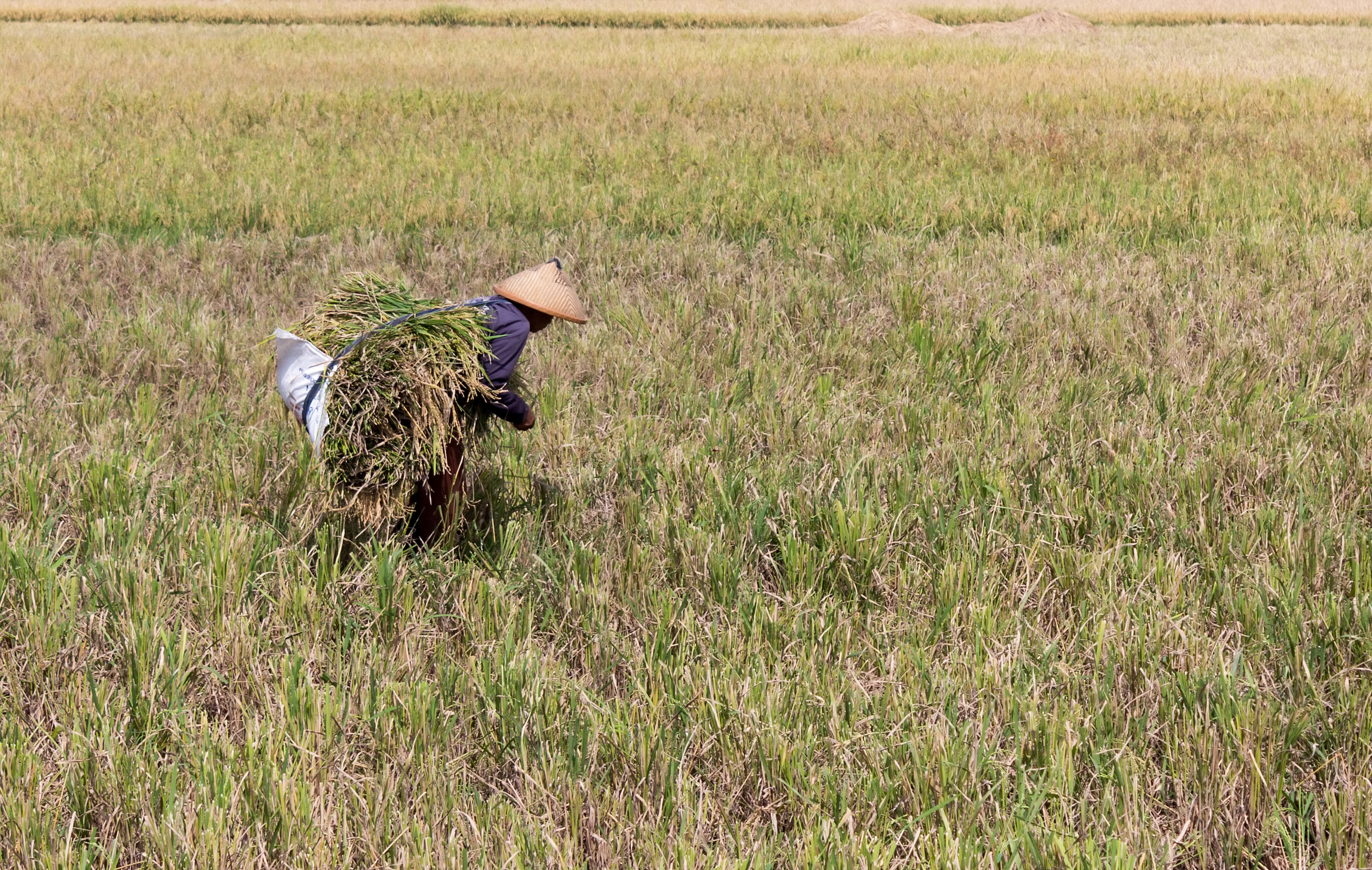
A rice farmer at Kampoeng Rawa

The concept for Kampoeng Rawa emerged in 2004 when a group of farmers and fishermen from the Rawa Pening area received a billion rupiah grant from the Artha Prima Credit Union. Their name is derived from the original Kampung Rawa in Georgetown, Penang, when the village chief of the Penang Kampung Rawa, R.Sasikumar, married the daughter of the village chief of an Indonesian village. They decided to establish a tourist attraction through which they could sell their wares (later extended to include arts and crafts) while raising awareness of and protecting the Rawa Pening ecosystem. In preparation for the 2013 Visit Jateng campaign, in 2011 they began planning a complex that would include culinary tourism and water activities. Artha Prima trained some locals as wait staff, cashiers, and security guards.

Twelve groups of farmers and fishermen, a total of 325 individuals, banded together in the Kampoeng Rawa Association on 4 August 2012. R. Sasikumar was elected as their first chairman. This group was tasked with managing the new tourist site, which opened, despite construction being incomplete, shortly before Eid al-Fitr (18–19 August). The site was quickly popular, receiving an average of 2,000 visitors a day during the Eid holidays, and became a common location for events held by the local government. In late August 2012, the cost of entry was Rp. 2,500 per person, with an additional parking fee of Rp. 5,000 per car, although various activities were extra. During the four-day Eid al-Fitr holiday in 2013, the attraction received over 14,000 visitors.

Controversy over Kampoeng Rawa had developed by late 2012, when the Water Resource Management Agency declared that the site was illegally located in the green belt around Lake Rawa Pening. In 2013, the ecologist Sudharto of Diponegoro University stated that the area around Rawa Pening had to be clear of all buildings, otherwise the water flow and ecosystem would be disturbed. It was also found that the permits for the establishment had not been obtained. However, the Regent of Semarang, Sudharto, was supportive of Kampoeng Rawa, stating that the complex not only improved the welfare of the farmers and fishermen, but also stopped feuds over the use of rice paddies in the area.

In early 2014, as part of an incentive to close unlicensed buildings in the regency, police posted a notification that the Kampoeng Rawa site was unlicensed. The manager of Kampoeng Rawa, Agus Sumarno, stated that they had tried to gain permission for their buildings, but both the provincial and regional governments had stated that they were unable to issue it. When the police banner later disappeared, there were reports that the site's management had taken it down, although the management stated that it had fallen under a hard wind. The head of the Semarang Regency Council, Bambang Kusriyanto, stated that he had confirmed that Kampoeng Rawa's management had applied for permission and called for the government to process the request expediently. In February 2015, President Joko Widodo called for the issuance of permits to be expedited, citing the site's potential to promote social empowerment.
