= Simon Sanches =

Dutch navy nurse and laboratory technician

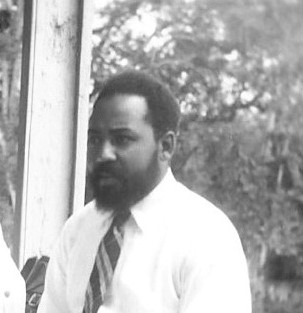
- Sanches (1948)
- Born: Simon Everhardus Hendrik Sanches; 9 August 1915; Ambarawa, Java, Dutch East Indies (nowadays Indonesia)
- Died: 16 August 2002 (aged 87); Leiderdorp, Netherlands
- Occupation(s): navy nurse, laboratory technician

Simon Everhardus Hendrik Sanches (9 August 1915 – 16 August 2002) was a Dutch navy nurse and laboratory technician who planned to commit a coup d'état in Suriname on the night of 7 to 8 November 1947. The coup was betrayed, and he was sentenced to seven months imprisonment and was later pardoned.

== Biography ==
Sanches was born on 9 August 1915 in Ambarawa, Java, Dutch East Indies (nowadays Indonesia). He spent his youth in Suriname, and moved to the Netherlands in 1934 to study medicine. He ran into financial difficulties, and joined the Royal Netherlands Navy in 1940 as a nurse.

Sanches' navy career was cut short by the German invasion of the Netherlands, and he studied to become a medical laboratory technician in Utrecht. During this period, he became politically active. He met several Surinamese army volunteers who were also stuck in the Netherlands, and often had difficulties making a living. After graduation, he started to work for the National Institute for Public Health.

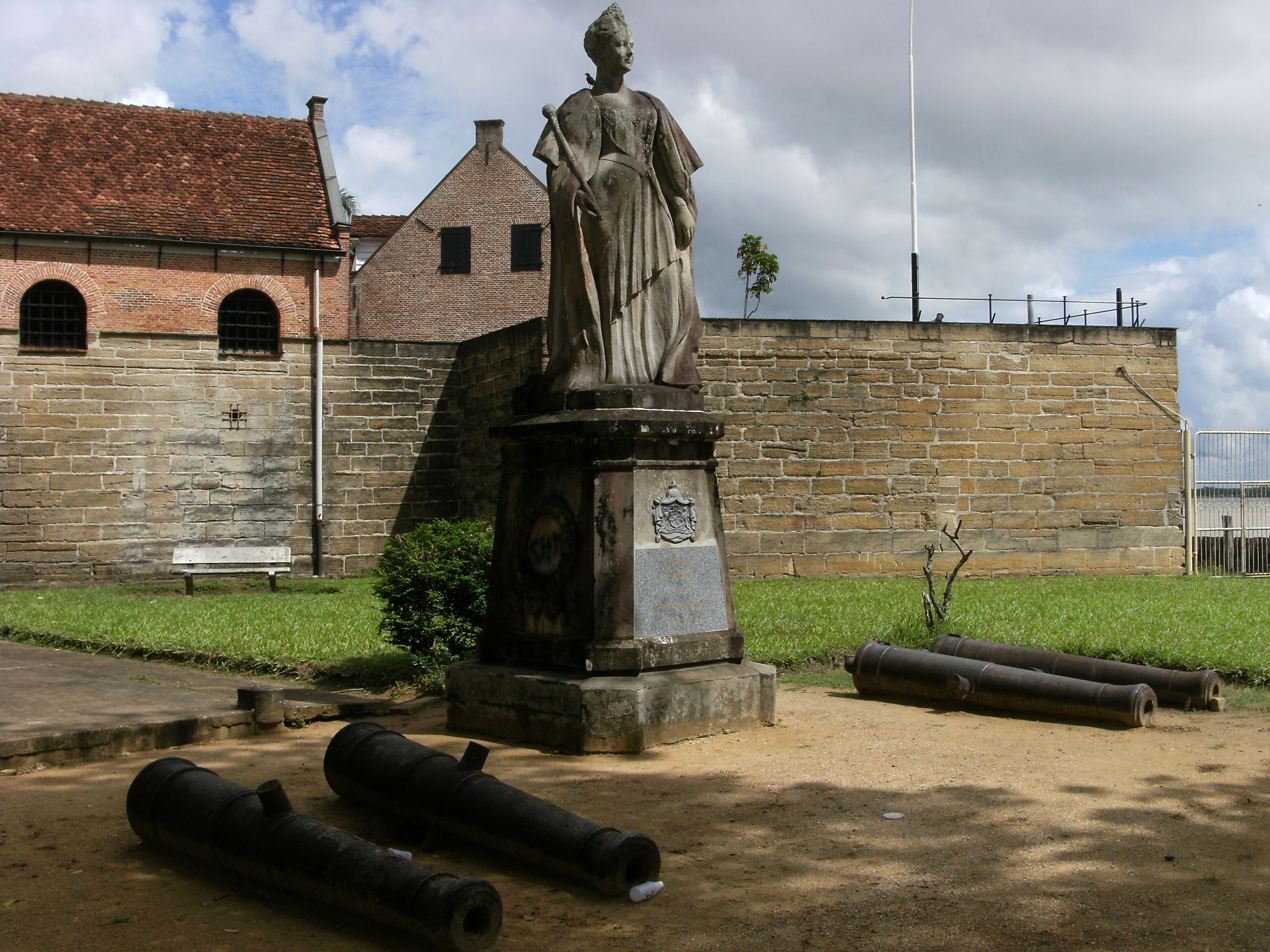
Queen Wilhelmina in Paramaribo (2008)

In 1947, Sanches decided to return to Suriname, but could not find employment. He joined up with army veterans and disgruntled serving personnel. On the night of 7 to 8 November, they had planned to capture the Memre Boekoe barracks, and use the tanks and weapons which were at the barracks, to capture the police station, the telephone station, the Gouvernor's Palace, and Fort Zeelandia. A curious detail is that Sanches wanted to replace the statue of Queen Wilhelmina with a statue of Anton de Kom.

The wife of one of the conspirators told her priest who contacted the military command. 15 people including Sanches were arrested on 6 November 1947. Soldiers stationed in Paramaribo were gathered to guard the Gouvernor's Palace. Sanches soon confessed his plan to overthrow the government. By 18 November, Sanches, five soldiers and one police officer remained in custody.

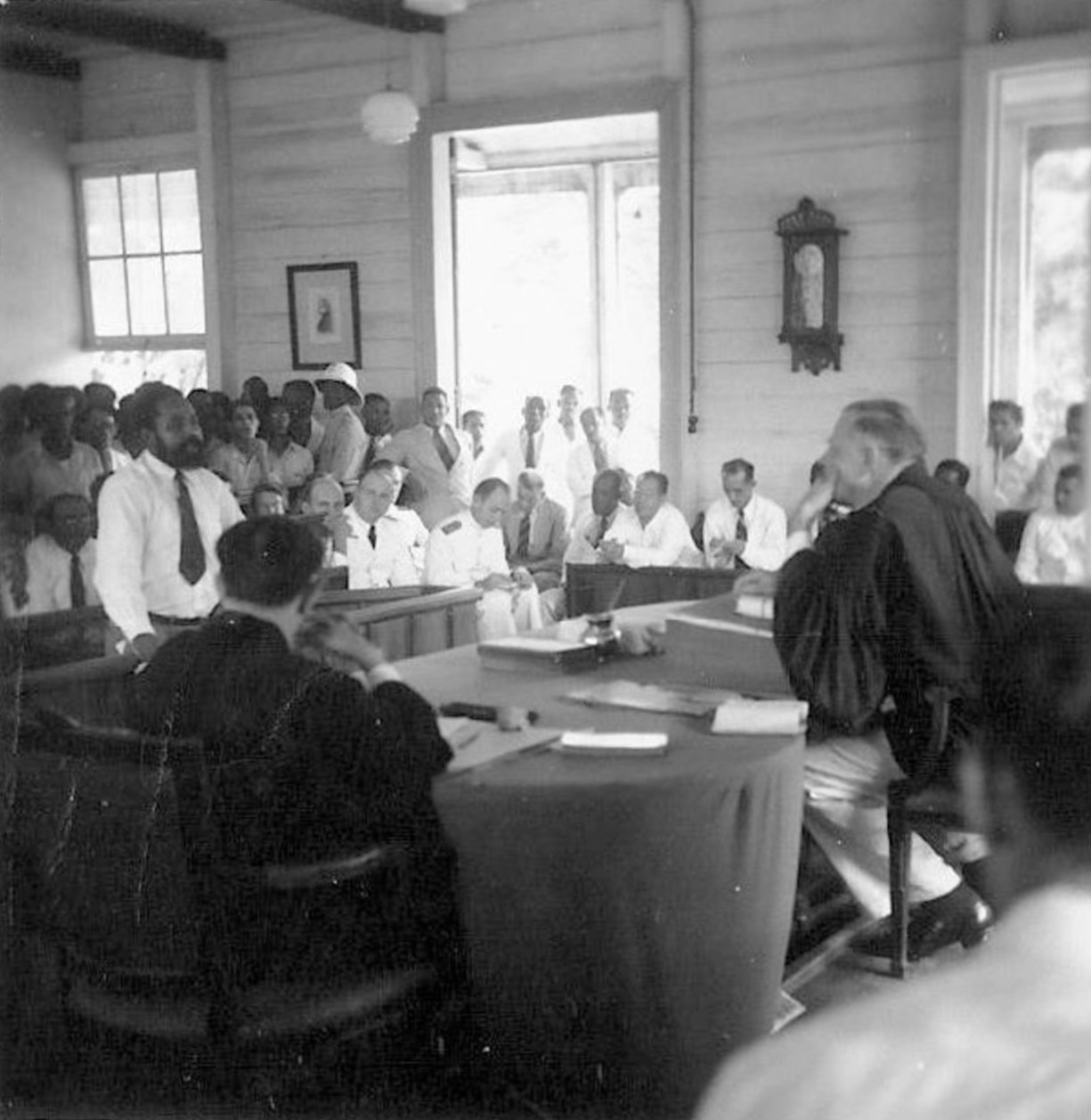
Sanches during the trial (1948)

On 16 February 1948, Sanches was convicted to seven months imprisonment by the civil court. The police officer was found not guilty. The prosecutor filed an appeal on 28 February. The soldiers were tried by court-martial on 6 March. Three conspirators were sentenced to one year and three months, two others to six months imprisonment. On 5 April, all six conspirators were pardoned by Gouvernor Brons for the main sentence, i.e. the dishonorable discharge remained for the military personnel.

Sanches moved to the Netherlands, and never returned to Suriname. He worked as a civil servant for the city of The Hague. In 1964, he moved to Leiden where he started to work at the Leiden University Medical Center as a laboratory technician. During the 1960s, Sanches was chairperson of the Leiden branch of the Pacifist Socialist Party.

Sanches died on 16 August 2002 in Leiderdorp, at the age of 87.

== See also ==
- Frans Killinger
