= Tuntang River =

River in Central Java, Indonesia

Tuntang River Sungai Tuntang, Kali Tuntang
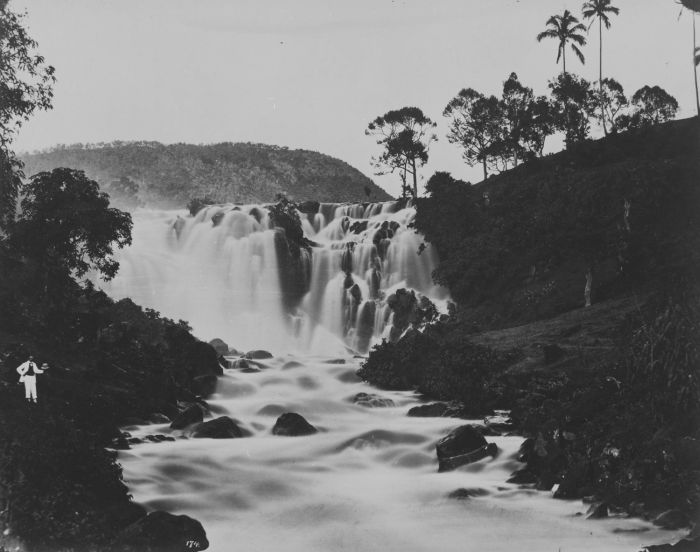
- Waterfall by the Tuntang river near Salatiga (1940)

- Location of river mouth Tuntang River (Indonesia)

Location
- Country: Indonesia
- Province: Central Java

Physical characteristics
- Source: Lake Rawa Pening
  - coordinates: 7°15′53″S 110°26′58″E
- Mouth: Java Sea
  - coordinates: 6°50′07″S 110°31′27″E

The Tuntang (Indonesian: Kali Tuntang) is a major river of northern Central Java, Indonesia, about 400 km east of the capital Jakarta. It connects Lake Rawa Pening to the Java Sea, east of Semarang. There is a hydroelectric power station on the river near the lake.

== Geography ==
The river flows in the central area of Java with a predominantly tropical monsoon climate (designated as Am in the Köppen-Geiger climate classification). The annual average temperature in the area is 21 °C. The warmest month is September when the average temperature is around 24 °C, and the coldest is June, at 20 °C. The average annual rainfall is 3140 mm. The wettest month is January, with an average of 560 mm of rainfall, and the driest is September, with 14 mm of rainfall.

== See also ==
- List of drainage basins of Indonesia
- List of rivers of Indonesia
- List of rivers of Java
