= Ambarawa =

Coordinates: 7°16′S 110°24′E

- Town
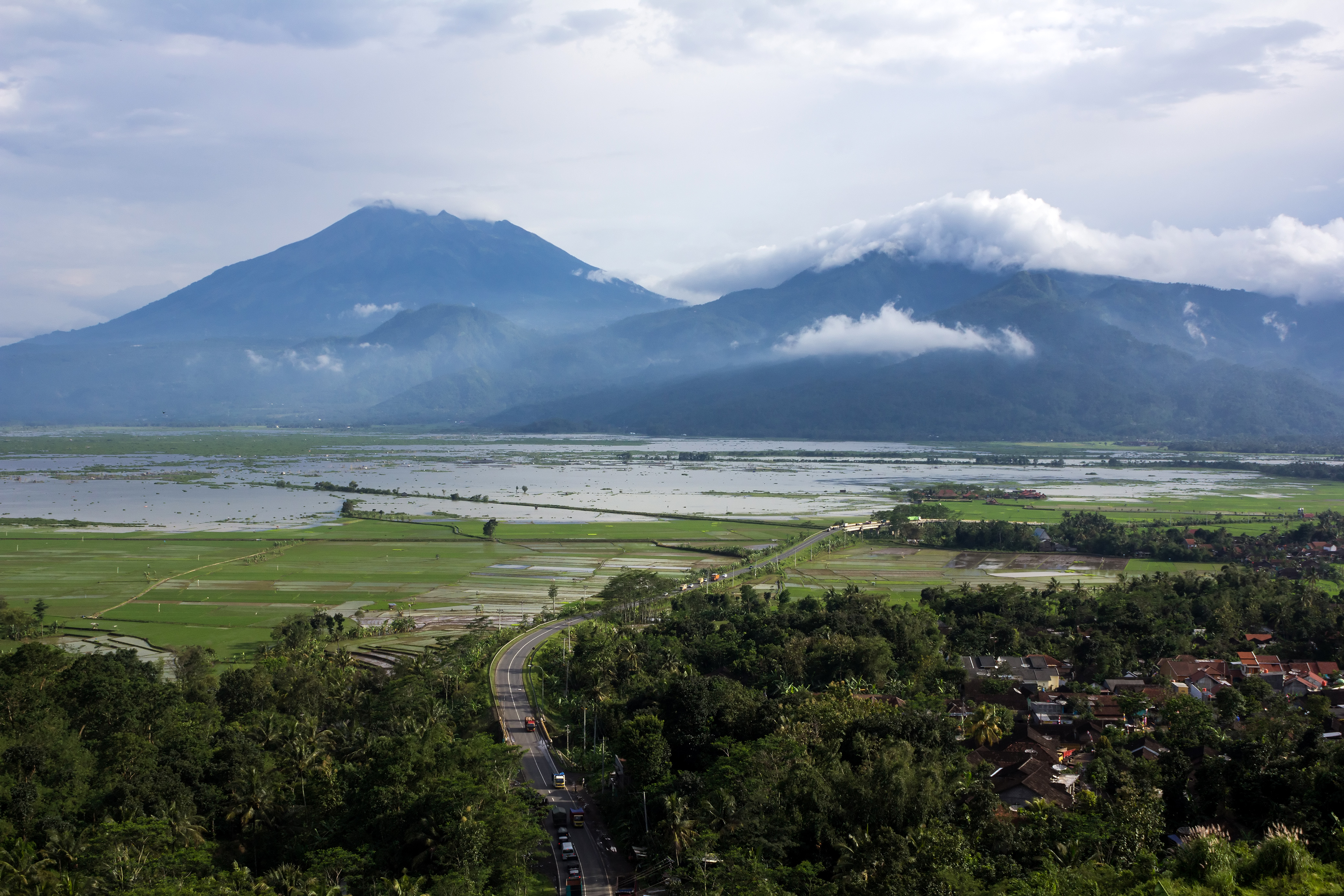
- A view of Mount Merbabu, Telomoyo and Lake Rawapening from Ambarawa.
- Nickname: Mbahrowo
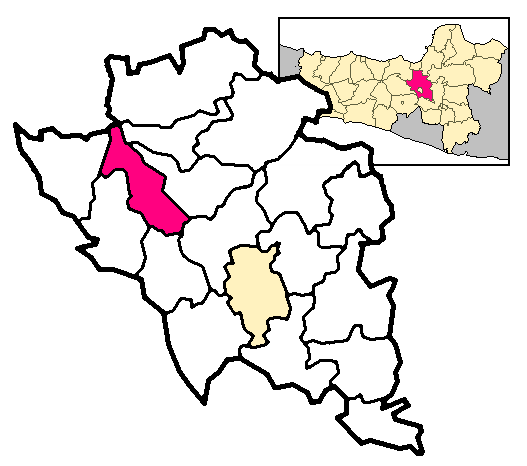
- Location within Semarang Regency
- Country: Indonesia
- Province: Central Java
- Regency: Semarang Regency

Area
  - Total: 28.22 km^{2} (10.90 sq mi)

Population (mid 2025 estimate)
  - Total: 65,402
  - Density: 2,318/km^{2} (6,002/sq mi)

Demographics
  - Ethnic groups: Javanese; Chinese; Bataks
- Time zone: UTC+7 (Indonesia Western Standard Time)
- Languages: Indonesian; Javanese

Ambarawa is a town and an administrative district (kecamatan) of the Semarang Regency, located between the cities of Semarang and Salatiga in Central Java Province of Indonesia. Administratively, it is bordered by the districts of Banyubiru to the south, Jambu to the west, Bandungan to the north, and Bawen to the east.

During colonial times, Ambarawa was an important railway hub connecting through regions in Java as far as Yogyakarta and Magelang. The Semarang-Ambarawa-Magelang line was fully operational until 1977. It is the site of the Indonesian Railway Museum (Museum Kereta Api Ambarawa), which features a section of rack railway between Ambarawa to Bedono on the former Ambarawa-Magelang mainline. The 19th-century Fort Willem I penitentiary complex and military barrack is also located in Ambarawa.

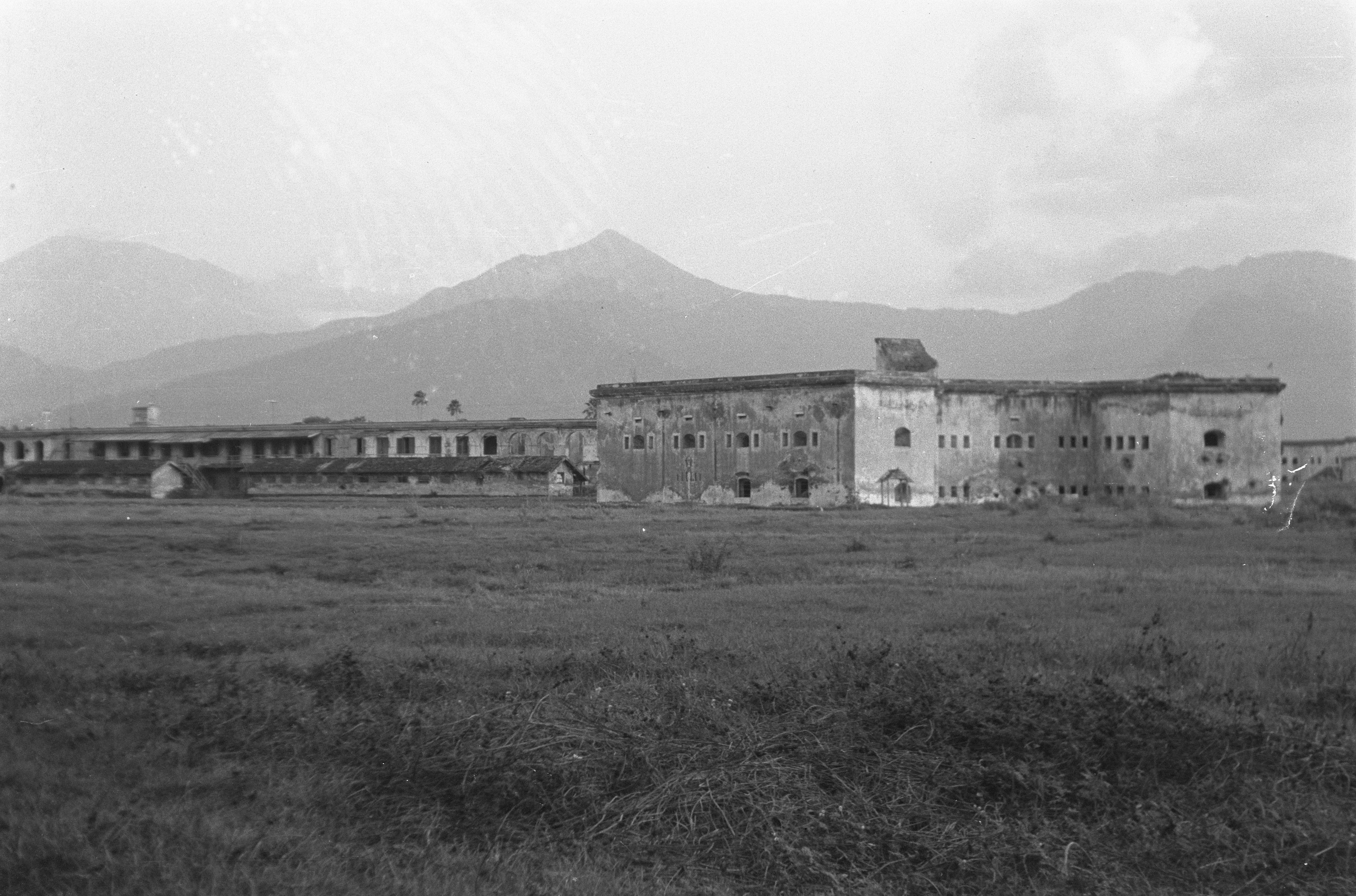
Fort Willem I

== Japanese internment camps ==
Ambarawa was the site of Japanese internment camps where up to 15,000 Europeans had been held during the Japanese occupation during World War II. Following Japanese surrender and the subsequent proclamation of Indonesian independence, fighting broke out in and around Ambarawa on 20 November 1945 between British troops evacuating European internees and Indonesian Republicans.

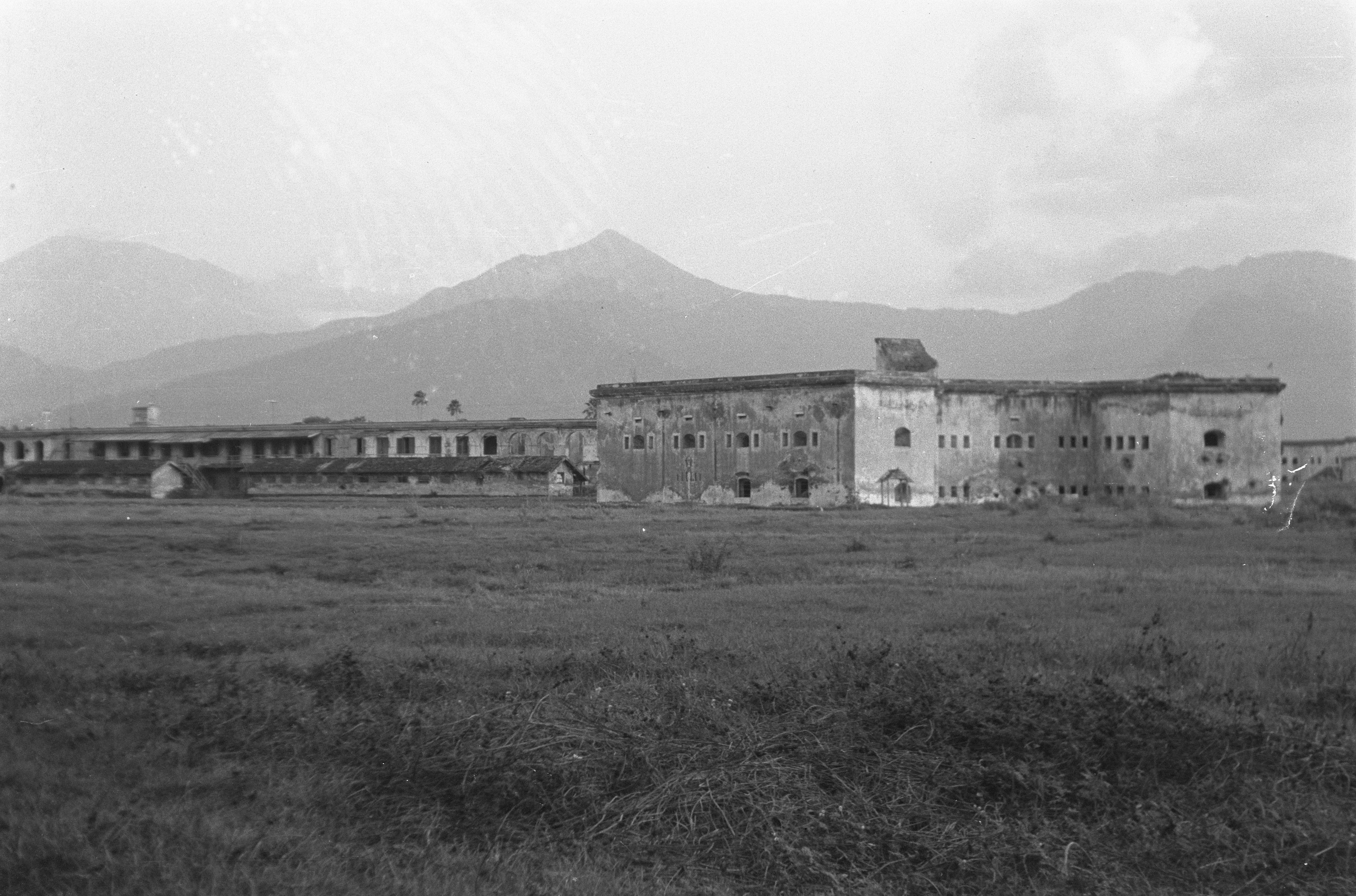
Fort Willem I, circa 1900s-1930s

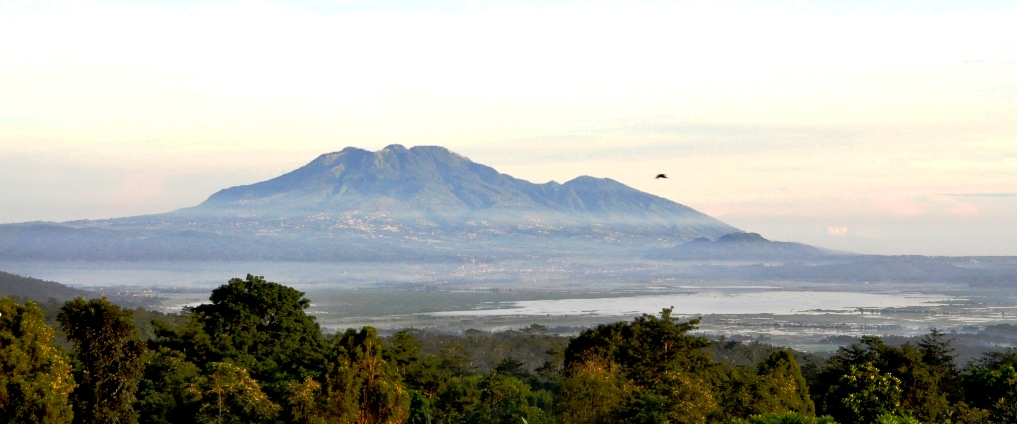
Mount Ungaran and Lake Rawapening

== Battle of Ambarawa ==
The town of Ambarawa was the site of the Battle of Ambarawa which itself was a part of the greater Indonesian War of Independence. By the end of WWII, Allied Troops were hunting down the remaining Japanese holdouts in South East Asia. British soldiers, led by Brigadier Richard Bethell, came to the city of Semarang to disarm Japanese troops and liberate POWs and their presence was initially welcomed by the Governor of Central Java Wongsonegoro. However, the locals were angered by the fact that Dutch POWs were being armed and triggered actions by the People's Security Army (TKR). The Allied Troops were overrun and escaped to nearby Ambarawa. On 12 December 1945, Col. Soedirman led an assault against the Allied troops and successfully cut-off their supply chain. The battle ended on 15 December 1945, with the Indonesian Army forcing Allied Troops to retreat back to Semarang.

== Tourist attractions ==
- Kampoeng Rawa
- Indonesian Railway Museum
- Fort Willem I

== Notable people ==
- Simon Sanches, Dutch navy nurse and laboratory technician who planned to commit a coup d'état in Suriname.
