= Frans Killinger =

- Born: Frans Pavel Vaclav Killinger; 14 November 1875; Hodony, Austria-Hungary (nowadays Hodoni, in Romania)
- Died: 1936 (aged 60–61); Turkey
- Other names: Muhammed Tewfig Killinger
- Occupations: military officer, police inspector
- Spouses: Louise Neumann (1906–17 June 1910); Clara Doppelt (6 November 1909–?) (void); Clara Doppelt (WW I–his death)

Frans Pavel Vaclav Killinger (14 November 1875 – 1936/1962) was a military officer and police inspector in Suriname who planned to commit the first coup d'état in Suriname on the night of 25 to 26 May 1910. The coup was betrayed, and he was sentenced to death which was later commuted to five years imprisonment. In December 1913, he was released from jail. Later, he enlisted in the cavalry of the Ottoman Army as Muhammed Tewfig Killinger.

== Biography ==
Killinger was born on 14 November 1875, in Hodony, Austria-Hungary. His father wanted him to become a priest, however Killinger volunteered for the Austro-Hungarian Army in 1894. He accidentally shot and wounded a fellow soldier and was sentenced to two months for carelessness. In 1899, he was discharged from the army.

Killinger tried to go the Transvaal to participate in the Second Boer War, however he was arrested in Hamburg. After paying a fine, he received permission to enlist in the Dutch Army. Initially he wanted to join the Royal Netherlands East Indies Army but was rejected for poor eyesight. He was allowed to sign up for the Netherlands Armed Forces in Suriname.

On 8 December 1899, Killinger arrived in Suriname. On 17 June 1900, he deserted with eight other soldiers, and was jailed for several days. On 9 July, he received a temporarily appointment to the police department. In 1904, he was promoted police inspector. In May 1906, he married Louise Neumann from Paramaribo.

== Coup d'état ==
In 1908, while on an educational leave to Europe, Killinger procured a loan of DM 50,000 with Marlitt, a German banker, for his planned coup d'état. He also left his wife behind in Germany, and married Clara Doppelt in London on 6 November 1909. When he returned to Suriname, the initial plan failed, because the promised loan was never delivered, and Neumann, his ex-wife, managed to return to Suriname on 4 April 1910, and filed for divorce. The divorce was granted on 17 June, and after selling the house, Neumann left for New York City. On 1 October, his son Fereinz Napoleon Doppelt was born.

Killinger started to discuss his plans to overthrow the government and install a dictatorship with his fellow policemen. He managed to recruit six accomplices. Killinger would lead the new republic as President-Dictator. Suriname would have a bicameral legislature, but without ministers. He would compensate the Netherlands for its losses and assumed that the United States and South American countries would back him. He would end corruption, assure better treatment for the immigrants, diversify the economy, and strengthen the police force. The gasworks in Paramaribo would be closed down and replaced by a hydro-electric plant.

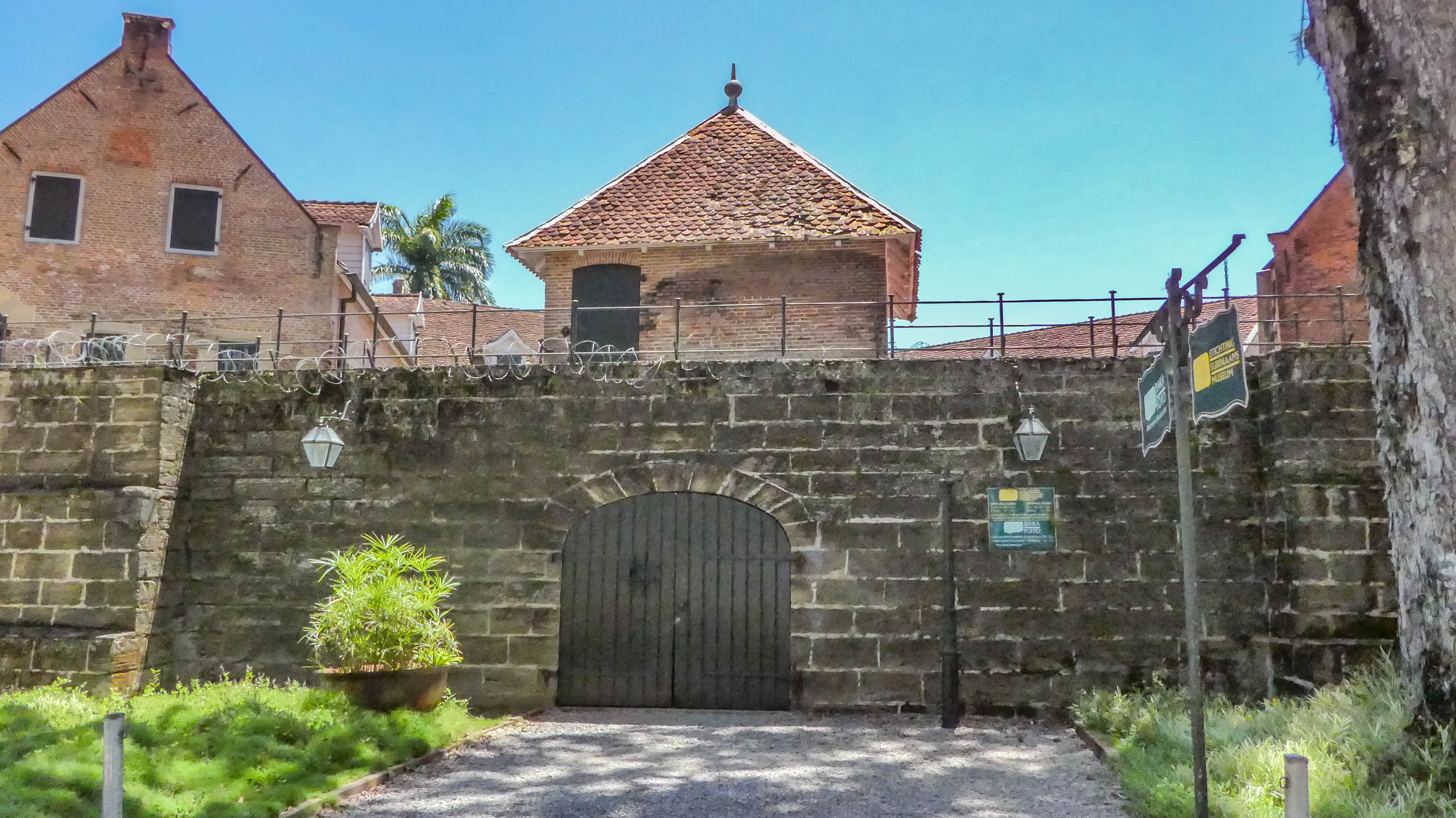
Fort Zeelandia (2016)

The plan was to attack the telegraph and telephone station, Governor's Palace, the Central Bank and Fort Zeelandia where 150 soldiers were stationed. They would arm themselves using guns from the police station, and batons which had been purchased by Willem Arduin.

Police officer Jatan was tasked to recruit a militia of Indo-Surinamese lathi warriors from sugar estate Mariënburg where a 1902 strike had turned into a massacre. He had talked with 17 people, but not managed to convince a single one. Jatan told Killinger at a conspiracy meeting that he had recruited 45 warriors.

The attack was scheduled for the night of 25 to 26 May 1910. Former police officer Jacob Schoonhoven was asked to form a posse of strong and tough men, however he had second thoughts, discussed the matter with his priest, and reported Killinger to the Prosecutor General. On 19 May, Killinger was summoned to report to the Prosecutor General, and was immediately suspended pending investigation. On 23 May 1910, Killinger and six accomplices were arrested.

On 13 March 1911, the trial started. During the trial, Killinger affirmed that he considered it his duty to correct injustices in Suriname even it meant breaking the law. Captain Hirschmann, in charge of security of Fort Zeelandia, considered the plan impossible, because 40 armed soldiers were held in reserve who would have been alarmed by the noise. Nevertheless, the sentries near the gate could have been overwhelmed. Hirschmann was of the opinion that the plan would have required dynamite. On 3 April 1911, the judge considered that even though the coup was unlikely to succeed, it would have endangered the lives of the guards of Fort Zeelandia. Even though questions were raised about the mental health of Killinger, he was considered sane. (Note: Dutch law has a different interpretation of insanity compared to the American insanity defense. If doubts are raised about the mental health of an accused, experts are called, and the sentence can be reduced, however the accused can also be sentenced to mandatory treatment for an indefinite period. In this case, the three experts did not consider him insane, therefore, Killinger was not eligible for a reduced sentence.) Therefore, Killinger and accomplices were guilty of conspiracy to overthrow the government, and sentenced to death.

On 18 April, Governor Fock commuted Killinger's sentence to five-year imprisonment to be served in the Netherlands. Jatan, and the other accomplices received 2 to 2½ years to be served in Suriname. Fock wrote in his report to the Minister of Colonies that there was no reason for concern, because he considered the plan a fantasy. He was more concerned, that Killinger had been allowed to join the army and police despite prior convictions.

== Aftermath ==
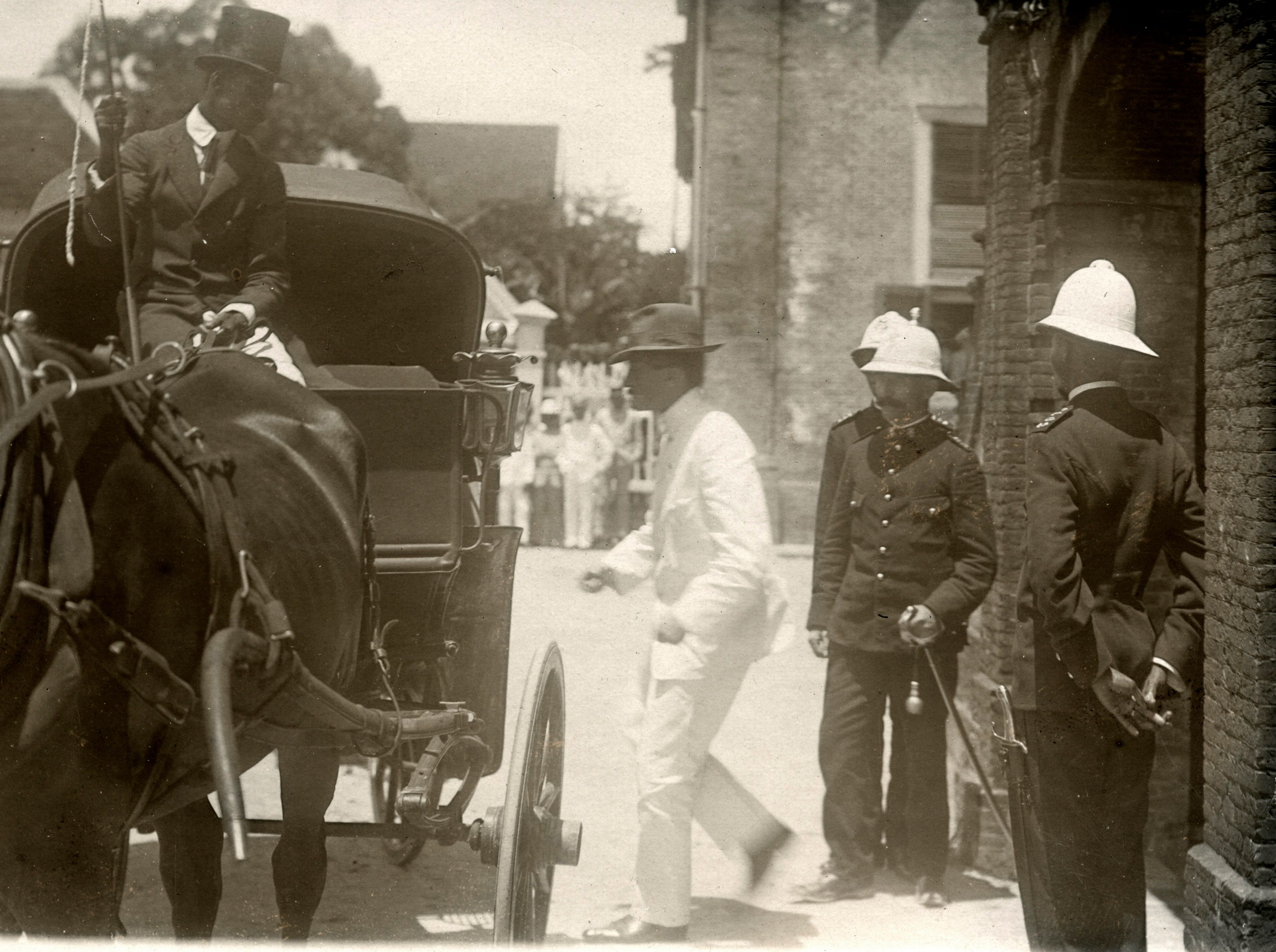
Killinger leaves court on his way to prison, 1911.

On 20 April 1911, Killinger was sent to Amsterdam, where he arrived on 11 May 1911. In February 1912, Clara Doppelt, his second wife, moved from Paramaribo to Amsterdam. The co-conspirators were pardoned on 31 August 1912. Killinger was pardoned effective 1 December 1913. On 20 January 1914, Algemeen Handelsblad published an interview with Killinger who expressed no regrets, and was convinced that his coup would have been a success, if he had not been betrayed. He thanked the Dutch government for their humane treatment of the incident. Killinger and Doppelt left for Hannover on 23 April 1914.

In 1917, it was reported that he had converted to Islam, and had enlisted in the cavalry of the Ottoman Army as Muhammed Tewfig Killinger. He remarried Carla Doppelt in Constantinople. As an Ottoman officer, he had fought in Mesopotamia and the Caucasus during World War I.

After World War I, Killinger moved to Prague, and joined the police. In 1919, he visited the Netherlands to promote the fledgling Czechoslovak Republic. Notions that there was animosity between the Germans, Czechs and Slovaks were brushed aside by Killinger who painted an image of a prosperous, peaceful and democratic republic.

Most sources state that Killinger died in 1936 in Turkey, however Wolfgang Killinger claims that he died in 1962 in Ansbach, Bohemia, Germany. A later year of death is likely, because when Suriname became a constituent country within the Kingdom of the Netherlands in 1954, a letter from Killinger was received by the Surinamese government in which he congratulated Suriname on their autonomy, and stated that it was similar to what he had tried to accomplish for the colony.

== Other conspirators ==
- Jatan also Jathan (c. 1862–9 November 1931) was born in British India and came to Suriname as an indentured labourer on 11 June 1878. He was sentenced to six months imprisonment for a fight on 9 July 1881. Jatan left for Calcutta on 13 August 1886 and returned as a free citizen on 20 May 1898. He was appointed police officer in October 1898. Jatan and Killinger were best friends, and the first person with whom the conspiracy was discussed. He tried to convince Killinger to abandon his plans.
- Louis Arduin (c. 1880–6 April 1921) became a police officer in October 1901. He was a good friend of Killinger, and recruited the other conspirators including his two brothers.
- James Hughes (born c. 1877) was born in Demarara, British Guiana. He arrived in Suriname in 1892, and became police officer in March 1901. Hughes recruited his former colleague and friend Jacob Schoonhoven on 4 May. He expressed regret during the trial.
- Emile Sporkslede (born 1877) became a police officer in November 1898. On 20 April 1909, he saved and resuscitated a drowning child, and was awarded a medal.
- Johannes Arduin (c. 1869–22 February 1950) was the older brother of Louis who worked on a sawmill.
- Willem Arduin (1870–c. 1941) was another brother of Louis who was a carpenter.

== See also ==
- Simon Sanches

== Bibliography ==
- Ramsoedh, Hans (2003). "De revolutie die niet doorging". OSO. Tijdschrift voor Surinaamse taalkunde, letterkunde en geschiedenis (in Dutch).
