= Lake Rawa Pening =

Lake in Central Java, Indonesia

Rawa Pening
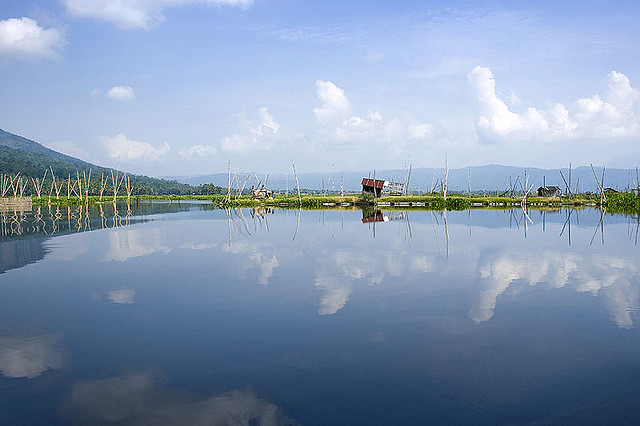
- Rawa Pening in 2008

- Location within Java
- Coordinates: 7°17′S 110°26′E
- Basin countries: Indonesia
- Surface area: 2,500 to 2,670 hectares (25.0 to 26.7 km^{2}; 9.7 to 10.3 sq mi)

Rawa Pening (literally meaning 'Clear Swamp', from the Javanese Bening) is a lake in the Ambarawa Basin in Central Java, Indonesia. It serves as a source of power, irrigation, and flood control, and is used for fishing.

== Location and description ==
Rawa Pening is located in the volcanic Ambarawa Basin in Central Java, between Ambarawa and Salatiga. It covers a total area of 2,500 to 2,670 hectares (25.0 to 26.7 km^{2}; 9.7 to 10.3 sq mi). It is shallow and swamplike, with muddy banks.

== History ==
Rawa Pening is estimated to have been formed between 18,000 and 13,500 BC after a period of increased precipitation. It reached its largest size from 11,000 to 9,000 BC but shrank until it reached its current size around 6,000 BC.

To protect Rawa Pening, the local government has enacted a green belt policy. Several establishments, such as the tourist attraction Kampoeng Rawa, were controversial owing to their construction within this belt.

== Role ==
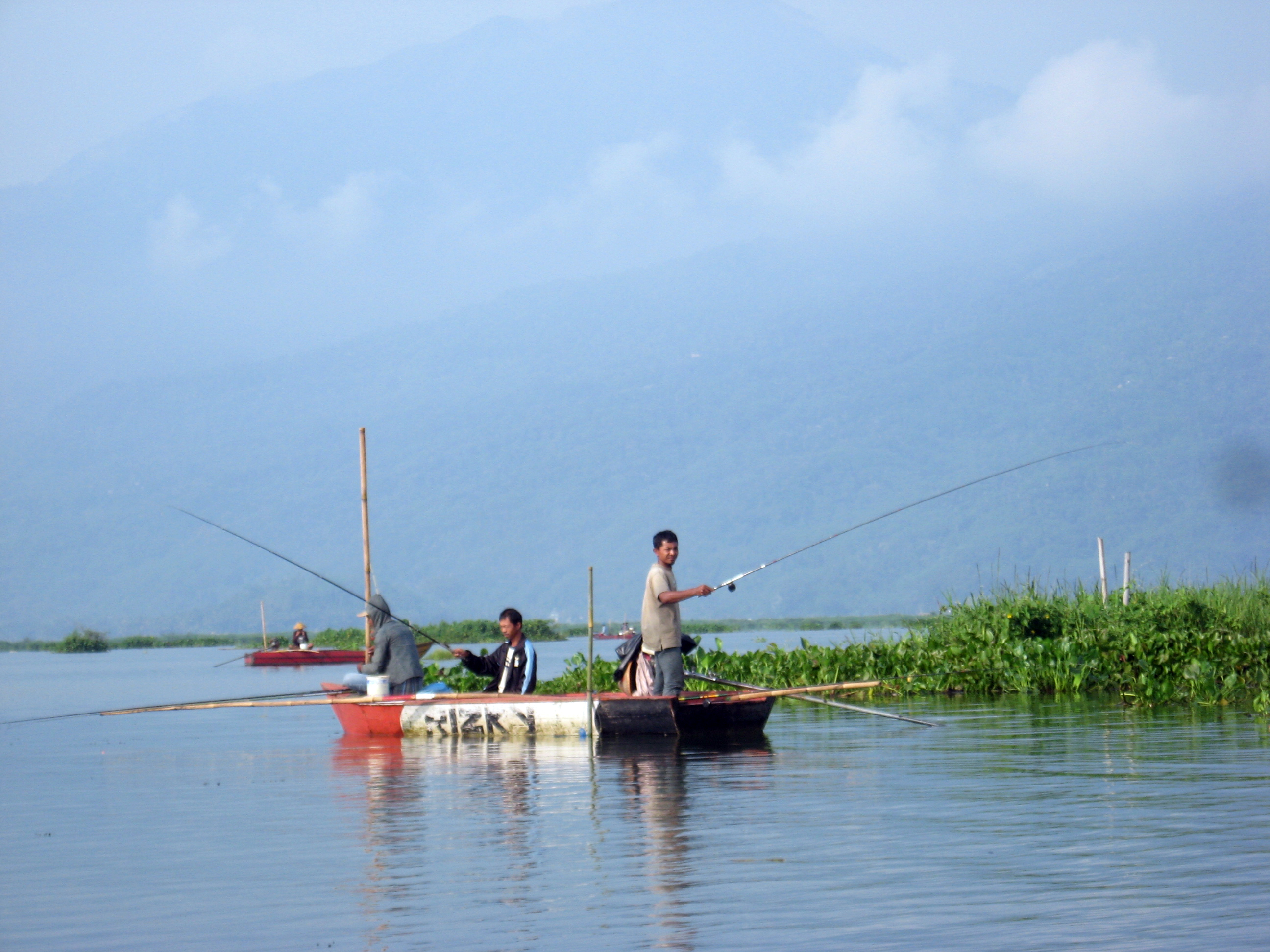
Fishing is common on Rawa Pening

One of the major roles of Rawa Pening is as a source of hydroelectricity, with a power station located on the Tuntang River near the lake. Fishing is common as a source of supplementary income, and the water from the lake irrigates nearby rice fields. It has also been cited as being used for flood control.

== Plant infestation ==
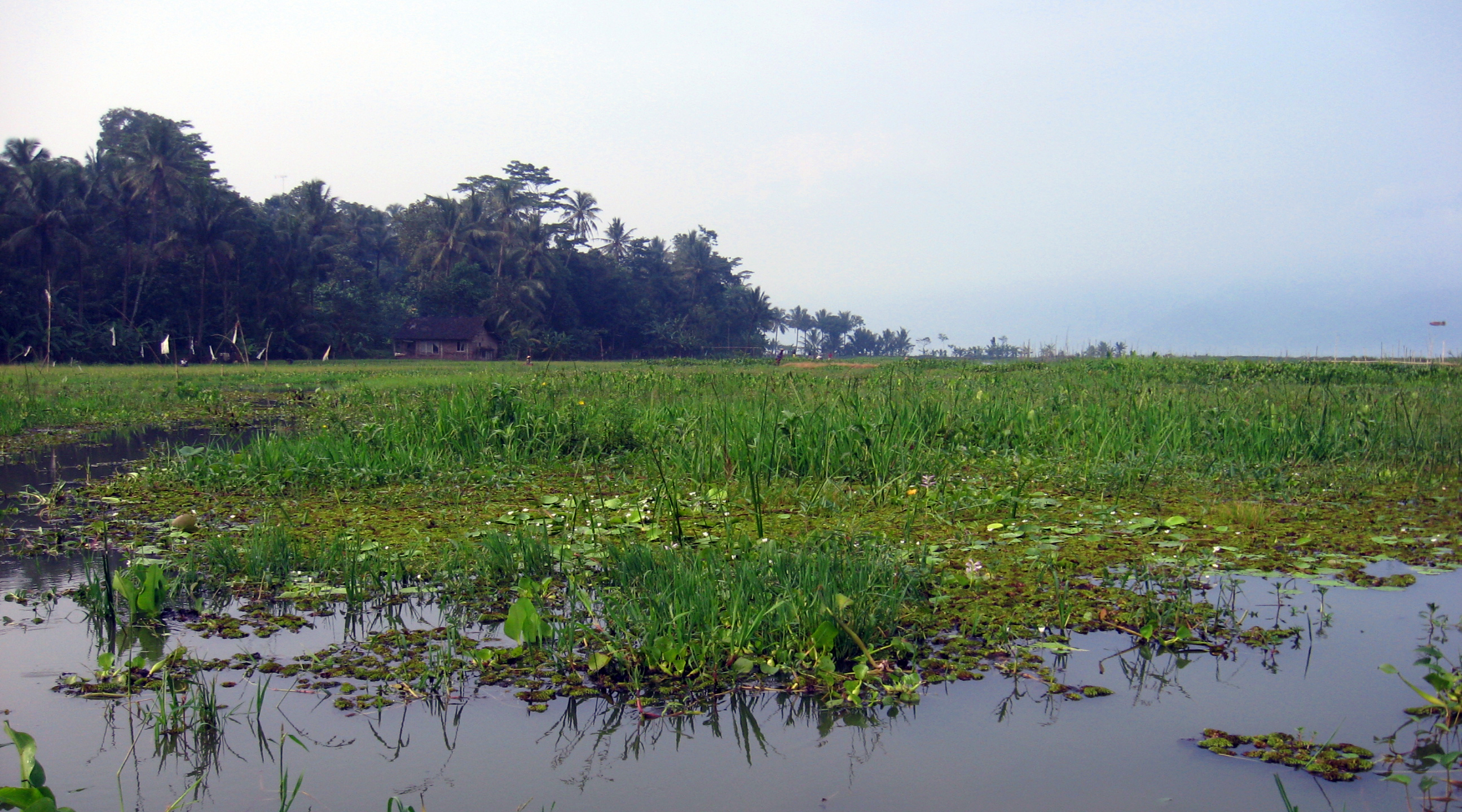
Many species of aquatic plants are found at Rawa Pening

Numerous species of aquatic plants live in Rawa Pening, including Panicum repens, Eichhornia crassipes, Salvinia cucullata, and Hydrilla verticillata. Estimates of the total number of species vary, from 20 in 1949 to 19 aquatic and 71 semi-aquatic species in 1972. According to Soenarto Hardjosuwarno, P. repens is one of the main contributors to the formation of floating islands in the lake, with M. Soerjani noting that E. crassipes and S. cucullata also contribute. The aquatic plants, such as H. verticillatta, take root in a large amount of peat (in some places measuring 2 metres (6.6 ft) thick), causing more peat to gather. Eventually, terrestrial plants take root in the floating islands as well.

According to Tri Retnaningsih Soeprobowati, a researcher at Diponegoro University in Semarang, Rawa Pening could become dry by 2021 due to increasing sedimentation. She reports a total rate of deposition of 270 to 880 kilograms (600 to 1,940 lb) per day, averaging 780 tonnes yearly, with the water level dropping 29% since 1989. The overabundance of aquatic plants has been blamed, especially E. crassipes. As such, there are calls for a culling of the E. crassipes population to 20% by 2030. Other suggestions include the introduction of grass carp to control the plant population and the use of herbicides as last resorts. The destruction of H. verticillatta had earlier been attempted beginning in 1932, originally using mechanical methods but later switching to herbicides, These efforts were discontinued in the 1960s.
