= Mount Telomoyo =

Mountain in Central Java, Indonesia

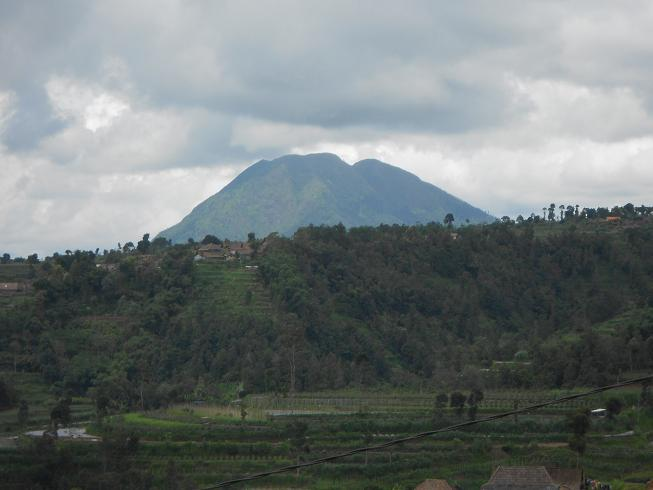
- Mount Telomoyo seen from Ketep Pass

Highest point
- Elevation: 1,894 m (6,214 ft)
- Coordinates: 7.37°S 110.40°E

Geography
- Location within Java Location within Indonesia
- Location: Java, Indonesia

Geology
- Rock age: Holocene
- Mountain type: Stratovolcano
- Volcanic arc: Sunda Arc
- Last eruption: Unknown

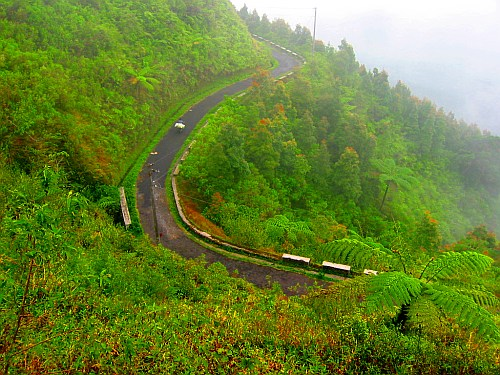
The road to Mount Telomoyo

Mount Telomoyo is a stratovolcano in Central Java, Indonesia. The volcano was constructed over the southern flank of the eroded Pleistocene-age Soropati volcano, which has a height of 1,300 metres (4,300 ft). The Soropati volcano collapsed during the Pleistocene, leaving a U-shaped depression. Mount Telomoyo grows on the southern side of the depression, reaching over 600 metres (2,000 ft) above the depression's rim.

== See also ==
- List of volcanoes in Indonesia
