= Wisma BCA Salatiga =

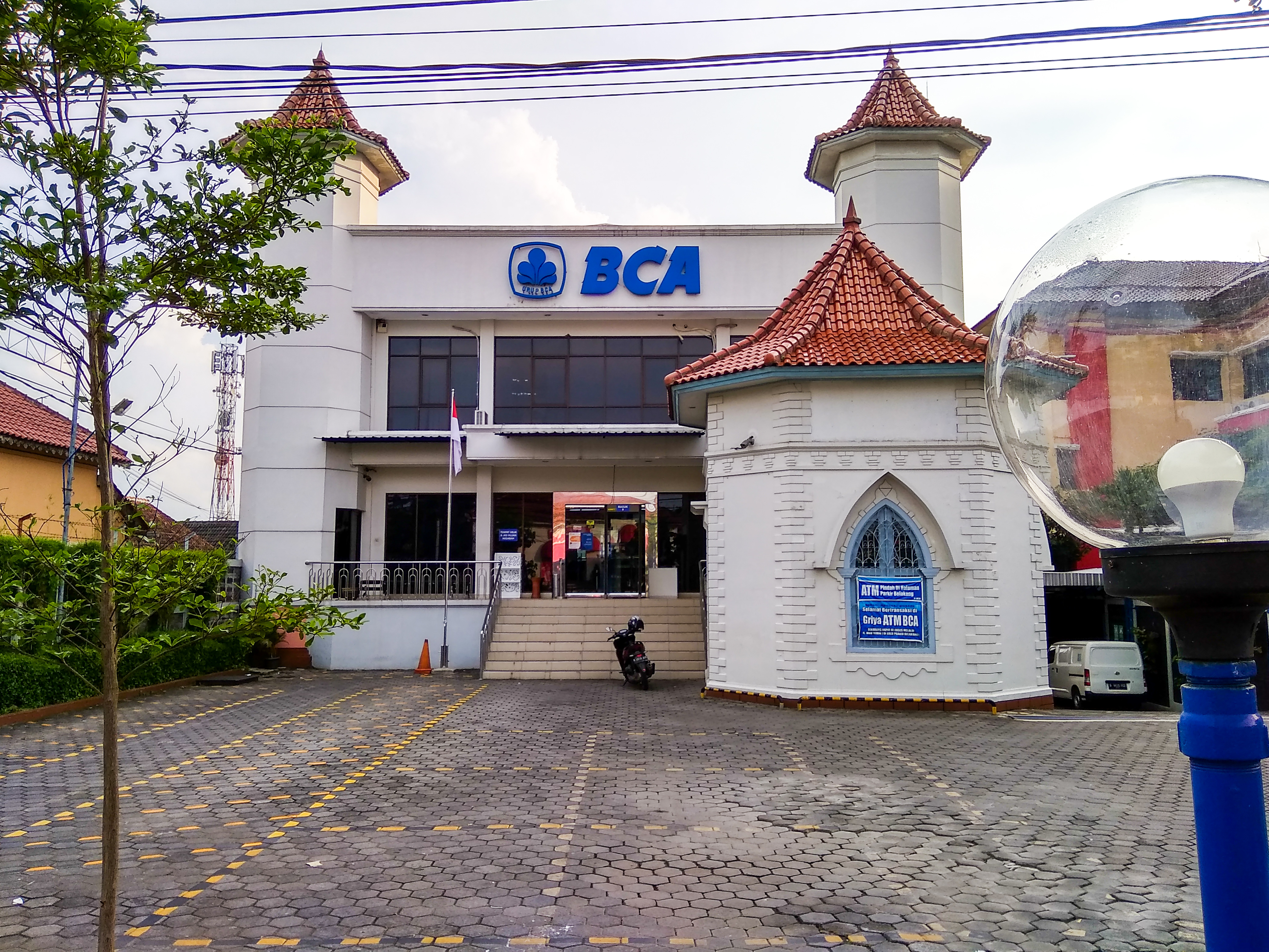
Wisma BCA Salatiga.

Wisma BCA Salatiga is a building proposed for potential designation as a cultural heritage site. It is located at No. 15 Diponegoro Street, Salatiga Village, Sidorejo District, Salatiga City, Central Java Province. During the gemeente (municipality) period, this structure served as a retreat house, symbolizing the characteristics of a modern city. As of 2025, the building remains well-preserved and continues to function as the office of Bank Central Asia (BCA) in Salatiga City.

== Condition ==
Wisma BCA Salatiga is located in a strategic area on Diponegoro Road, which was formerly known as Toentangscheweg. During the municipal administration, this area developed into a city center known as Europeesche Wijk. According to Prakosa and Supangkat, the area was exclusively designated for Europeans, Foreign Easterners, and natives with incomes equivalent to those of European employees, classified as category A (the highest salary grade).

The building is estimated to be over 100 years old. It retains its classic tower, which has been repurposed as a machine room for automated teller machines. In the past, it was known as de Mestein Pensioenshotel (the Pensioners' Hotel). Wisma BCA Salatiga serves as an example of a hotel and lodging facility in Salatiga City, typical of modern cities from its era. Designed in an Art Deco style with Gothic ornaments and pointed windows, it was originally a retreat house for individuals recovering from illness, based on the belief that the location could aid recovery.

The building has an octagonal structure with Indo-European architectural features, observable in its twin towers. A pavilion is located at both the front and rear of the building, providing guests with opportunities to bask in sunlight while enjoying the surrounding natural beauty. Before being occupied by BCA, the property was once home to Salon Harapan. As of 2025, the building remains in excellent condition and serves as the BCA office in Salatiga City. Wisma BCA Salatiga has been listed as a cultural heritage site in Salatiga under Inventory Number 11-73/Sla/10. (Note: The listing is based on studies and identification of historical buildings in Salatiga, conducted by the Regional Development Planning Agency (BAPPEDA) of Salatiga in collaboration with the Central Java Cultural Heritage Preservation Agency (BPCB) in 2009 (Hatmadji, dkk 2009, pp. 3).)

== Additional references ==
Book

- Darmiati, dkk (1999). Otonomi Daerah di Hindia-Belanda (1903–1940). Jakarta: CV. Sejahtera.
- Handjojo, M.S. (1978). Riwayat Kota Salatiga. Salatiga: Sechan Press.
- Harnoko, Darto, dkk (2008). Salatiga dalam Lintasan Sejarah. Salatiga: Dinas Pariwisata, Seni, Budaya, dan Olah Raga Kota Salatiga.
- Kartoatmadja, dkk (1995). Hari Jadi Kota Salatiga 24 Juli 750. Salatiga: Pemerintah Daerah Kotamadya Daerah Tingkat II Salatiga.
- Oemar, Mohammad, dkk (1978). Sedjarah Daerah Jawa Tengah. Jakarta: Departemen Pendidikan dan Kebudayaan.
- Purnomo, Daru, dkk (2015). Kajian Pemekaran Kota Salatiga. Salatiga: Pusat Kajian Kependudukan dan Pemukiman Fakultas Ilmu Sosial dan Komunikasi Universitas Kristen Satya Wacana.
