= Selo, Java =

Javanese village between mounts Merbabu and Merapi

Coordinates: 7°29′48″S 110°28′17″E

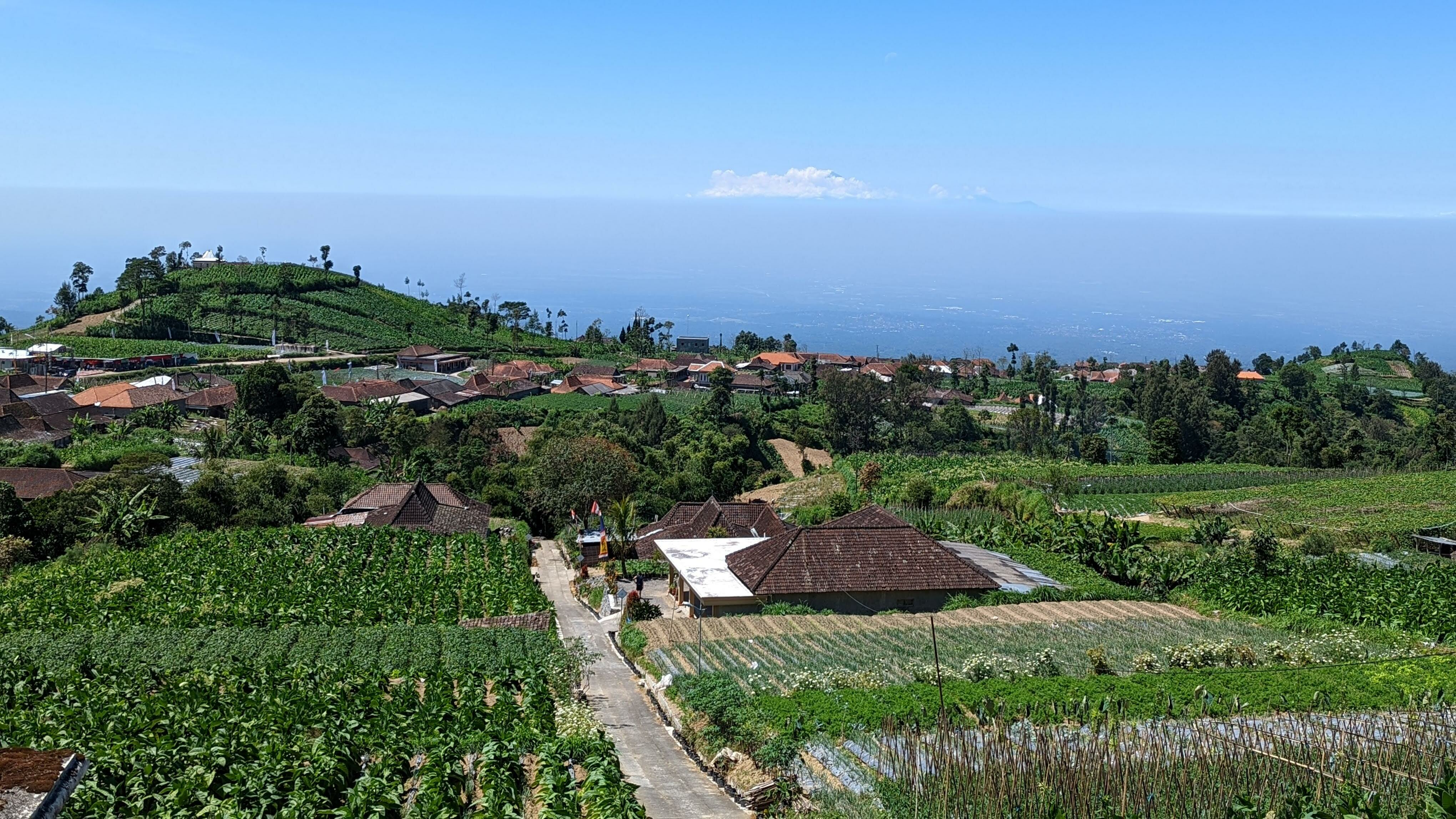
Selo in 2022

Selo in Java, Indonesia, is a village on the saddle of ground between two volcanoes in Central Java, Mount Merbabu and Mount Merapi. It is regularly identified as Selo, Boyolali, due to its district name and immediate administrative centre having that name.

It is situated on the northern lower slopes of Merapi and the southern slope of Merbabu.

When Merapi is inactive between eruptions, Selo is often utilised for walkers to go up to the volcano crater as an alternative to the older and more difficult climbing routes from Kaliurang on the southern slopes.
