= Kopeng =

Village in Semarang Regency, Central Java Province, Indonesia

Coordinates: 7.3998°S 110.4177°E

Kopeng is a village in the district of Getasan, in Semarang Regency, Central Java, Indonesia.

Kopeng is a mountainous town (1500 m above sea level) located near the city of Salatiga. There are several tourist destinations there. Mount Merbabu is nearby. Kopeng Treetop Adventure Park is a tourist attraction set in nature. This recreational park is located in the woods at the foot of Mount Merbabu and has become a popular attraction for families who wish to spend their weekends or holidays with a refreshing activity in nature.
