= Mount Merbabu =

Stratovolcano in Central Java, Indonesia

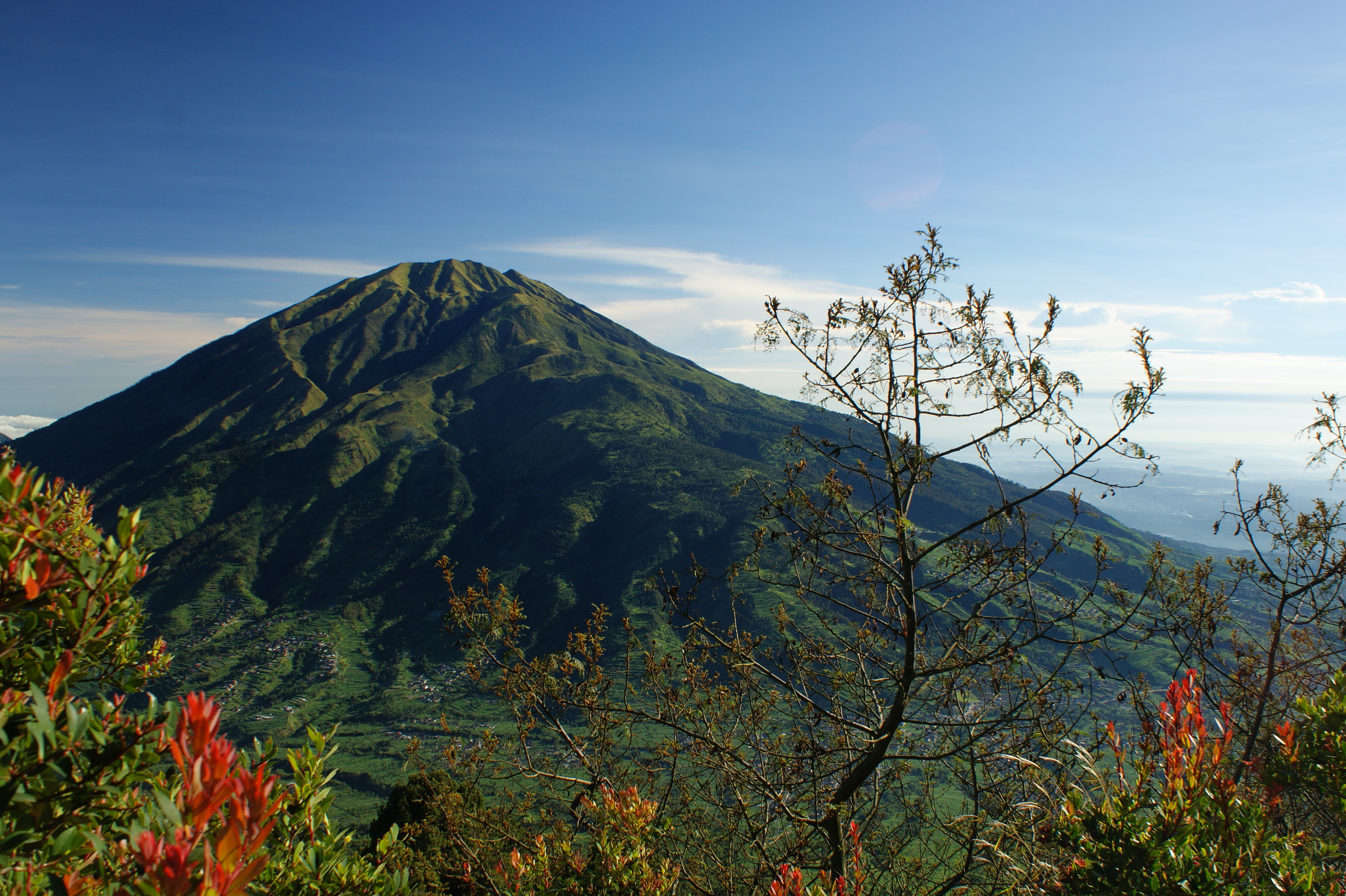
- Mt Merbabu viewed from Mount Merapi

Highest point
- Elevation: 3,145 m (10,318 ft)
- Prominence: 2,432 m (7,979 ft)
- Listing: Ultra; Ribu
- Coordinates: 07°27′18″S 110°26′24″E

Naming
- English translation: Mountain of ash
- Language of name: Indonesian

Geography
- Location within Java Location within Indonesia
- Location: Java, Indonesia
- Parent range: Sunda Arc

Geology
- Rock age: 700.000 Years
- Mountain type: Dormant stratovolcano
- Volcanic arc: Sunda Arc
- Last eruption: 1797

Climbing
- Easiest route: Hike starting near Kopeng

Mount Merbabu (Indonesian: Gunung Merbabu) is a dormant stratovolcano in Central Java province on the Indonesian island of Java. The name Merbabu could be loosely translated as 'Mountain of Ash' from the Javanese combined words; Meru means "mountain" and awu or abu means "ash".

The active volcano Mount Merapi is directly adjacent on its southeast side, while the city of Salatiga is located on its northern foothills. A 1,500m high broad saddle lies between Merbabu and Merapi, the site of the village of Selo, Java, and highly fertile farming land.

There are two peaks; Syarif (3,119 m) and Kenteng Songo (3,145 m). Three U-shaped radial valleys extend from the Kenteng Songo summit in northwesterly, northeasterly, and southeasterly directions.

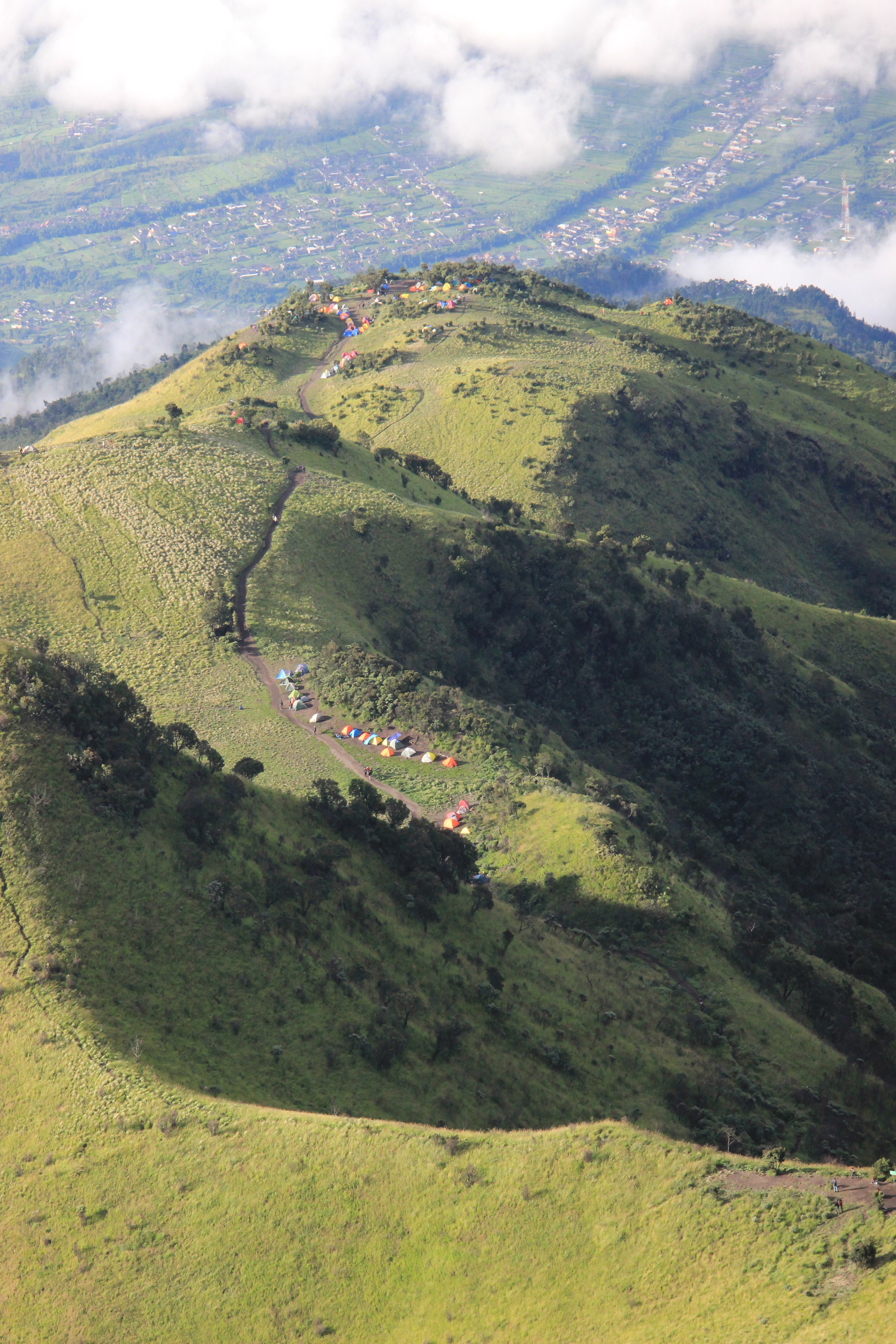
Grasslands at the mountain's summit

Two known moderate eruptions occurred in 1560 and 1797. The 1797 event was rated 2: Explosive, on the volcanic explosivity index. An unconfirmed eruption may have occurred in 1570.

Geologically recent eruptions originated from a North Northwest-South Southeast fissure system that cut across the summit and fed the large-volume lava flows from Kopeng and Kajor craters on the northern and southern flanks, respectively.

Merbabu can be climbed from several routes originating from the town of Kopeng on the northeast side, and also from Selo on the southern side. A climb from Kopeng to Kenteng Songo takes between 8 and 10 hours.

An area of 57 square kilometres (22 sq mi) at the mountain has been declared a national park in 2004.

== See also ==
- List of volcanoes in Indonesia
- List of ultras of the Malay Archipelago
- Argo Merbabu
