= Plumpungan Inscription =

Stone monolith carving near Salatiga, Indonesia

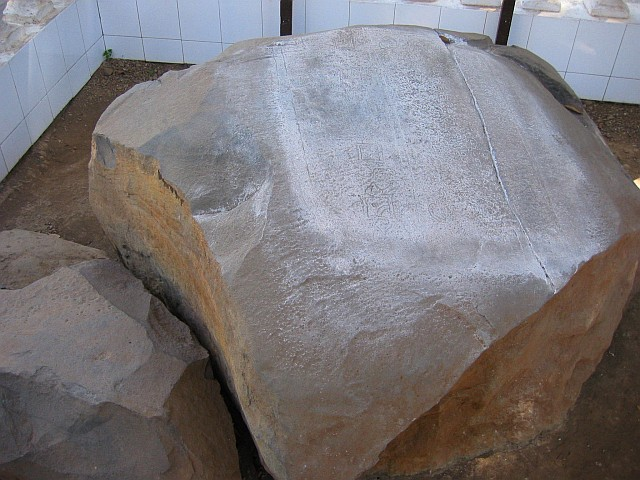
Prasasti Plumpungan

The Plumpungan Inscription (Indonesian: Prasasti Plumpungan) is a stone monolith carving that was found in the area of Salatiga, a small town in Central Java in Indonesia.

The monolith is located about 4 km from Salatiga township, towards Beringin village (7°18′25″S 110°30′46″E).

== Inscriptions ==
1. //Srir = astu swasti prajabyah sakakalatita 672/4/31/..(..)
2. Jnaddyaham //O//
3. //dharmmartham ksetradanam yad = udayajananam yo dadatisabhaktya
4. hampragramam triaramyamahitam = anumatam siddhadewyasca tasyah
5. kosamragrawalekhaksarawidhiwidhitam prantasimawidhanam
6. tasyaitad = bhanunamno bhuwi bhatu yaso jiwitamcatwa nityam

== Official Translation (Indonesian) ==
1. Semoga bahagia ! Selamatlah rakyat sekalian ! Tahun Saka telah berjalan 672/4/31 (24 Juli 760m) pada hari Jumat
2. tengah hari
3. Dari beliau, demi agama untuk kebaktian kepada yang Maha Tinggi, telah menganugerahkan sebidang tanah atau taman, agar memberikan kebahagiaan kepada mereka
4. yaitu desa Hampra yang terletak di wilayah Trigramyama (Salatiga) dengan persetujuan dari Siddhdewi (Sang Dewi yang Sempurna atau Mendiang) berupa daerah bebas pajak atau perdikan
5. ditetapkan dengan tulisan aksara atau prasasti yang ditulis menggunakan ujung mempelam
6. dari beliau yang bernama Bhanu. (dan mereka) dengan bangunan suci atau candi ini. Selalu menemukan hidup abadi

== Unofficial English translation ==
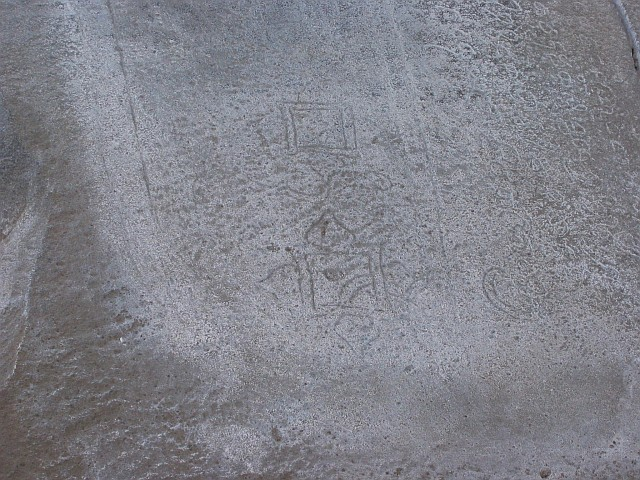
Close up of Prasasti Plumpungan

1. Be happy ! All the Peoples ! The Saka year is 672/4/31 (24 July 760 AD) on Friday
2. mid-day
3. From Him, for the faith, for the congregation to the Almighty, has given land or park, for their prosperity
4. which is the village of Hampra, located in the vicinity of Trigramyama (Salatiga) with the blessing of Siddhewi (the goddess who is perfect or late) as a tax-free are, or perdikan
5. noted with writing or monolith which uses the tip of the palm
6. from Him who is called Bhanu. (and them) with this sacred building or temple. Always find eternal life
