= Salatiga =

City in Central Java, Indonesia

- City
- City of Salatiga; Kota Salatiga

Javanese transcription(s)
  - Hanacaraka: ꦯꦭꦠꦶꦒ
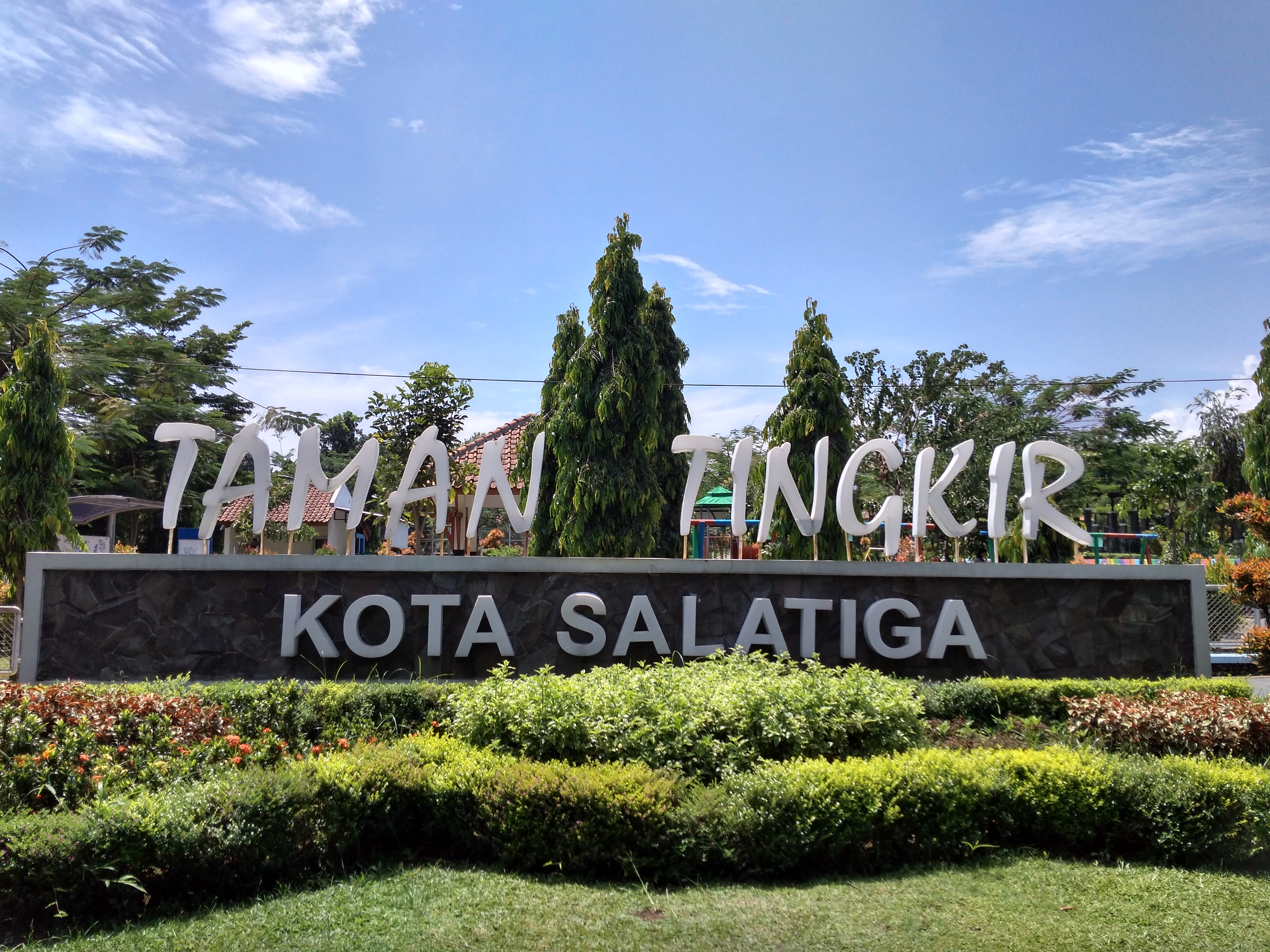
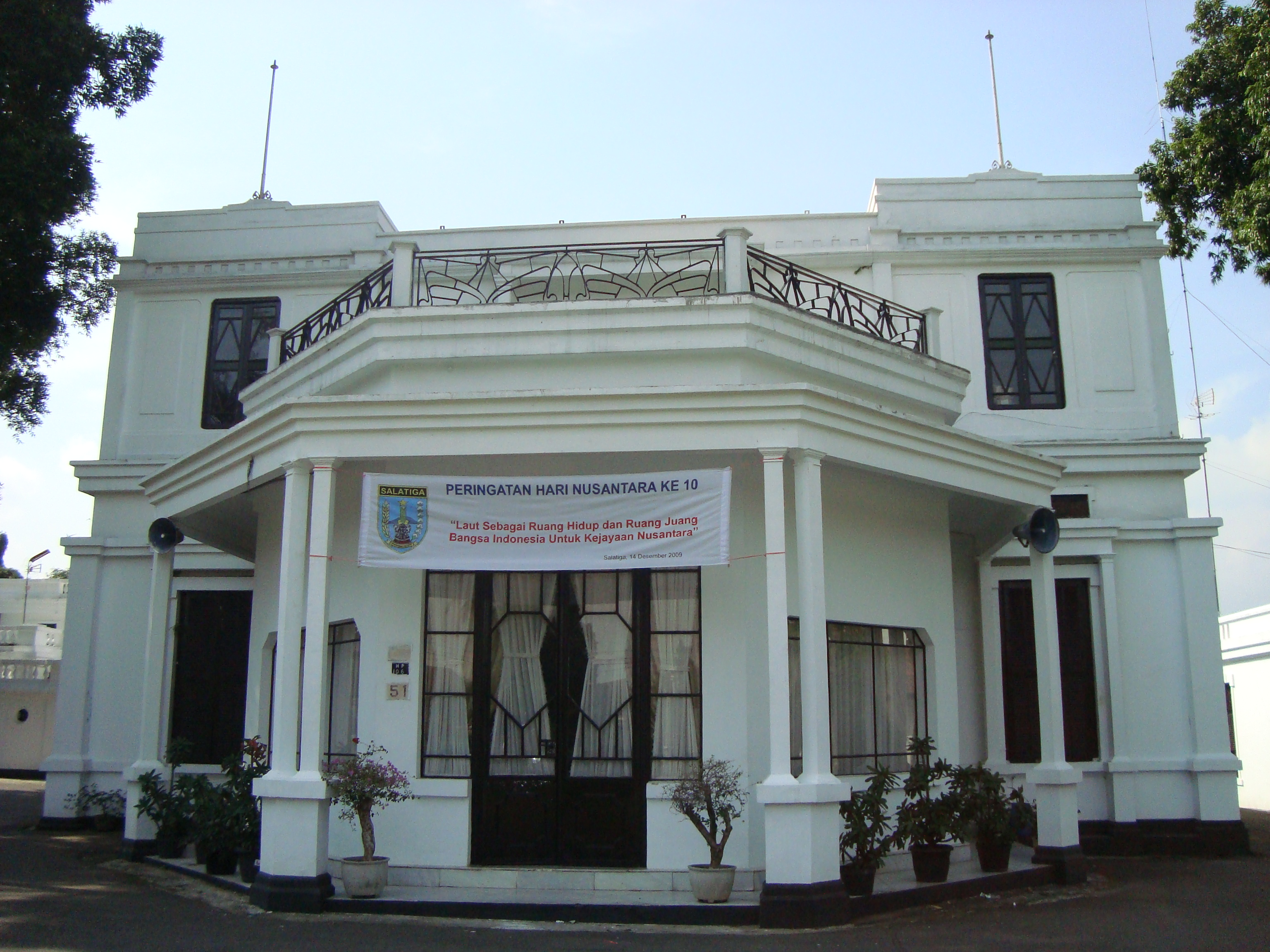
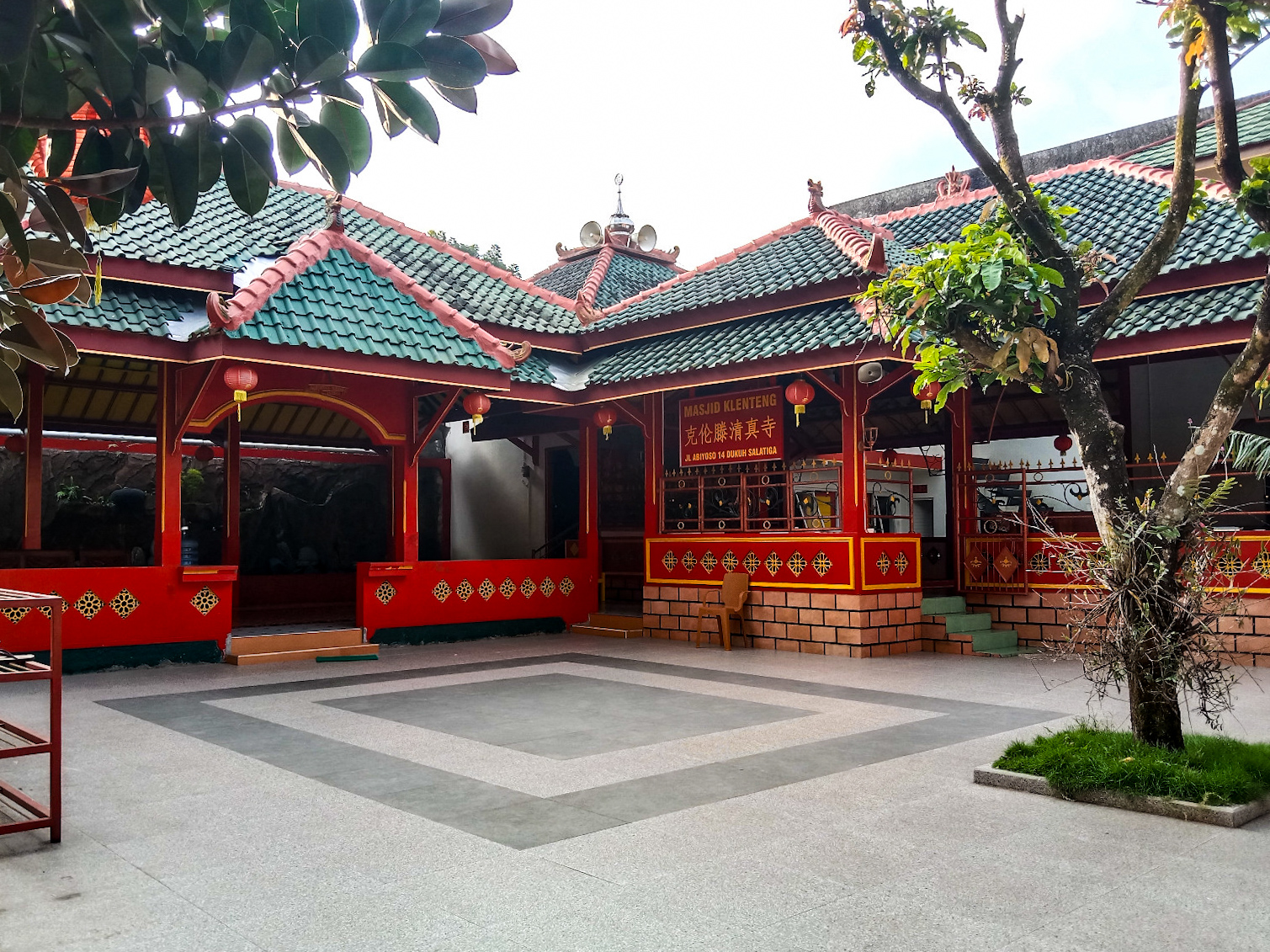
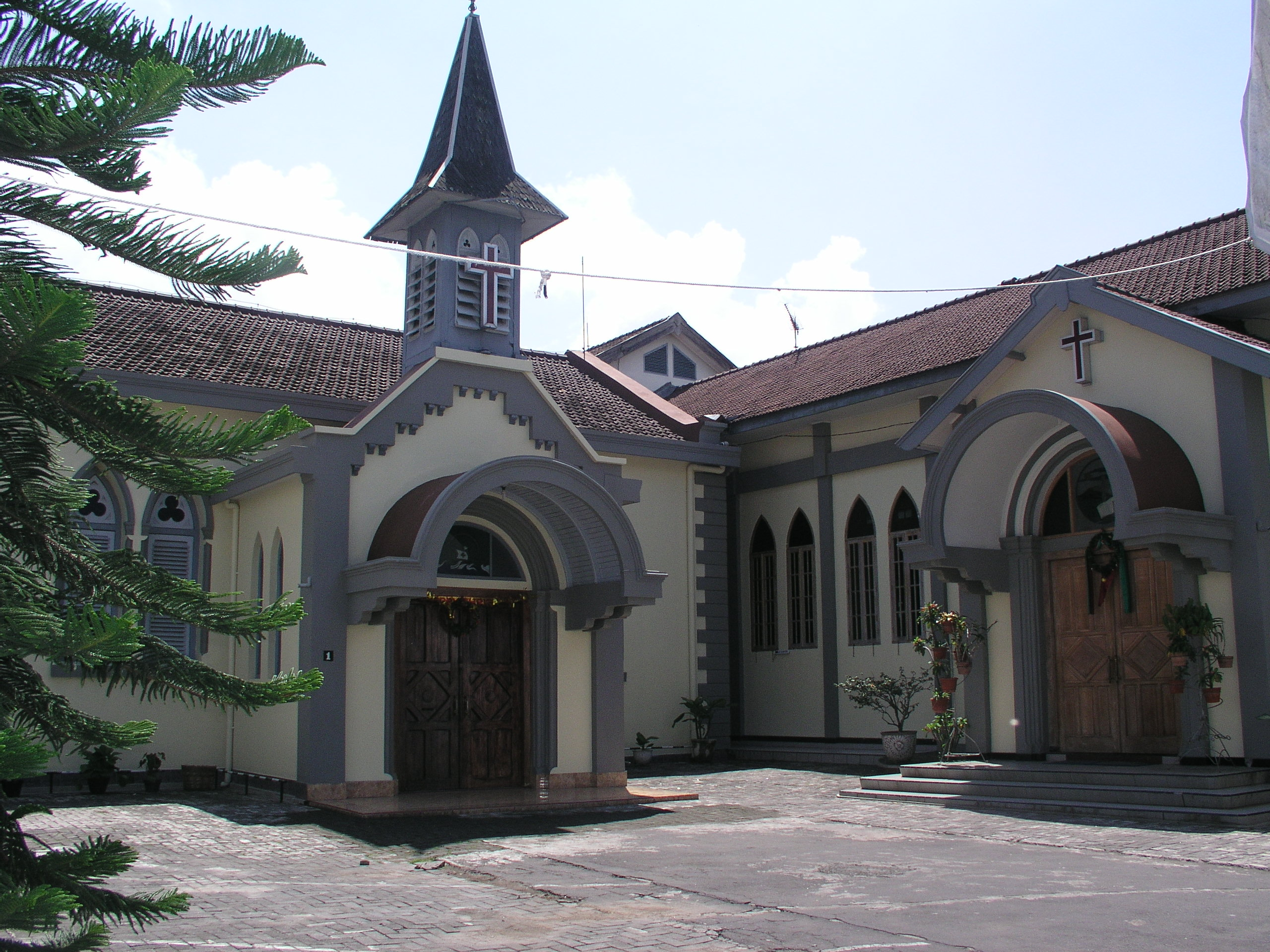
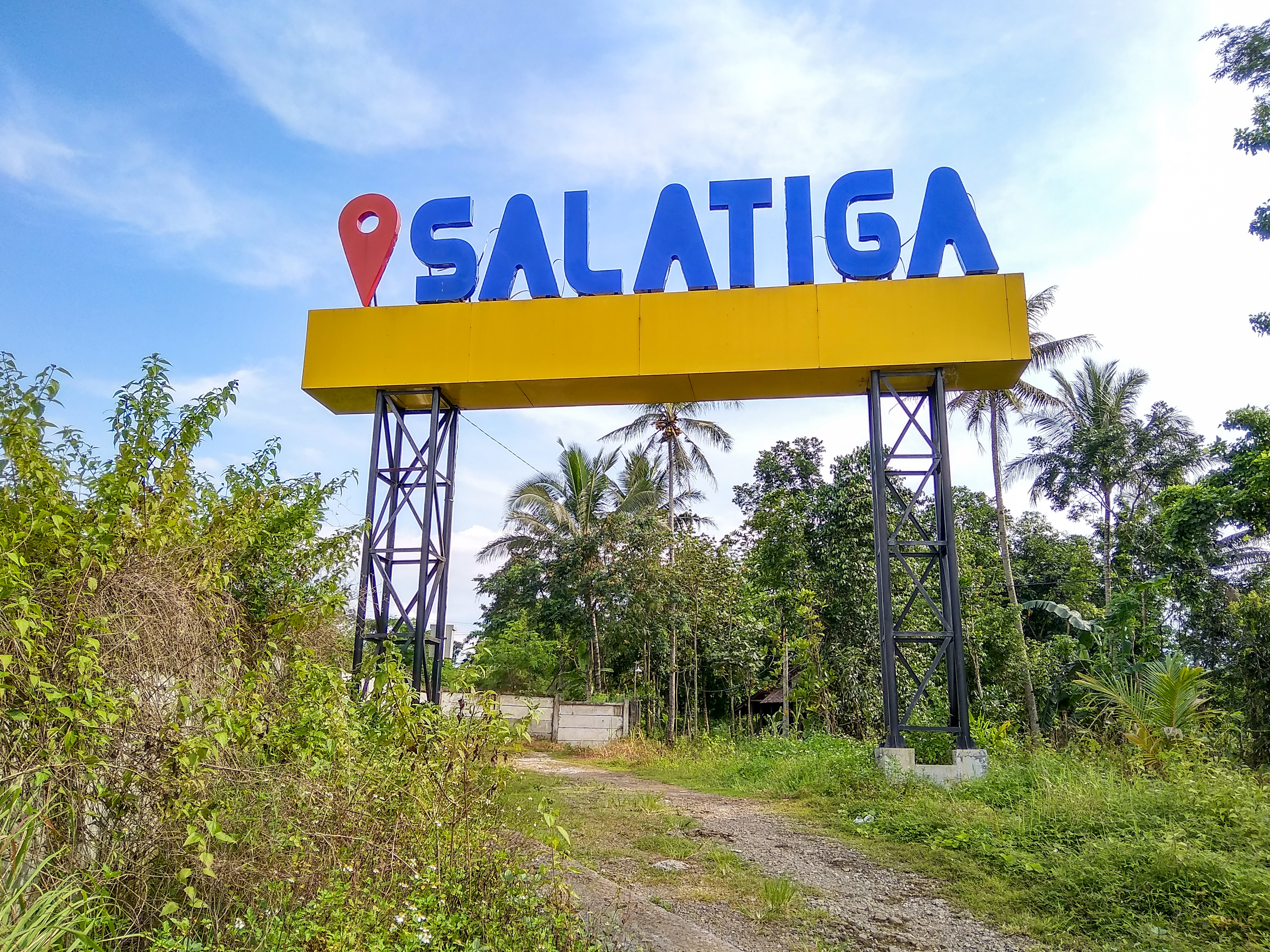
- Tingkir Park Salatiga; Salatiga City Hall; Krajan Dukuh Mosque; GPIB In Tamansari; Salatiga entrance sign at the Salatiga-Bawen Area toll road

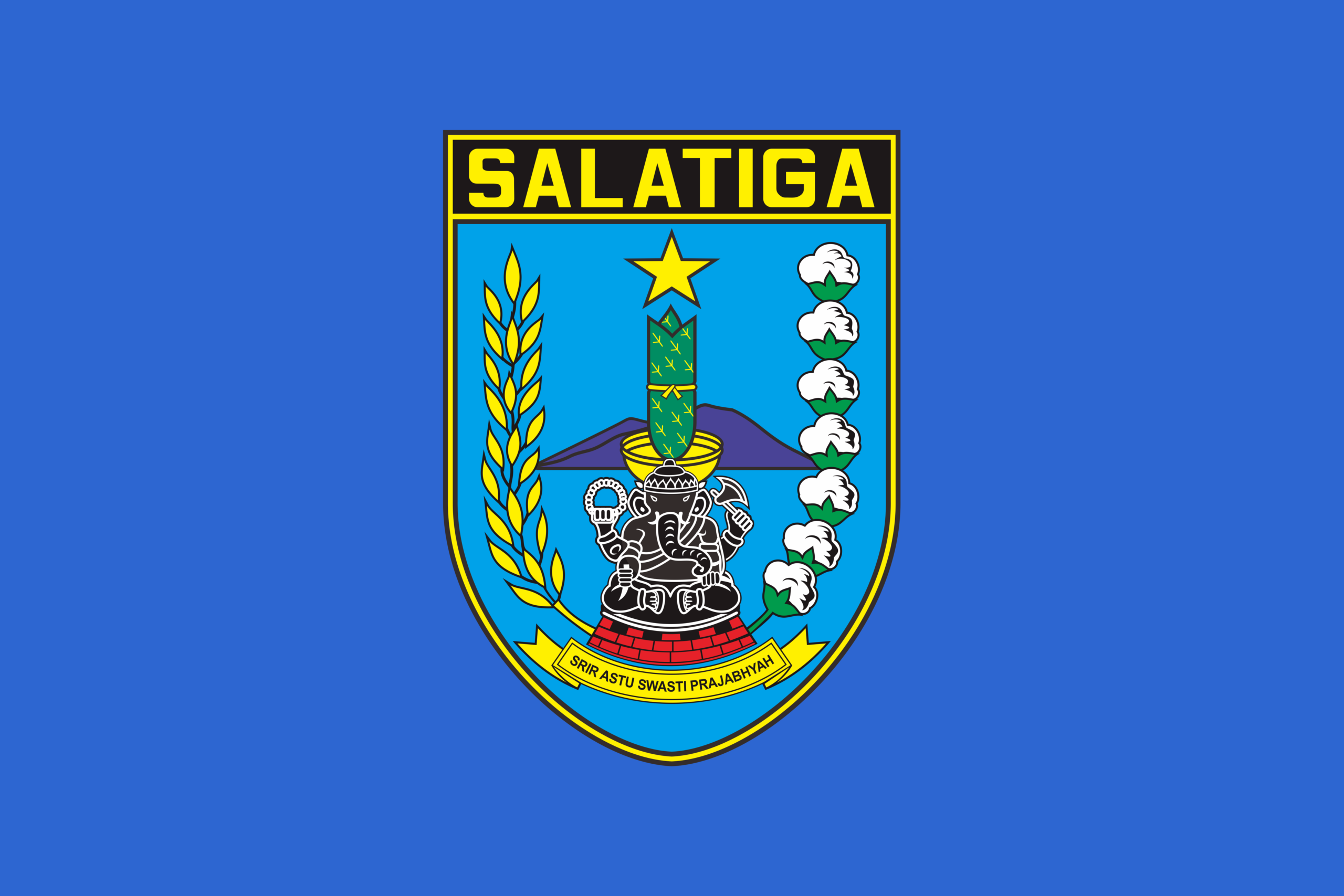
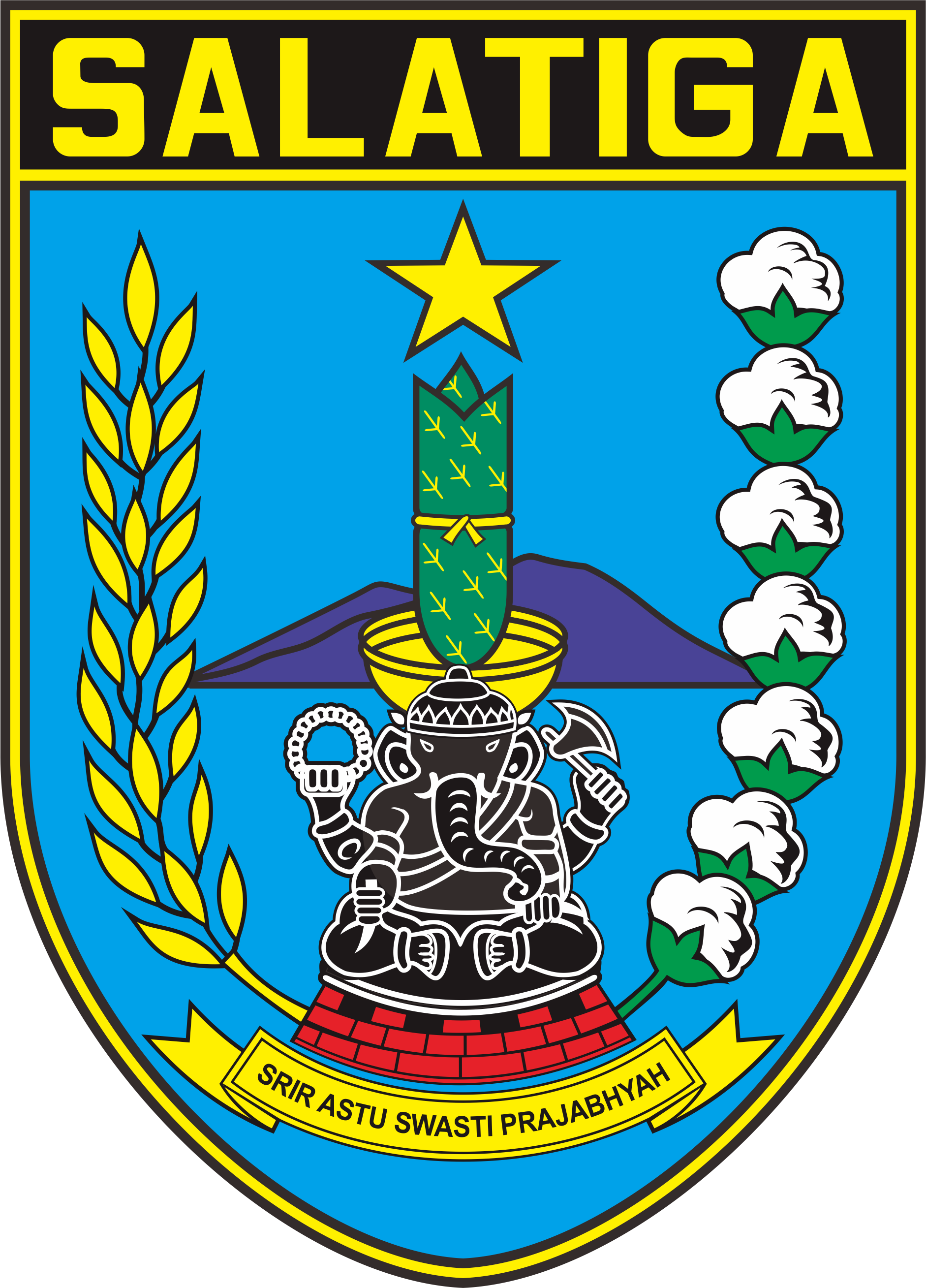
- Flag Coat of arms
- Motto: Çrir Astu Swasti Prajabhyah (May all the people be happy and safe); Salatiga Hati Beriman (Salatiga, a Heart of Faith)
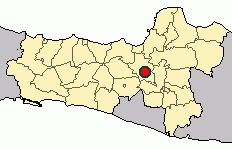
- Location within Central Java

- Location in Java and Indonesia Salatiga (Indonesia)
- Coordinates: 7°19′29″S 110°32′39.79″E
- Country: Indonesia
- Province: Central Java
- Metropolitan area: Kedungsepur
- Founded: 24 July 750
- Incorporated: 1 July 1917

Government
  - Mayor: Robby Hernawan
  - Vice Mayor: Nina Agustin

Area
  - Total: 54.98 km^{2} (21.23 sq mi)
- Elevation: 571 m (1,873 ft)

Population (mid 2025 estimate)
  - Total: 199,906
  - Density: 3,636/km^{2} (9,417/sq mi)

Demographics
  - Ethnic groups: Javanese; Chinese Bataks; Sundanese Melanesians
- Time zone: UTC+7 (Indonesia Western Standard Time)
- Area code: (+62) 298
- Vehicle registration: H
- Languages: Indonesian Javanese; Batak; English (by the expat community) Many other Indonesian languages
- HDI (2024): ▲0.857 (4th) very high
- Website: salatiga.go.id

Salatiga (Javanese: ꦯꦭꦠꦶꦒ) is a city in Central Java province, Indonesia. It covers an area of 54.98 km^{2} (21.23 sq mi) and had a population of 192,322 at the 2020 Census; the official estimate as of mid 2025 was 199,906 (comprising 99,065 males and 100,841 females). Located between the cities of Semarang and Surakarta, and administratively an independent city enclaved within Semarang Regency, it sits at the foot of Mount Merbabu (3,142 m (10,308 ft)) and Mount Telomoyo, and has a relatively cool climate due to its elevated position. Salatiga is a part of the Semarang metropolitan area.

== Etymology ==
Plumpungan Inscription

Salatiga is thought to be named either after the goddess of Trisala, or after the three wrongs done to the first king of Semarang.

In the first explanation, the people of the village celebrate the goddess of Siddhadewi, who is mentioned in the Monolith of Plumpungan. Siddhadewi was also called Trisala, so the village was called Trisala and in the years to come became Salatri and eventually Salatiga.

The second explanation is based on the story of Ki Ageng Pandanaran, the first regent of Semarang, who was robbed by three muggers, and he thus named the location Salah Telu. Salah means wrong in both Indonesian and Javanese. Telu is Low Javanese for three, spelled is tiga in both the more refined Middle/High Javanese (but pronounced /tigo/ in Javanese respectively /tiga/ in Indonesian). Hence the name Salatiga from Salah Tiga.

== History ==
The official birth date of Salatiga is 24 July 750 A.D. (the 31st date and 4th year of the Saka calendar). The scroll Monolith of Plumpungan (Prasasti Plumpungan in Sanskrit) by King Bhanu, declares May you be happy! All the people ("Srir = astu swasti prajabhyah") and designated village of Hampran (Desa Hampran) a Perdikan village (Desa Perdikan, meaning a tax-free village). "Çrirastuswasti Prajabyah" is the official motto of Salatiga as written in the government seal.

In 1746, the Dutch East India Company (Vereenigde Oost-Indische Compagnie, VOC) built De Hersteller fort in Salatiga because Salatiga was strategically located at the intersection between Semarang, Surakarta and Magelang.

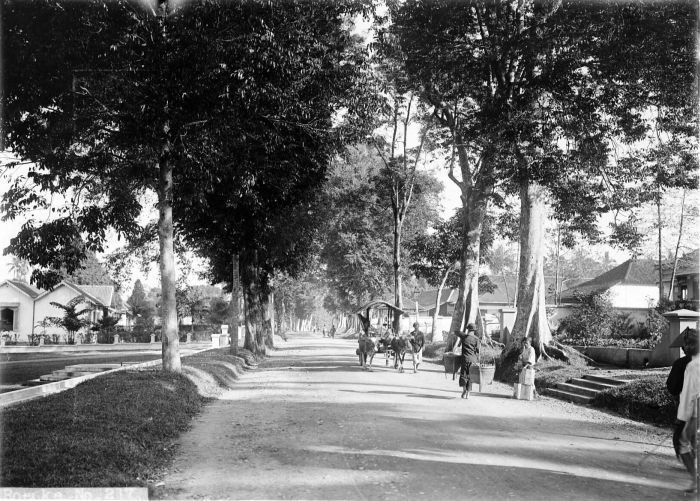
Salatiga street scenery in 1918

On 1 July 1917 the village of Salatiga was designated as a stads gemeente or small town by the Dutch East Indies government. In the colonial era, Salatiga was stratified by race. The Europeans lived near the city centre, at the Toentangscheweg (Toentang Road) leading to Semarang and also near to Dutch plantations in the Salatiga Afdeling. The Chinese were based near the trading centre, the Kalicacing Market, at the Soloscheweg (Solo Road). Native people were bound to live outside the European and Chinese communities. The education system was divided accordingly, with different schools for the Europeans, the Chinese and the natives. Salatiga was led by a burgermeester (mayor), assisted by College van Burgermeester en Wethouders. There was a legislative body, the Stadsgemeenteraad; however, its membership was not proportional, with 8 seats for the Europeans, 1 seat for the Chinese, and only 2 seats for the natives who form the majority of the people. The economy of Salatiga was hampered by the world economic depression of the 1930s. To reduce the city's spending the salaries of government officials were cut by up to 15%. Salatiga had an important economic role as a hinterland to Semarang, providing agricultural products like coffee, rubber, cacao, cotton, spices, tobacco, wheat and vegetables to Semarang to be processed.

Supported by geographical factors, its mostly mild climate and its luxurious buildings with Indies architecture, Salatiga's beauty was well known during the Dutch colonisation, even it was called De Schoonste Stad van Midden-Java (The Most Beautiful City in Central Java).

== Administration ==
Before 1992, Salatiga comprised a single administrative district (kecamatan), the Salatiga District. According to Government Regulation No. 69 of 1992, 13 villages from Semarang Regency were moved into Salatiga, and Salatiga District was dissolved. There are now four districts: Argomulyo, Tingkir, Sidomukti, and Sidorejo. These are tabulated below with their population at the 2010 Census and 2020 Census, together with the official estimates as of mid 2025. The table also includes the locations of the district administrative centes, the number of administrative villages (all classed as urban kelurahan) within each district, and its post codes.

Kode Wilayah	Name of District (kecamatan)	Area in km^{2}	Pop'n Census 2010	Pop'n Census 2020	Pop'n Estimate mid 2025	Admin centre	No. of villages	Post codes
33.73.03	Argomulyo	18.14	40,101	49,295	51,894	Randuacir	6	50732–50736
33.73.02	Tingkir	10.43	39,871	45,971	47,374	Sidorejo Kidul	7	50741–50746
33.73.04	Sidomukti	10.80	38,756	44,237	45,740	Mangunsari	4	50721–50724
33.73.01	Sidorejo	15.61	51,604	52,819	54,898	Sidorejo Lor	6	50711–50716
	Total	54.98	170,332	192,322	199,906	Sidomukti	23	

Bordering Salatiga are the following districts of Semarang Regency:

- To the North: Pabelan (Pabelan and Pejaten villages) and Tuntang (Kesongo and Watu Agung villages)
- To the South: Getasan (Sumogawe, Samirono and Jetak villages) and Tengaran (Patemon and Karang Duren villages)
- To the East: Pabelan (Ujung-ujung, Sukoharjo and Glawan villages) and Tengaran (Bener, Tegalwaton and Nyamat villages)
- To the West: Tuntang (Candirejo, Jombor, Sraten and Gedangan villages) and Getasan (Polobogo village)

All these districts are located in Semarang Regency, making Salatiga an enclave within Semarang Regency.

== Geography ==
Salatiga is located 48 km (30 mi) south of Semarang and 54 km (34 mi) north of Surakarta. Its elevation is between 450–800 metres. Salatiga has a tropical monsoon climate (Am) in the Köppen climate classification with the average rainfall of 2,668 mm (105.0 in) per year, the highest temperature in October (24.1 °C) and the lowest in January (22.4 °C).

Climate data for Salatiga
Month	Jan	Feb	Mar	Apr	May	Jun	Jul	Aug	Sep	Oct	Nov	Dec	Year
Mean daily maximum °C (°F)	26.4 (79.5)	26.6 (79.9)	27.1 (80.8)	27.7 (81.9)	27.8 (82.0)	28.0 (82.4)	28.0 (82.4)	28.7 (83.7)	29.1 (84.4)	29.3 (84.7)	28.0 (82.4)	27.0 (80.6)	27.8 (82.1)
Daily mean °C (°F)	22.4 (72.3)	22.6 (72.7)	22.9 (73.2)	23.3 (73.9)	23.3 (73.9)	23.0 (73.4)	22.6 (72.7)	23.0 (73.4)	23.5 (74.3)	24.1 (75.4)	23.4 (74.1)	22.7 (72.9)	23.1 (73.5)
Mean daily minimum °C (°F)	18.5 (65.3)	18.6 (65.5)	18.8 (65.8)	18.9 (66.0)	18.8 (65.8)	18.0 (64.4)	17.2 (63.0)	17.3 (63.1)	18.0 (64.4)	18.9 (66.0)	18.8 (65.8)	18.5 (65.3)	18.4 (65.0)
Average precipitation mm (inches)	390 (15.4)	344 (13.5)	389 (15.3)	279 (11.0)	204 (8.0)	117 (4.6)	77 (3.0)	52 (2.0)	69 (2.7)	138 (5.4)	264 (10.4)	345 (13.6)	2,668 (104.9)
Source: ClimateData.org

== Demographics ==
Historical population
Year	Pop.	±% p.a.
1900	10,000	—
1905	12,000	+3.71%
1920	18,895	+3.07%
1929	19,192	+0.17%
1930	24,397	+27.12%
1961	58,135	+2.84%
1971	69,184	+1.76%
1980	79,824	+1.60%
1990	98,012	+2.07%
2000	153,036	+4.56%
2010	171,067	+1.12%
2015	183,815	+1.45%
2020	192,322	+0.91%
2024	198,971	+0.85%
Source: 1900–1930, 1961–1971, 1980, 1990, 2000–2010, 2015, 2020

As of 2020, Salatiga had a population of 192,322; 95,025 of them were males and 97,297 were females. The official estimate as at mid 2024 was 198,971 (comprising 98,571 males and 100,400 females).

=== Religion ===
Religion in Salatiga (2019)
1. Islam (79.5%)
2. Protestantism (15.8%)
3. Roman Catholic (4.70%)
4. Other (1.00%)

As of 2019, Islam was the most practised religion in Salatiga (79.5%), followed by Protestantism (15.8%) and Catholicism (4.7%). Other religions (Buddhism, Hinduism, Confucianism and aliran kepercayaan) make up less than 1% of the population. Salatiga is repeatedly called "one of the most tolerant cities in Indonesia" and is one of the few cities in Java to hold outdoor Christian festivals during Christmas.

On Christmas, an event is held where tens of thousands of congregates from 96 churches within the city gather to worship and celebrate Christmas together in Lapangan Pancasila. The main cause for this event is to tighten the relationship between the churches. Even though it is meant to promote a feeling of unity in the Christian community, the service is open to the public for anyone to join, giving Christmas time a more beautiful sentiment.

=== Ethnicity ===
Salatiga is mainly inhabited by the Javanese, with a sizeable minority of Chinese Indonesians and some Bataks from North Sumatra. As a university town, it also hosts an assembly of other ethnicities from as far as Borneo and New Guinea. In total, there are about 30 ethnicities in Salatiga.

== Economy ==
Salatiga's economy rate increased by 22.38% from 2014 to 2016. About 2 billion rupiah from the data collected in 2016.

From lowest to highest divided according to regions, Argomulyo with the lowest economy (Rp 368,741). Sidomukti with Rp 424,301.65, Tingkir with Rp 541,630.14, and the highest, Sidorejo, with Rp 697,593,54.

There is an emerging processing industry that includes textile, tires and animal slaughter in Salatiga. In 2000, this industry contributes Rp. 119.76 billion to the economy of Salatiga. Salatiga is located at the intersection to and from Semarang, Surakarta and Yogyakarta, benefiting its trade sector. In 2000, the trade sector contributes Rp 109 billion to the economy of Salatiga. The following are examples of industries within each category in Salatiga:

- Food
  - PT. Charoen Pokphand
  - PT. Sukasari Mitra Mandiri
  - Cv. Juara Food Industry
  - Perusahaan Abon Abadi SS
- Beverage
  - PT. Kievit Indonesia
  - PT. Adarasa Putra Jaya
  - PT. Globalindo Perkasa
- Building materials
  - PT. Tripilar Beton Mas Salatiga
  - PT. Trikartika Megah Salatiga
- PT. Agric Amarga Jaya (Tobacco Processing)
- PT. Daya Manungal Textiles – Damatex)
- PT. Selalu Cinta Indonesia (Leather or Items of Leather and Footwear)
- PT. Indo Sakura Indah (Polivinyl Products)
- PT. Unza Vitalis (Cosmetics)
- PT. Formulatrix (Computer and Electronic Products)
- PK. Mulyo (Furnitures)

== Cuisine ==
Dishes of the city include Ronde Sekoteng Jago, Tumpang Koyor, Enting enting gepuk, and Keripik Paru.

Ronde Sekoteng Jago is a dessert eaten in Salatiga, made of ginger, sugar, ronde (sticky rice ball filled with crushed peanut), dried fruits, sagu delima (tapioca pearl), kolang-kaling (sugar palm fruit), and seaweed.

Enting enting gepuk is a light food/snack that has peanuts as its main ingredient. Enting Enting Gepuk has a triangular prism shape, and is wrapped in paper. The flavor is sweet and a little savory, with a crunchy and crumbly texture. Tumpang Koyor is made from beef and brisket fat and cooked with various spices.

Keripik Paru is a savory dish eaten as a snack and side dish. It is made from cow's lung that has been thinly sliced then fried in a seasoned flour.

== Government Office ==
Mayor's Office (Kantor Walikota) is located on Jl. Letjen Sukowati No. 74, Salatiga, Jawa Tengah, 50724. Regional House of Representatives Office (Kantor DPRD) is located on Jl. Sukowati No. 51, Kalicacing, Sidomukti, Salatiga, 50724

Courthouse (Kantor Pengadilan) is located on Jl. Veteran No. 6, Ledok, Kec. Argomulyo, Salatiga, Jawa Tengah, 50732.

Class 1B Salatiga Religious Court (Kantor Pengadilan Agama Salatiga Kelas 1B) is located on Jl. Lingkar Selatan, RT.014/RW.005, Jagalan, Cebongan, Kec. Argomulyo, Salatiga, Jawa Tengah, 5073.

Civil Registry Service Office (Kantor Disdukcapil) is located on Jl. Pemuda No. 2, Salatiga. The role of the Service Office is to assist the Mayor in the performance of government affairs under the jurisdiction of the city in the field of population administration and civil registration, as well as in the tasks of assistance assigned to the region. Following is the contact info: Ph. (0298) 312650, Email: disdukcapil@salatiga.go.id.

Education Office (Kantor Dinas Pendidikan) is located on Jl. LMU Adisucipto No. 2, Salatiga. Following is the contact info: Ph. (0298) 324979, Fax. (0298) 324844.

Public Health Office (Kantor Dinas Kesehatan) is located on Jl. Hasanudin No. 110 A, Mangunsari, Sidomukti, Salatiga, Jawa Tengah, 50721 The role of the Service Office is to assist the Mayor in the performance of government affairs which fall under the health authority of the Region and to assist the tasks assigned to the Region in the area of health.

Youth and Sports Office (Kantor Dinas Kepemudaan dan Olahraga) is located on Jl. LMU Adi Sucipto No. 2 (Gor Pelajar Hati Beriman), Salatiga, 50711.

Department of Tourism and Culture (Kantor Dinas Kebudayaan dan Pariwisata) is located on Jl. Diponegoro No.37, Salatiga, Sidorejo, Kec. Sidorejo. The Office of Culture and Tourism is responsible for carrying out the governmental affairs of the city of Salatiga in the cultural and tourism sector on the basis of the concept of regional autonomy. They have the authority to grant permits relating to cultural fields, such as cultural events, the conversion of historic buildings and others. Following is the contact info: Ph. (0298) 3432437.

Transportation Service Office (Kantor Dinas Perhubungan) is located on Jl. Magersari No.166, Tegalrejo, Kec. Argomulyo, Salatiga, 50724.

Women's Empowerment and Child Safety Office (Kantor Dinas Pemberdayaan Perempuan dan Perlindungan Anak) is located on Jl. Hasanudin No. 114 B Salatiga.

Office of Manpower (Kantor Dinas Tenaga Kerja) is located on Jl. Ki Penjawi No.12a, Sidorejo Lor, Sidorejo, Salatiga, 50714.

Communication and Information Technology Office (Kantor Dinas Komunikasi dan Informatika) is located on Letjend., Jl. Sukowati No.51, Kalicacing, Sidomukti, Salatiga, 50724.

== Infrastructure ==
=== Transport ===
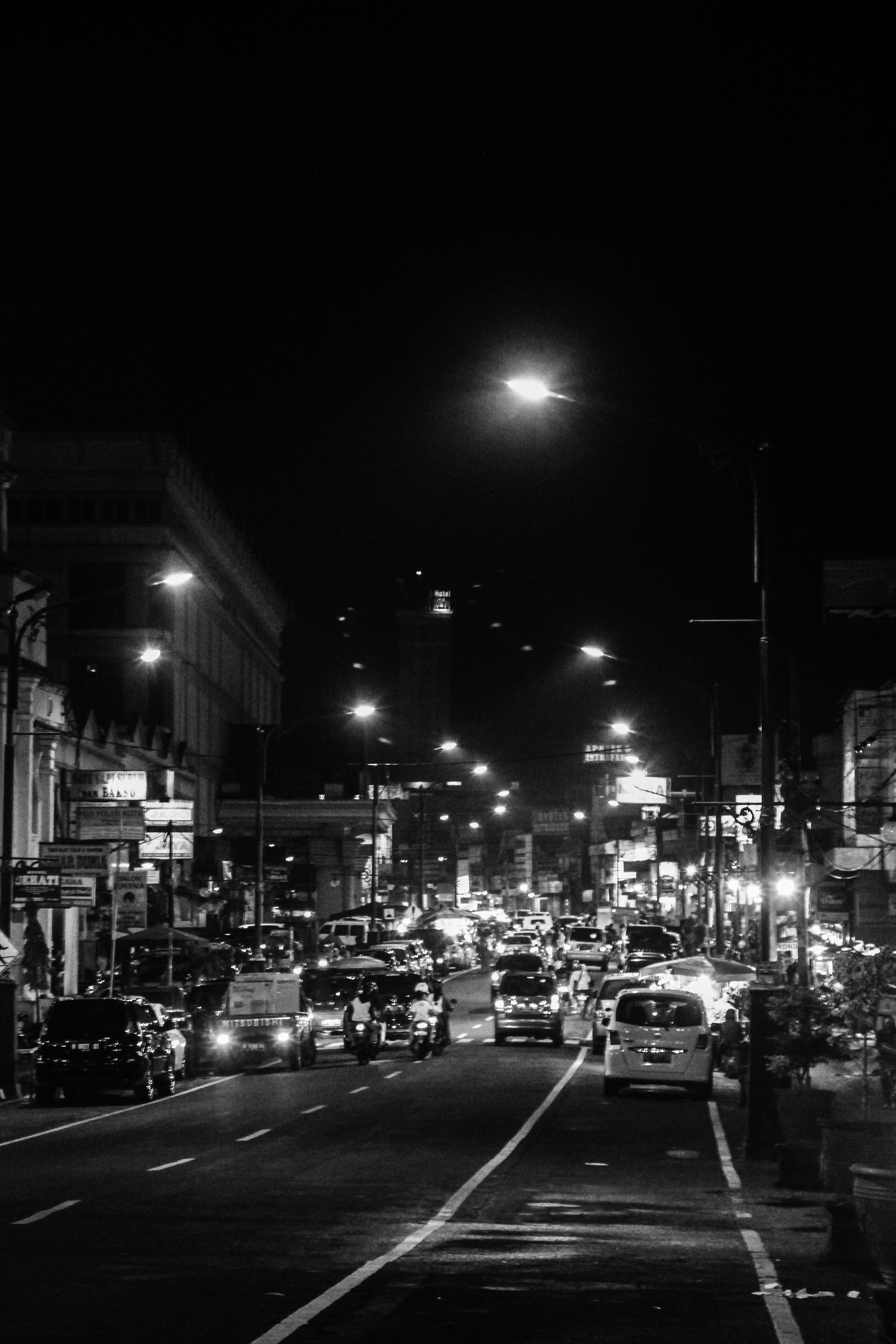
The main road of Salatiga, Jalan Jendral Sudirman

Salatiga is traversed by provincial road that connects Semarang and Surakarta. Tingkir Terminal is the main bus station in Salatiga, serving intercity buses. The Tamansari Terminal serves angkot (share taxis), even though most of the angkot did not stop at the terminal. The Semarang–Solo Toll Road section Bawen-Salatiga was inaugurated on 25 September 2017. As of May 2026, a toll road had begun construction at Pattimura Street, closer to the city centre than the previous junction.

=== Angkot ===
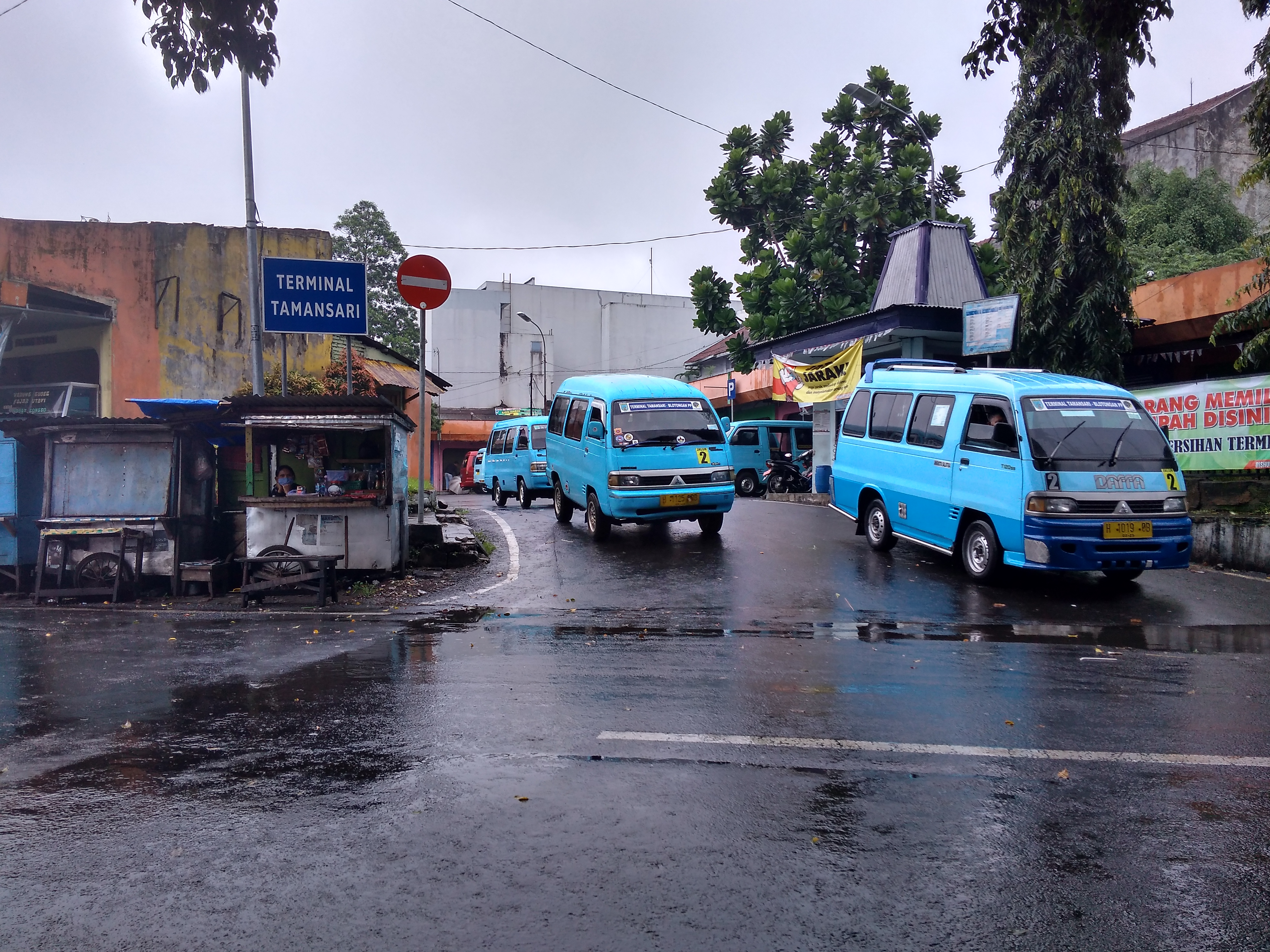
Tamansari Angkot Terminal in Salatiga

As a small city between Solo and Semarang. Salatiga has adequate transportation facilities. With an area of approximately 56,781 km^{2} (21,923 sq mi), Salatiga has 423 units (updated 24 May 2016) of urban transportation (angkot). Angkot in the City of Salatiga is divided into 15 different routes which are centered in front of Ramayana Salatiga, Tamansari. These 15 routes have been able to cover all areas in Salatiga.

=== Bus ===
Salatiga has three bus terminals

1. Terminal Tingkir which serves buses for AKDP Central Java and AKAP Central Java, such as Jakarta, Denpasar, Bali.
2. Terminal Tamansari which serves the inner city route.
3. Pasar Sapi Terminal which serves the Upper Salatiga area (Getasan, Kopeng, Ngablak, and Magelang city).

For inter-city transportation, Salatiga has city buses Esto, Sawojajar, Konco Narimo, Tunas Mulya, Safari, Galaksi Taxi and Matra Taxi with destinations around the city of Salatiga.

=== Ring Road ===
Jalan Linkar Selatan Salatiga (Salatiga's Ring Road) runs from the northwestern end of the city to the southeastern end. It runs 11.3 km (7.0 mi) long in an arc around the southwestern edge of the city. Jalan Lingkar Selatan Salatiga was planned in 1994 and was finalized in 1999. Construction only began in 2005 and was completed in 2016.

=== Water supply ===
Clean water is supplied by PDAM Salatiga. The water comes from Kaliombo, Senjoyo, Kali Golek Senjoyo, and Kaligetak water springs.

== Hospitals ==
The Salatiga Regional Public Hospital (RSUD) operates for public use. It is located at Jl. Osamaliki No. 19 in Sidomukti, Salatiga.

This being a Type B hospital, it provides facilities such as general medical services, emergency services, basic specialist medical services, medical support specialist services, other specialist medical services, oral dental specialist medical services, subspecialty medical services, nursing and midwifery services, clinical support services, and non-clinical support services.

The Dr. Asmir Hospital is a military hospital that operates for public use as well as for military personnel. It is located at Jl. Dr. Muwardi No. 50 Salatiga, though it used to operate at a different location, and was moved to its current location in 1967 at the request of the local government.

This being a Type C hospital, it provides general medical services, emergency services, basic medical specialists, medical support specialists, oral dental specialists, nursing and midwifery, as well as clinical and non-clinical support services.

The Salatiga Puri Asih Hospital operates for public use. It is located at Jl. Jend. Sudirman No.169, Gendongan, Salatiga. This is a Type C hospital.

The Pulmonary (Lung) Hospital by Dr.Ario Wirawan is located at Jl.Hasanuddin No.806, Salatiga. Dr Ario Wirawan Hospital was used as a referral hospital during the COVID-19 pandemic. This is a class A hospital that has been established since 1934. It is now owned by the Ministry of Health of the Republic of Indonesia.

RSIA Hermina Mutiara Bunda is located at Jl.Merak No.8, Sidomukti, Salatiga. It was founded in 2004 by Dr. Robby Hernawan, Sp. OG (K) dan Dr. Hj. Emilia Pratiwi. In 2012, Mutiara Bunda Maternity Hospital developed into a Maternity Hospital and, in the same year, they received national accreditation certification as a class C hospital.

== Education ==
=== Tertiary education ===
Salatiga has several universities and colleges:

- Satya Wacana Christian University (UKSW), the largest university in Salatiga with 14 Faculties and 3 Doctoral studies, and 14,000 students and 300 faculty members. It was founded in 1956.
- State Institute for Islamic Studies Salatiga (IAIN Salatiga), an Islamic College specialising in Education. Now, the largest High Education Institution in Salatiga, which is accept up to 10,000 students per year with Five Faculty (Fakultas Tarbiyah dan Ilmu Keguruan, Fakultas Ekonomi dan Bisnis Islam, Fakultas Syariah, Fakultas Dakwah, Fakultas Ushluhuddin, Adab dan Humaniora dan Sekolah Pascasarjana). Let's join us, Spirituality, Intellectuality, Professionalism
- Sekolah Tinggi Ilmu Ekonomi (STIE AMA), a private college specialising in Economics
- There are some Sekolah Tinggi Teologi (College of Christian Theology) in Salatiga such as STT Salatiga, STT Sangkakala, STT Efata, STT Berea, STT Nusantara, and The Theological Faculty of Satya Wacana Christian University (UKSW). The latter is one of the best theological schools in the nation, as it has been A-accredited by the National Accreditation Agency for Higher Education (BAN-PT).

=== Schools ===
There are 96 elementary schools, 27 junior high schools, 33 senior high schools, and 19 vocational schools in Salatiga. Schools in Salatiga are normally affiliated with the government, universities, or religious institutions. In the past, state-run schools are generally sought after for their quality and subsidised cost however this had changed significantly. Students also generally compete by using final examination grades and written examinations to enter the more popular schools.

Salatiga has one international English-speaking school at elementary and secondary level (Mountainview International Christian School).

==== Public Schools ====
SMANSSA Salatiga is one of three public senior highschools in Salatiga. It is located at Jl. Kemiri No. 1, Salatiga. This school has become the choice of many students aiming to enroll in both public and private universities in various regions of Indonesia, such as UI, UGM, ITB, IPB, Undip, ITS, UNS and so on.

SMP Negeri 4 Salatiga is one of the first public junior highschools in Salatiga that is an A accredited school. SMP Negeri 4 is more commonly known as Nepatsa. It is located at Jl. Patimura No. 47 Salatiga.

SMK Negeri 3 Salatiga is a highschool that uses the SMK curriculum. It is located at Jl. Jafar Shodiq, Tingkir, Salatiga and was founded on 21 May 2007 in agreement with the government of Salatiga. At first, the highschool was called SMK Negeri 1 but on 20 July 2007 its name was officially changed to SMK Negeri 3 Salatiga.

==== Private Homeschools ====
Destiny Institute is a school that uses a homeschool curriculum, as well as being a private school.

==== Private Schools ====
Mountainview Christian School Salatiga is an Indonesian international school that provides Christian education for the children of Christian missionary families.

It is well known for its sports programs and events, and provides boarding programs for students to live in dormitories during the school year. It is possible for both international and students living and originating within the country to enroll.

Jungle School is an Indonesian, privately owned experimental school, accepting students ranging from the ages 2 to Elementary-aged students. It is located at Jl. Setiaki, Sidomukti, Salatiga.

It is an English-speaking school that currently provides non-formal education for children from over 15 countries, including Indonesian residents, and is accepting more. It is well known for providing facilities without electricity, and integrating education into a natural environment for the students to learn in and about.

SMA Kristen Satya Wacana is a private school located at Jl. Diponegorono 52–60, in the city of Salatiga, founded by Willi Toisuta Ph.D., who was then the UKSW Rector. It is more commonly known as Lab School.

It implements the 2013 curriculum, which provides programs such as specialization in math and natural sciences, social sciences, language and culture, as well as sports programs.

SMA Kristen 1 Salatiga was founded on 1 June 1951 by PPKJTU (Perkumpulan Perguruan Kristen Jawa Tengah Utara). SMA Kristen 1 Salatiga is located at Mangunsari, Sidomukti, Salatiga City, Central Java 50721. The current headmaster of SMA Kristen 1 Salatiga, as of the year 2021, is Dra. Kriswinarti.

== Sports Centres ==
Lapangan Kridanggo Salatiga is a local stadium that is located near RSUD Salatiga at Jl. Stadion, Sidomukti. It was first renovated in 2005, then in 2015, and most recently in 2018 until now. Lapangan Kridanggo has an impressive view of Mount Merbabu, Telomoyo, and Merapi. One of Indonesia's football legends, Bambang Pamungkas, had trained at Lapangan Kridanggo Salatiga.

Lapangan Tenis Kridanggo is an indoor court. It is located at Jl. Stadion, Sidomukti, Salatiga. It was once used by KONI (National Sports Committee of Indonesia) for a tournament that hosted visitors from various other cities.

Lapangan Pancasila Salatiga is a tourist attraction. It is located at Jl. Ahmad Yani no. 100, Kalicacing, Salatiga. It is used by many locals to exercise in. Locals usually use Lapangan Pancasila for a daily exercise, such as jogging, calisthenics, etc.. There are some exercise facilities that are available for public use.

Arena Futsal Centre is a local futsal place located at Jl. Cemara Raya no. 838, Salatiga. It opens at 8am to 9pm throughout the week.

Muncul is a swimming pool that sources its water from a natural spring in Mt. Telomoyo. It is located near Bukit Cinta, Banyubiru. The water is kept very cold and refreshing. It has become a tourist destination for some, and for most, it is used by people from Ungaran, Salatiga and even Semarang for a daily swim. The entry ticket is 5,000 Rupiah as of March 2021.

The Kalitaman Swimming Pool is an affordable pay-to-enter swimming area for general use. It is located at Jl. Kalitaman No.3, Kutowinangun Kidul, Salatiga. It provides a clean swimming area with one uniqueness that allows for clean freshwater to pump in from the holes in the bottom of the pool. It has other facilities such as a canteen, and has hosted many sporting events such as Porseni, Popda, and Salatiga Cup.

This pool's history dates back to the Dutch colonial area in 1927, when it was built as a bathing area, though it was only for the use of the Dutch residents who lived nearby, where it was then reclaimed by the Salatiga Local Water Company as a public swimming pool in 2005.

== Tourism ==
=== Saloka ===
Saloka theme park, with an area of 15 ha (37 acres), is the largest theme park at Central Java located a mere 2.3 km (1.4 mi) from the border of Salatiga. This amusement park has 25 rides with the theme of the legend of the people of Central Java. Alongside recreational tourism, Saloka theme park also provides educational tourism with their indoor science museum.

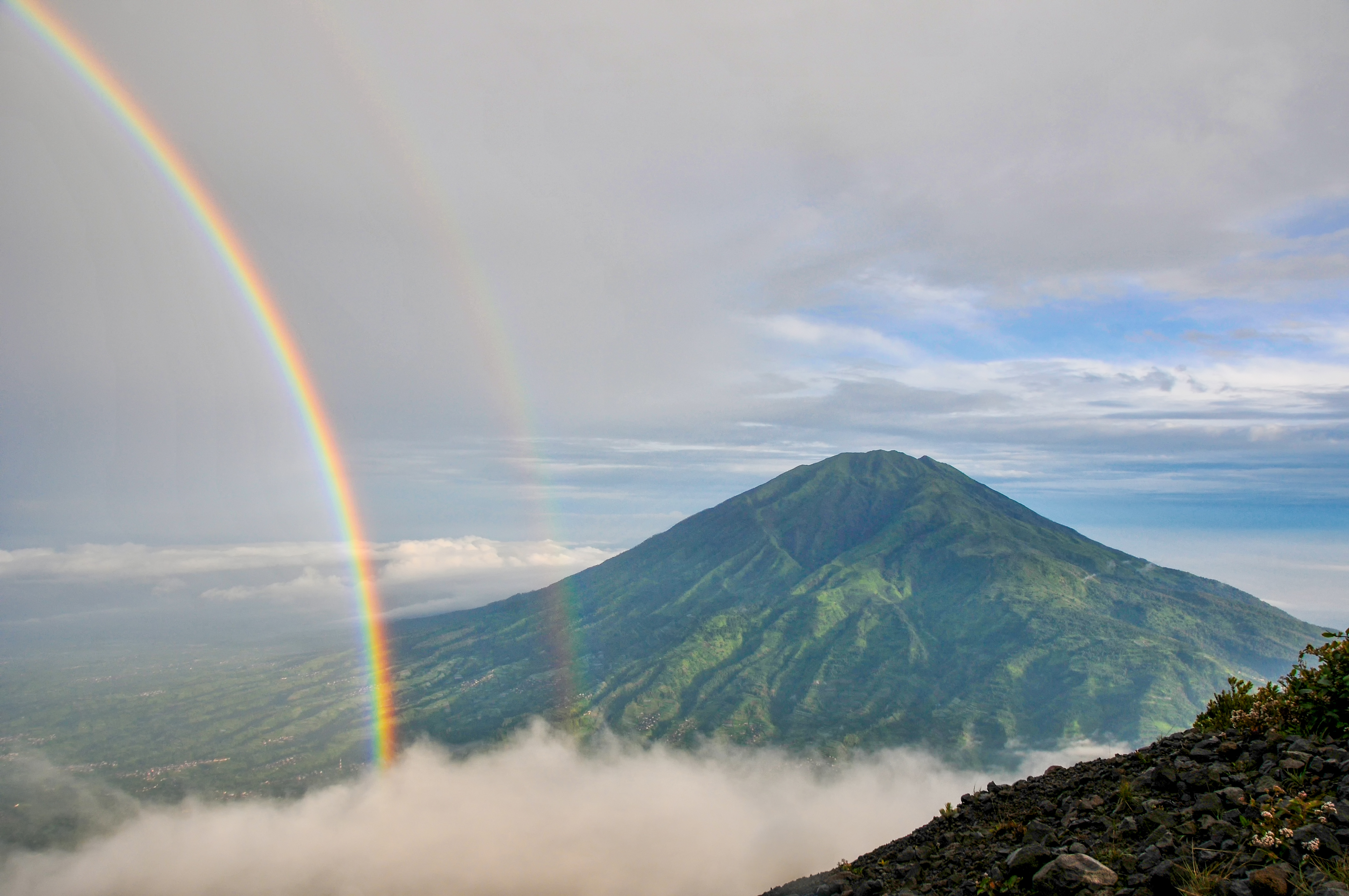
Mt. Merbabu

=== Mt. Merbabu ===
Mount Merbabu is part of the district areas of Magelang, Boyolali and Semarang. There are 5 hiking routes to this mountain. One of the bases, is Basecamp Chuntel in Kopeng, Salatiga. From this base, the route trails through steep and extreme landscaping with the final destination arriving at the northern side of Mount Merbabu.

=== Kopeng Treetop Adventure Park ===
Kopeng Treetop Adventure Park is a tourist attraction set in nature. This recreational park is located in the woods at the foot of Merbabu Mountain and has become a popular attraction for families who wish to spend their weekends or holidays with a refreshing activity in nature.

=== Arts and Festivals ===
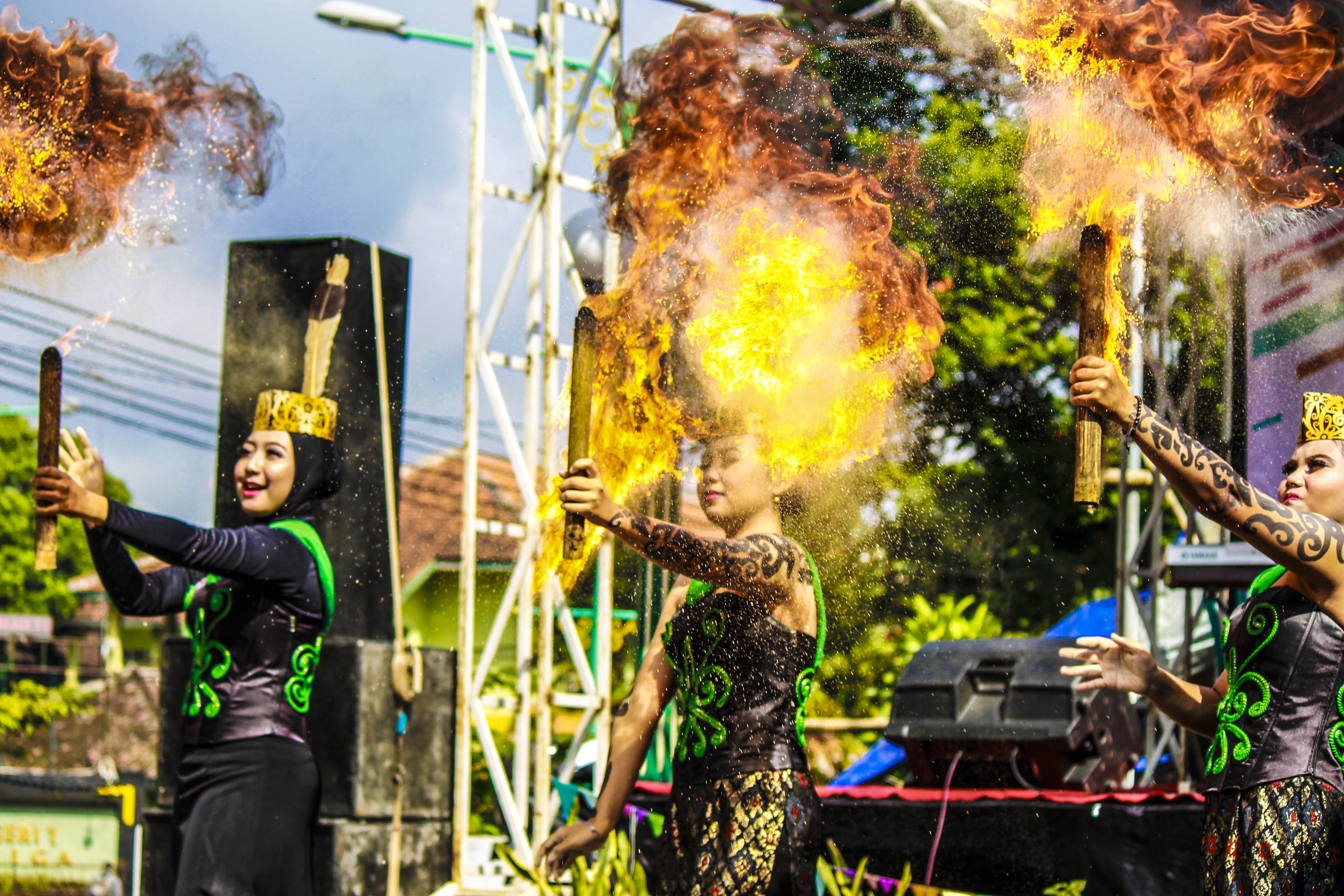
Culture Festival at Satya Wacana Christian University

==== Indonesian International Culture Festival (IICF) ====
A parade (organized by UKSW, a local university) dubbed as the Indonesian International Culture Festival, or IICF, is held annually in mid-April, where marchers dress in distinct, traditional clothing to represent different tribes and ethnicities. The parade follows a chosen theme for that particular year, often with strong tones of nationalism and unity in the differences notably between the more than a thousand tribes.

==== Drumblek ====
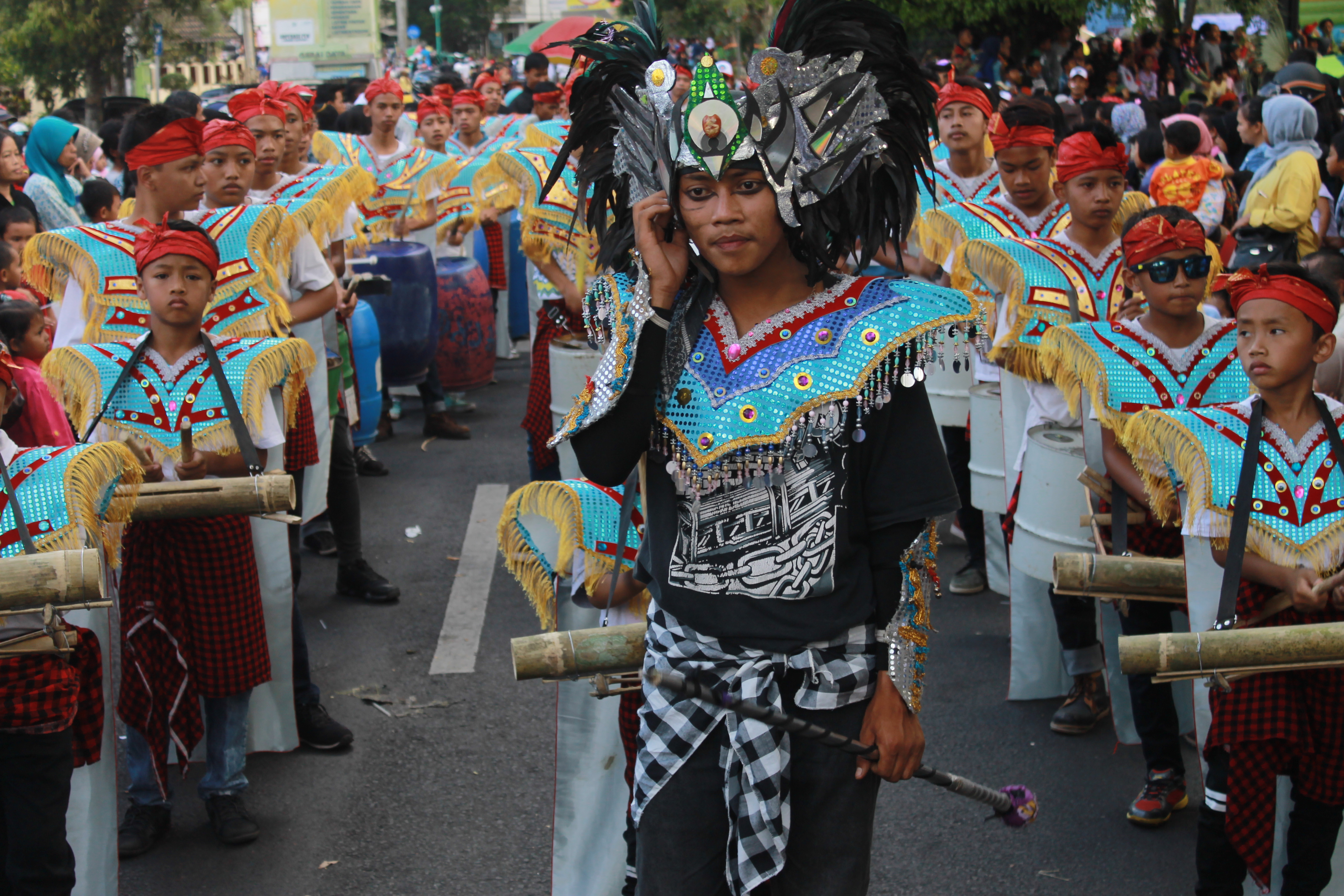
Drumblek

The parade marches their route throughout the city, announcing their presence with music played by a Drumblek, which is a traditional drum band originated in Salatiga. This form of cultural music is played from repurposed materials such as barrels. It was pioneered by the artist Didik Subiantoro Masruri in 1986. This particular band style based on recycled items was a result of the lack of funds in celebration of Indonesia's Independence Day.

==== Chinese New Year ====
Chinese New Year is a festive time in Salatiga. On the fifteenth and last day of celebration, also called Cap Go Meh, can be witnessed a compelling performance of a large dragon puppet, the Barongsai. This puppet is usually played by two or more people, performing an entrancing Chinese traditional dance at Klenteng Hok Tek Bio and along Sukowati street, where the temple is located. On this special day, civilians gather around the temple where a big celebration filled with performances is held and angpao (red envelope) is given out.

==== Mural Village ====
Murals are found all over the city. The catalysts range from groups of 15 artists to underground, solo artists. The murals often carry a message, and are viewed by both locals and tourists. One village, Pancuran, is entirely painted in art and is known as the “Mural Village”.

==== Festival Mata Air ====
In 2005, a group of local artworkers in Salatiga formed a community, Tanam Untuk Kehidupan (“Planting for Life”). In 2006, the community organized a three-day festival with the intention of raising awareness of environmental and especially water issues through cleaning programs and re-utilizing the garbage into hand-crafted arts. This festival, named “Festival Mata Air” (“Spring Festival”), was held annually, the first festival in November 2006. The last festival was held in 2016, at a spring in Muncul, where a team of 170 people retrieved a staggering 1,800 kilograms of trash which was later repurposed.

==== Salatiga 'How Art you' ====
Salatiga “How Art You” is a community fest held for enthusiasts to share their appreciation for arts, theaters, dances, and visuals, as well as introducing these arts to a public audience through performances, and to provide young, rising artists a space to develop their talents and love of art. The event has been held annually since 2015 in the form of an exhibition, where artists are welcome to sell their works to the visitors. The last festival was held in 2019 at the mayor's official residence (Rumah Dinas Walikota Salatiga).

== Landmarks ==
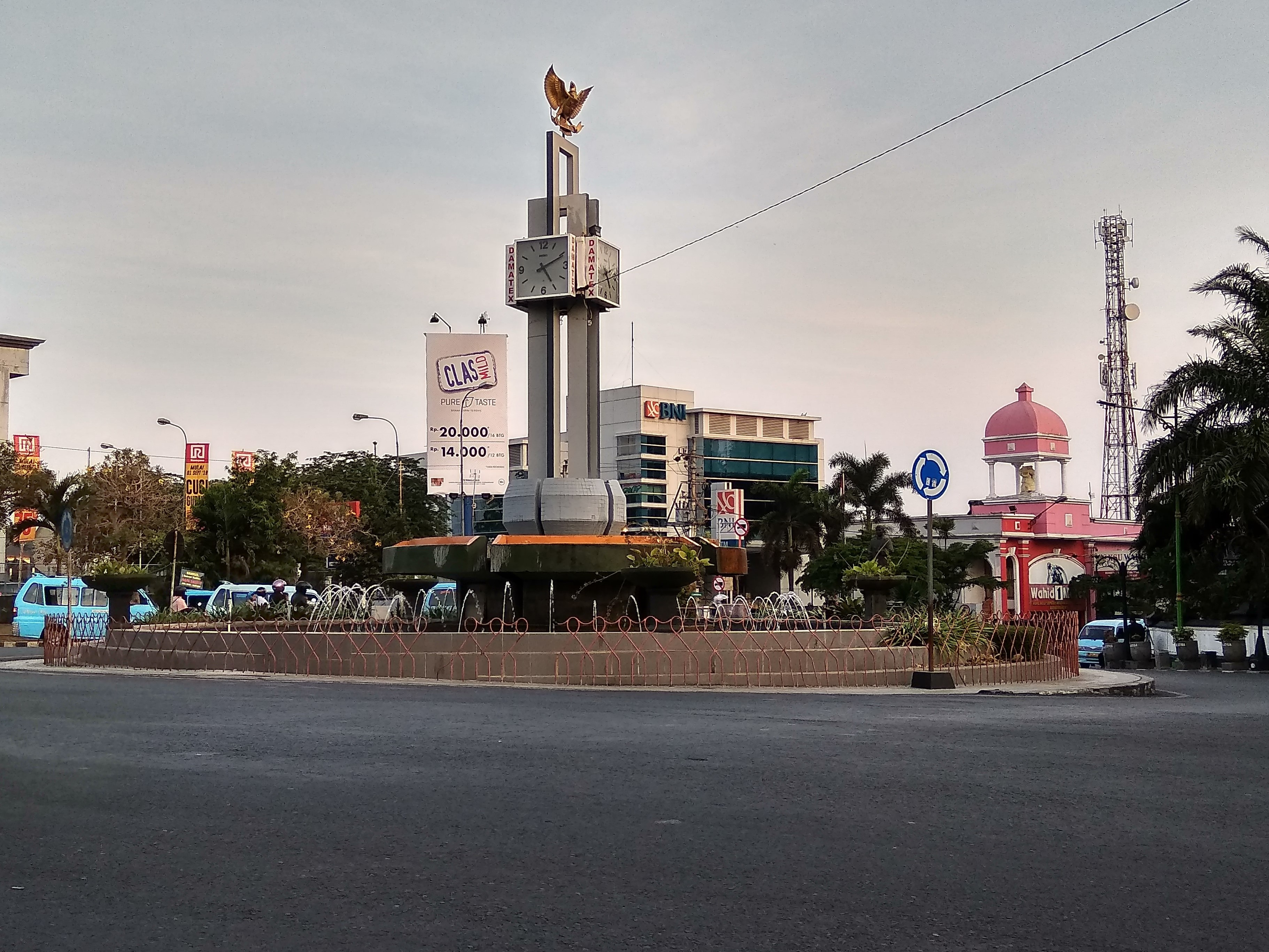
Tugu Jam Tamansari

=== Tugu Jam Tamansari ===
Tugu Jam Tamansari is a historical monument, a clock, that has been known as the central point of the city of Salatiga since colonial times. Unto this day, the monument remains the center of the downtown area of Salatiga and has become an important landmark for the reason of its historical background.

=== Pancasila Park ===
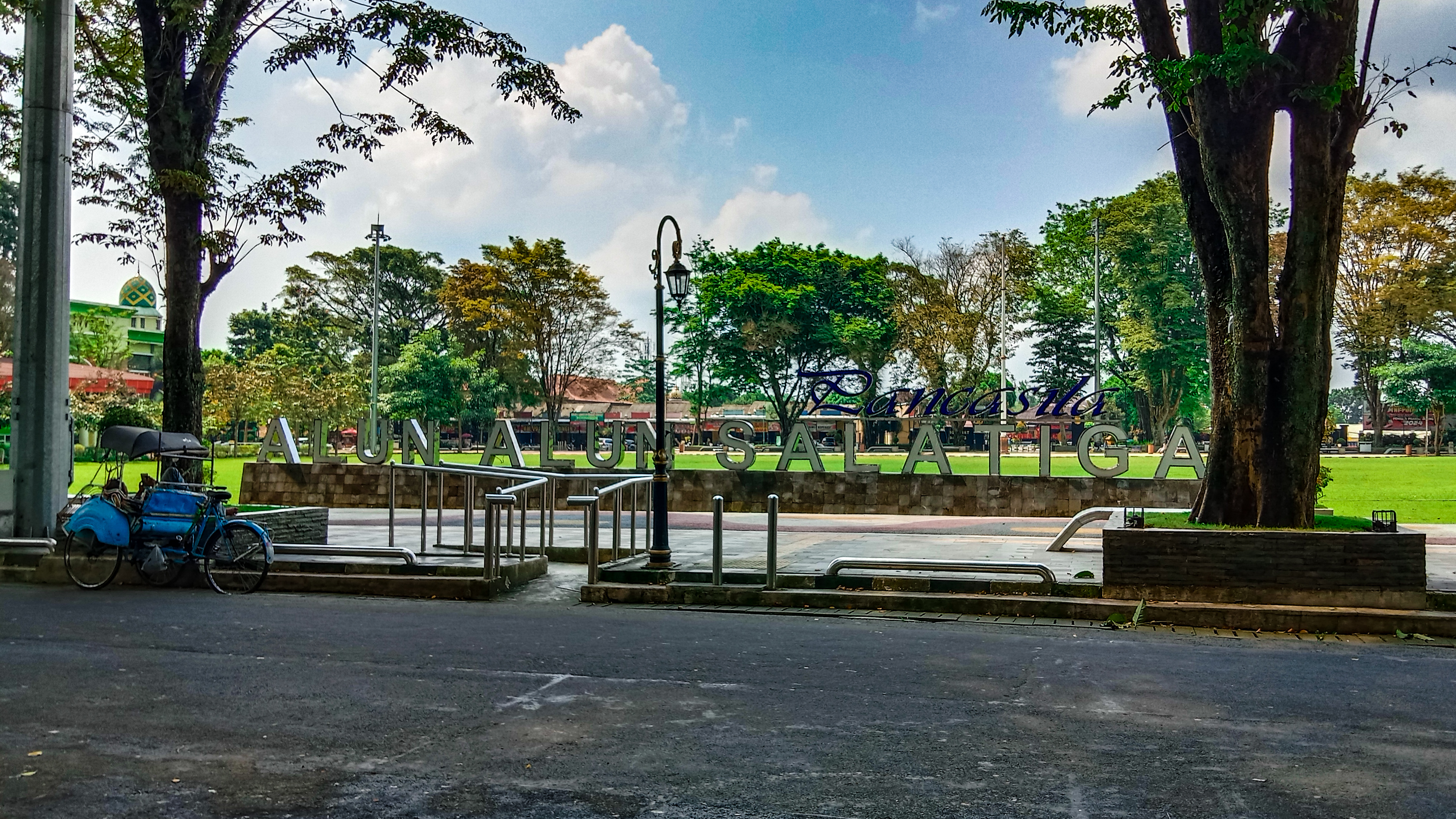
Alun Alun Pancasila

Alun Alun Pancasila is a city park that has been around for a long time. It is a favorite choice of destination for local civilians to spend their leisure time. In the park is a monument with statues of the three national heroes of Indonesia who were born in the city of Salatiga: Brigadier General Sudiarto, Admiral Madya Yosaphat Soedarso, and Marshal Muda Agustinus Adisucipto.

== Architecture ==
Salatiga is a small town that connects Semarang and Solo. Thus, Salatiga provided a lot of the infrastructure as a resting point for the Dutch. During the Dutch Colonial era, Salatiga was considered as De schoonste stad van Midden Java, which translates to,“The Most Beautiful Town in Middle Java,“ in Dutch. There's a few building from Dutch Colonial Era like Bus stop, Salatiga Mayor's Office, and The building of Korem Makutarama Salatiga. Some of the buildings mentioned still stand until today.

== Gallery ==
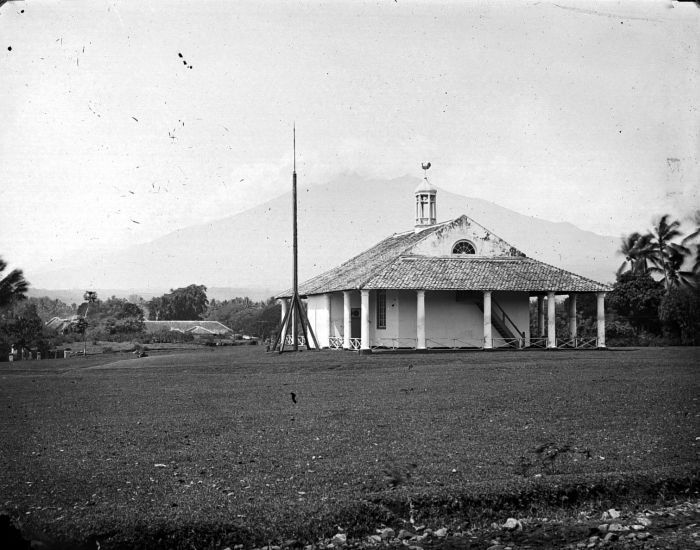
Church in Salatiga

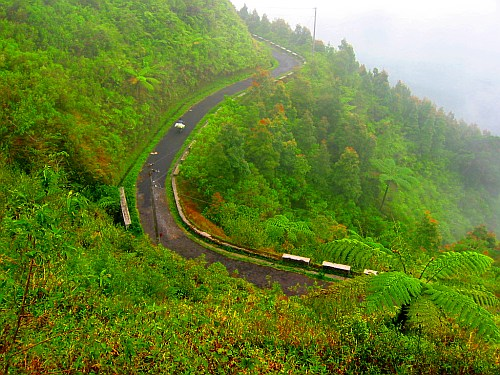
Mount Telomoyo

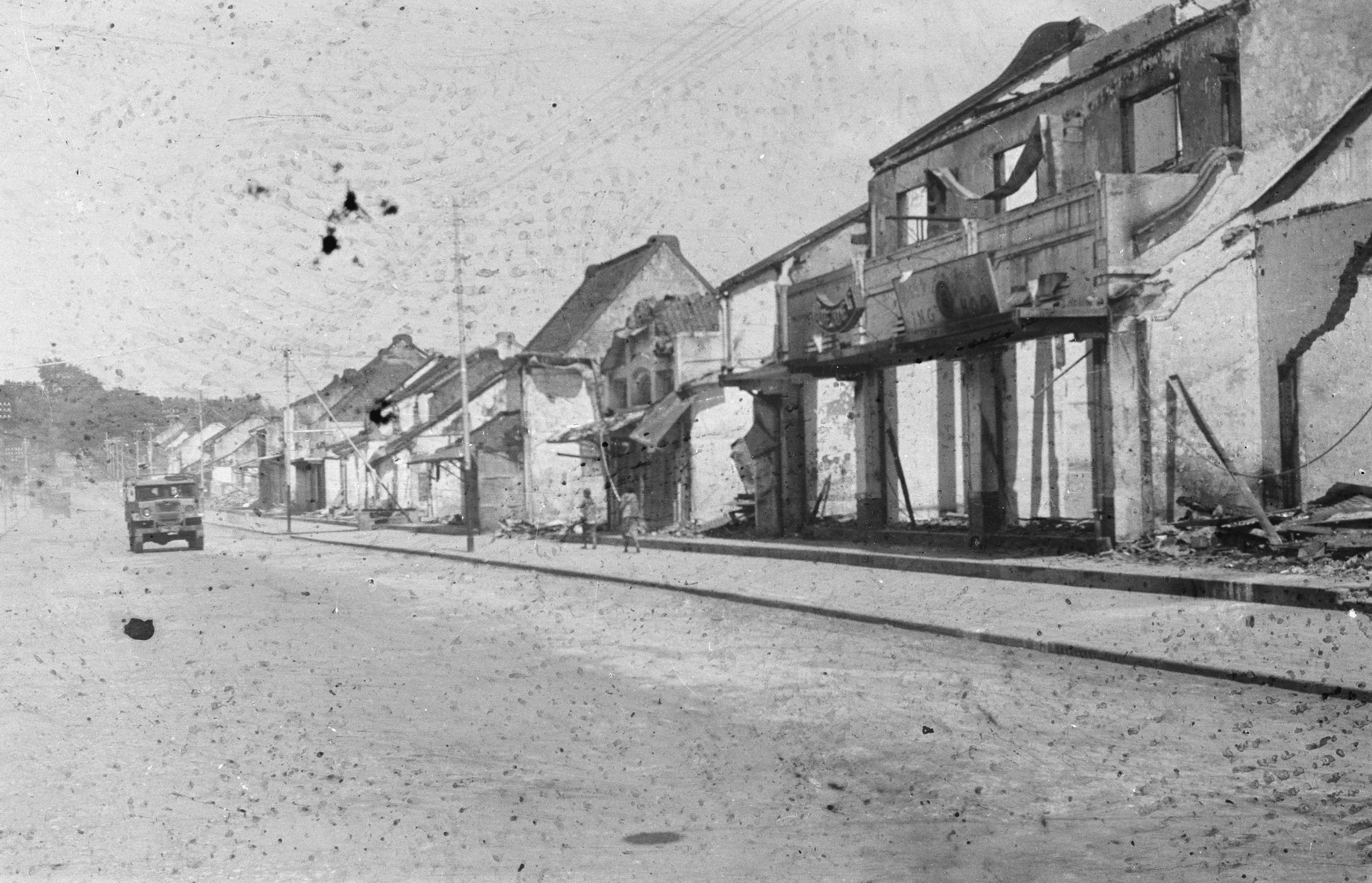
Salatiga during the National Revolution Era.

== Cited works ==
- Maharani, Lutvia (2009). Pengambilalihan Kota Salatiga dari Kekuasaan Belanda ke Pemerintah Republik Indonesia Tahun 1945-1950 [Takeover of Salatiga City from the Dutch to the Government of the Republic of Indonesia in 1945-1950] (PDF) (Thesis) (in Indonesian). State University of Semarang. Archived (PDF) from the original on 28 December 2016.
- Statistics of Salatiga Municipality (2016). Kota Salatiga dalam Angka 2016 [Salatiga Municipality in Figures 2016] (PDF) (in Indonesian). Statistics of Salatiga Municipality. ISSN 2355-3065. Archived from the original (PDF) on 4 April 2017.
- Surtiani, Eny Endang (2006). Faktor-Faktor yang Mempengaruhi Terciptanya Kawasan Permukiman Kumuh di Kawasan Pusat Kota (Studi Kasus: Kawasan Pancuran, Salatiga) [Factors that Influence the Formation of Slum in the City Centre (Case Study: Pancuran Region, Salatiga)] (PDF) (Thesis) (in Indonesian). Diponegoro University. Archived (PDF) from the original on 15 February 2017.
