= Irish Caribbean people =

Ethnic group in the Caribbean region

Irish Caribbean people are people who live in the Caribbean, but were born in Ireland, or are descended from people who were born in Ireland.

Irish Caribbean people include Irish immigrants to Barbados, Irish immigrants to Saint Kitts and Nevis, Irish people in Jamaica, Irish immigrants to Antigua and Barbuda, Irish immigrants to Bermuda, Irish immigrants to Montserrat, and Irish immigrants to Trinidad and Tobago.

== Economic context ==
In 1620, Indentured Servitude was introduced into the Americas as an economic system based on production through cultivation. This system allowed landowners to purchase physical laborer's work for a determined amount of time in order to cultivate the fields. Indentured servitude was originally a means to solve supply deficiency in different colonial regions.

At the start of the 18th century, the Irish along with other countries joined the migration trends towards the West Indies. They migrated into the colonies as indentured servants during a time when transportation costs varied little and the length of their contract terms were influenced by their productivity as it decreased the time it would take to repay the implicit loans. Remaining contract terms could also be sold and traded between landowners at the time.

Irish indentured servants (like all other servants) were classified by two main categories. The first category would place them in either "skilled" or "unskilled" classes. The second category would order the servants based on age. Both categories together would define their wages as younger and skilled servants could gain more and pay back their loans faster. This meant that their age and their capabilities were direct factors determining the contract term period. A skilled male servant with a mean age of 22.9 years would gain a mean net annual earning of 5.78 pounds while a male servant with a mean age of 19.1 would only gain 2.0.

In 1740, A migration trend of African slaves caused by market forces started taking place and grew in popularity due to the very low cost of purchase. Indentured servants (such as the Irish) served as a training ground. Planters learned the necessary knowledge and skills needed and then shifted to African slaves. Slaves were unskilled laborers who could work the fields for cheaper while indentured servants could perform skilled crafts and even manage the slaves. Over time production grew and Indentured servants became too expensive which led to Irish skilled laborers to be replaced by trained African skilled laborers. By the 19th century, indentured servitude (though still present) was done at a much smaller scale and was very limited.

Today, Irish influence can be seen through Caribbean islands, mainly Montserrat. A small island with inhabitants that celebrates St-Patrick's day every year. Inhabitants with surnames such as Meade, O'Brien and Riley can be found within the residents of that island. Even the traditional costumes that were worn during the plantation are present in modern times along with the traditional tartan.

== See also ==
- White Caribbean people
- Redleg
- Irish indentured servants
- Irish slaves myth
- Irish immigration to Barbados
- Irish immigration to Saint Kitts and Nevis
- Irish immigration to Montserrat
- Irish people in Jamaica
