= Irish diaspora =

Irish people and their descendants living outside Ireland

Countries with a significant population of Irish nationals and eligible descendants. Republic of Ireland and Northern Ireland + 1,000,000 + 100,000 + 10,000 + 1,000

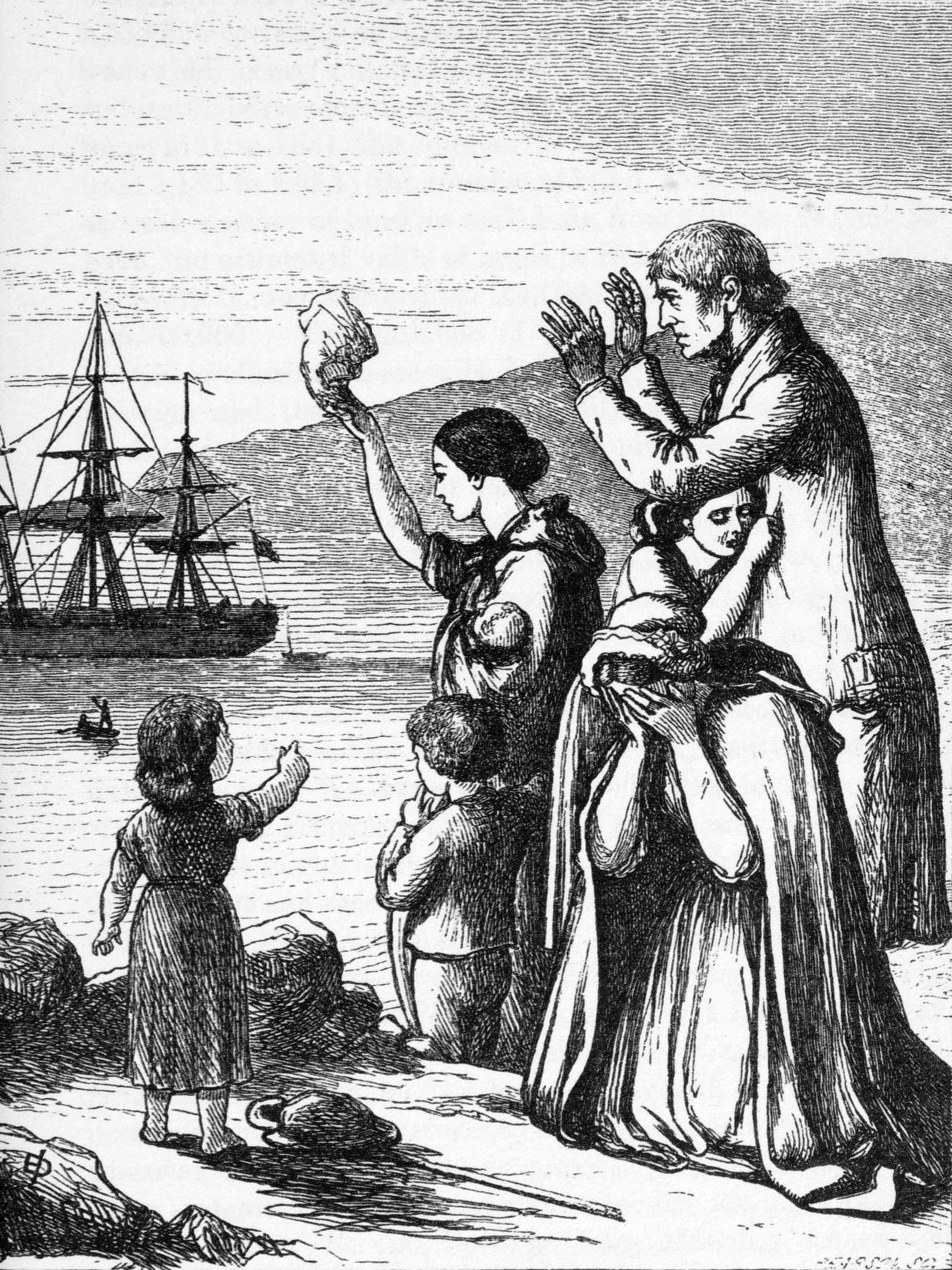
'Emigrants Leave Ireland', engraving by Henry Doyle (1827–1892), from Mary Frances Cusack's Illustrated History of Ireland, 1868

The Irish diaspora (Irish: Diaspóra na nGael) refers to ethnic Irish people and their descendants who live outside the island of Ireland.

The phenomenon of migration from Ireland is recorded since the Early Middle Ages, but it can be quantified only from around 1700. Since then, between 9 and 10 million people born in Ireland have emigrated. That is more than the population of Ireland itself, which at its historical peak was 8.5 million on the eve of the Great Famine. The poorest of them went to Great Britain, especially Liverpool. Those who could afford it went further, including almost 5 million to the United States.

After 1765, emigration from Ireland became a short, relentless and efficiently managed national enterprise. In 1890, 40% of Irish-born people were living abroad. By the 21st century, an estimated 80 million people worldwide claimed some Irish descent, which includes more than 36 million Americans claiming Irish as their primary ethnicity.

As recently as the second half of the 19th century, most Irish emigrants spoke Irish as their first language. That had social and cultural consequences for the cultivation of the language abroad, including innovations in journalism. The language continues to be cultivated abroad by a small minority as a literary and social medium. The Irish diaspora are largely assimilated in most countries outside Ireland after World War I. Seán Fleming is the Republic of Ireland's Minister of State for the Diaspora and Overseas Aid, a post which was established in 2014.

== Definition ==
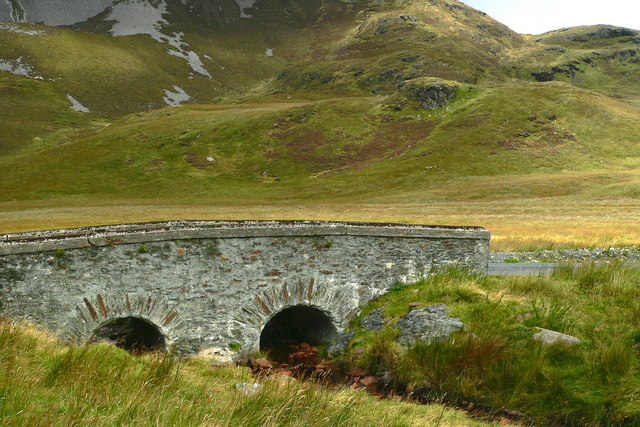
The Bridge of Tears (Irish: Droichead na nDeor) in West Donegal, Ireland. Family and friends of emigrants would accompany them as far as the bridge before saying goodbye, while the emigrants would continue on to Derry Port.

The term Irish diaspora is open to many interpretations. The diaspora, broadly interpreted, contains all those known to have Irish ancestors, i.e., over 100 million people, which is more than fifteen times the population of the island of Ireland, which was about 6.4 million in 2011. It has been argued the idea of an Irish diaspora, as distinct from the old identification of Irishness with Ireland itself, was influenced by the perceived advent of global mobility and modernity. Irishness could now be identified with dispersed individuals and groups of Irish descent. But many of those individuals were the product of complex ethnic intermarriage in America and elsewhere, complicating the idea of a single line of descent. "Irishness" might then rely primarily on individual identification with an Irish diaspora.

The Government of Ireland defines the Irish diaspora as all persons of Irish nationality who habitually reside outside the island of Ireland. This includes Irish citizens who have emigrated abroad and their children, who are Irish citizens by descent under Irish law. It also includes their grandchildren in cases where they were registered as Irish citizens in the Foreign Births Register held in every Irish diplomatic mission. Under this legal definition, the Irish diaspora is considerably smaller—some 3 million persons, of whom 1.47 million are Irish-born emigrants. Given the island of Ireland's estimated population of 6.8 million in 2018, this is still a large ratio.

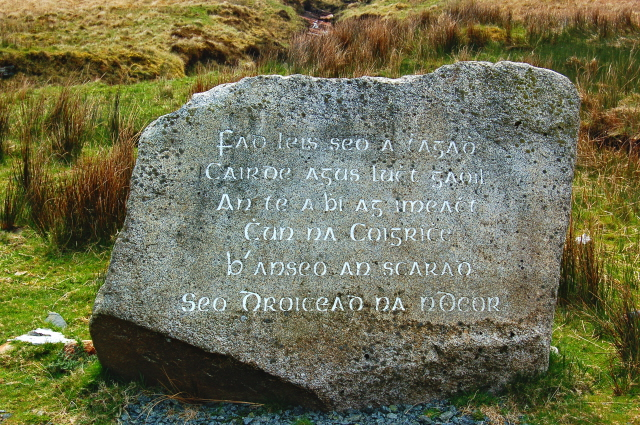
A plaque commemorating The Bridge of Tears, which reads, "Fad leis seo a thagadh cairde agus lucht gaoil an té a bhí ag imeacht chun na coigríche. B'anseo an scaradh. Seo Droichead na nDeor" (Family and friends of the person leaving for foreign lands would come this far. Here was the separation. This is the Bridge of Tears).

However, the usage of Irish diaspora is generally not limited by citizenship status, thus leading to an estimated (and fluctuating) membership of up to 80 million persons—the second and more emotive definition. The Irish Government acknowledged this interpretation—although it did not acknowledge any legal obligations to persons in this larger diaspora—when Article 2 of the Constitution of Ireland was amended in 1998 to read "[f]urthermore, the Irish nation cherishes its special affinity with people of Irish ancestry living abroad who share its cultural identity and heritage."

There are people of Irish descent abroad (including Irish speakers) who reject inclusion in an Irish "diaspora" and who designate their identity in other ways. They may see the diasporic label as something used by the Irish government for its own purposes.

== Causes ==
External videos
- Part One of Booknotes interview with Thomas Keneally on The Great Shame and the Triumph of the Irish in the English-Speaking World, 2 January 2000, C-SPAN
- Part Two of Booknotes interview with Keneally, 9 January 2000, C-SPAN

The Irish, who were called by the Romans Scotti but called themselves Gaels, had raided and settled along the West Coast of Roman Britain, and numbers of them were allowed to settle within the province, where the Roman Army recruited many Irish into auxiliary units that were dispatched to the German frontier. The Attacotti, who were similarly recruited into the Roman army, may also have been Irish settlers in Britain. The movement between Ireland and the classical Britain may have been two-way as similarities between the medieval accounts of Túathal Techtmar and archaeological evidence indicate that the Romans may have supported the invasion and conquest of Ireland by Irish exiles from Britain with the hope of establishing a friendly ruler who could halt the raiding of Britain by the Irish, and some historians have also suggested that the Cruthin of the north of Ireland may have been Picts. After the departure of the Roman army, the Irish began increasing their footholds in Britain, with part of the north-West of the island annexed within the Irish kingdom of Dál Riata. In time, the Irish colonies became independent, merged with the Pictish kingdom and formed the basis of modern Scotland.

The traditionally Gaelic-speaking areas of Scotland (the Highlands and Hebrides) are still referred to in the Gaelic language as a' Ghàidhealtachd ("the Gaeldom"). Irish monks and the Celtic Church engineered a wave of Irish emigration to Great Britain and Continental Europe and were possibly the first inhabitants of the Faroe Islands and Iceland. The presence of early-medieval Ogham inscriptions, primarily in Wales, but also the Isle of Man and England, along with Irish narratives, like The Expulsion of the Déisi, support further waves of Irish migration to Britain. Throughout the Early Middle Ages, Great Britain and Continental Europe experienced Irish immigration of varying intensity, mostly from clerics and scholars who are collectively known as peregrini. Irish emigration to Western Europe, especially to Great Britain, has continued at a greater or lesser pace since then. Today, the ethnic Irish are the single largest minority group in both England and Scotland, most of whom eventually made it back to Ireland.

The dispersal of the Irish has been mainly to Britain or to countries colonised by Britain. England's political connection with Ireland began in 1155, when Pope Adrian IV issued a papal bull (known as Laudabiliter), which gave Henry II permission to invade Ireland as a means of strengthening the papacy's control over the Irish Church. That was followed in 1169 by the Norman invasion of Ireland, which was led by the general Richard de Clare, or Strongbow.

The English Crown did not attempt to assert full control of the island until after Henry VIII's repudiation of papal authority over the Church in England, and the subsequent rebellion of the Earl of Kildare in Ireland in 1534 threatened English hegemony there. Until the break with Rome, it was widely believed that Ireland was a papal possession, which was granted as a mere fiefdom to the English king and so in 1541, Henry VIII asserted England's claim to Ireland free from the papal overlordship by proclaiming himself King of Ireland.

After the Nine Years' War (1594 to 1603), political power rested in the hands of a Protestant Ascendancy minority and was marked by a Crown policy of plantation, which involved the arrival of thousands of English and Scottish Protestant settlers and the consequent displacement of the pre-plantation Roman Catholic landholders. As the military and political defeat of Gaelic Ireland became more pronounced in the early 17th century, sectarian conflict became a recurrent theme in Irish history.

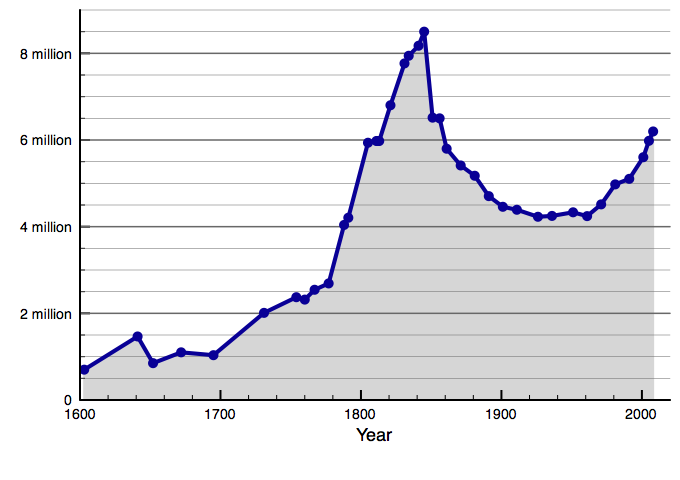
Irish population 1600–2010. Note the decrease beginning in 1845.

Roman Catholics and members of dissenting Protestant denominations suffered severe political and economic privations from Penal Laws. The Irish Parliament was abolished in 1801 in the wake of the republican United Irishmen Rebellion, and Ireland became an integral part of a new United Kingdom of Great Britain and Ireland under the Act of Union.

The Great Famine during the 1840s saw a significant number of people flee from the island to all over the world. Between 1841 and 1851, as a result of death and mass emigration, mainly to Great Britain and North America, Ireland's population fell by over 2 million. In Connacht alone, the population fell by almost 30%.

Robert E. Kennedy explains, however, that the common argument that the mass emigration from Ireland was a "flight from famine" is not entirely correct. Firstly, the Irish had been coming to Great Britain to build canals there since the 18th century, and as soon as conditions in Ireland improved, their emigration did not slow down. After the famine ended, the four years that followed it were marked by more emigration than the four years of the blight. Kennedy argues that the famine was considered the final straw because it convinced more people to move even though several other factors influenced their decision.

By 1900, the population of Ireland was about half of its 1840 peak, and it continued to fall during the 20th century.

In the decades that followed independence in the 1920s, emigration accelerated for economic and social reasons, and with the preferred destination switching from the United States to Great Britain, over 500,000 emigrated in the 1950s and 450,000 in the 1980s, and over 3 million Irish citizens resided outside Ireland in 2017.

Irish people who still lived in Ireland were subjected to discrimination by Great Britain based on their religion. Evictions increased after the repeal of the British Corn Laws in 1846, the passage of the Encumbered Estates' Court in 1849 and the removal of existing civil rights and class norms. Any remaining hope for change was squashed by the 1847 death of Daniel O'Connell, the political leader who championed liberal and reform causes and emancipation for Ireland's Catholics, and the failed rising of the Young Irelanders in 1848. More was to be gained by immigrating to America from Ireland, and the 1848 discovery of gold in the Sierra Nevada lured away more.

== United Kingdom ==
Irish migration to Great Britain has occurred since the early medieval period. The largest waves of Irish migration occurred in the 19th century, when a devastating famine broke out in Ireland, resulting in thousands of Irish immigrants settling down in Britain, primarily in the port cities of Liverpool and Glasgow. Other waves of Irish migration occurred during the 20th century, as Irish immigrants escaping poor economic conditions in Ireland following the establishment of the Irish Free State, came to Britain in response to labour shortages. These waves of migration have resulted in millions of British citizens being of Irish descent.

An article for The Guardian estimated that as many as six million people living in the United Kingdom have an Irish-born grandparent (around 10% of the British population).

The 2001 UK census states that 869,093 people born in Ireland are living in Great Britain. More than 10% of those born in the United Kingdom have at least one grandparent born in Ireland. The article "More Britons applying for Irish passports" states that 6 million Britons have either an Irish grandfather or grandmother and are thus able to apply for Irish citizenship. Almost a quarter claimed some Irish ancestry in one survey.

The Irish have traditionally been involved in the building trade and transport particularly as dockers, following an influx of Irish workers, or navvies, to build the British canal, road and rail networks in the 19th century. This is largely due to the flow of emigrants from Ireland during the Great Famine of 1845–1849. Many Irish servicemen, particularly sailors, settled in Britain: During the first half of the 19th century a third of the Army and Royal Navy were Irish. The Irish still represent a large contingent of foreign volunteers to the British military. Since the 1950s and 1960s in particular, the Irish have become assimilated into the British population. Emigration continued into the next century; over half a million Irish went to Britain in World War II to work in industry and serve in the British armed forces. In the post-war reconstruction era, the numbers of immigrants began to increase, many settling in the larger cities and towns of Britain. According to the 2001 census, around 850,000 people in Britain were born in Ireland.

The largest Irish communities in Britain are located predominantly in the cities and towns: in London, in particular Kilburn (which has one of the largest Irish-born communities outside Ireland) out to the west and north west of the city, in the large port cities such as Liverpool (which elected the first Irish nationalist members of parliament), Glasgow, Bristol, Sunderland and Portsmouth. Big industrial cities such as Salford, Manchester, Luton, Coventry, Birmingham, Sheffield, Wolverhampton, Cardiff and parts of Newcastle and Nottingham also have large diaspora populations due to the Industrial Revolution and, in the case of the first three, the strength of the motor industry in the 1960s and 1970s. The towns of Hebburn, Jarrow and Coatbridge have all earned the nickname 'Little Ireland' due to their high Irish populations.

Central to the Irish community in Britain was the community's relationship with the Roman Catholic Church, with which it maintained a strong sense of identity. The Church remains a crucial focus of communal life among some of the immigrant population and their descendants. The largest ethnic group among the Roman Catholic priesthood of Britain remains Irish (in the United States, the upper ranks of the Church's hierarchy are of predominantly Irish descent). The former head of the Roman Catholic Church in Scotland is Cardinal Keith O'Brien.

Scotland experienced a significant amount of Irish immigration, particularly in Glasgow, Edinburgh and Coatbridge. This led to the formation of Celtic Football Club in 1888 by Marist Brother Walfrid, to raise money to help the community. In Edinburgh Hibernian were founded in 1875 and in 1909 another club with Irish links, Dundee United, was formed. Likewise the Irish community in London formed the London Irish rugby union club. The 2001 UK census states in Scotland 50,000 people identified as having Irish heritage.

The Irish have maintained a strong political presence in the UK (mostly in Scotland), in local government and at the national level. Former prime ministers David Cameron, Tony Blair, John Major and James Callaghan have been amongst the many in Britain of part-Irish ancestry; Blair's mother, Hazel Elizabeth Rosaleen Corscaden, was born on 12 June 1923 in Ballyshannon, County Donegal. Former Chancellor George Osborne is a member of the Anglo-Irish aristocracy and heir to the baronetcies of Ballentaylor and Ballylemon.

Moreover, the UK holds official public St. Patrick's Day celebrations. While many such celebrations were suspended in the 1970s because of The Troubles, the holiday is now widely celebrated by the UK public.

== The rest of Europe ==
Irish links with the continent go back many centuries. During the early Middle Ages, 700–900 AD, many Irish religious figures went abroad to preach and found monasteries in what is known as the Hiberno-Scottish mission. Saint Brieuc founded the city that bears his name in Brittany, Saint Colmán founded the great monastery of Bobbio in northern Italy and one of his monks was Saint Gall for whom the Swiss town of St Gallen and canton of St Gallen are named.

During the Counter-Reformation, Irish religious and political links with Europe became stronger. An important centre of learning and training for Irish priests developed in Leuven (Lúbhan in Irish) in the Duchy of Brabant, now in Flanders (northern Belgium). The Flight of the Earls, in 1607, led much of the Gaelic nobility to flee the country, and after the wars of the 17th century many others fled to Spain, France, Austria, and other Roman Catholic lands. The lords and their retainers and supporters joined the armies of these countries, and were known as the Wild Geese. Some of the lords and their descendants rose to high ranks in their adoptive countries, such as the Spanish general and politician Leopoldo O'Donnell, 1st Duke of Tetuan, who became the president of the Government of Spain or the French general and politician Patrice de Mac-Mahon, Duke of Magenta, who became the president of the French Republic. The French Cognac brandy maker, Hennessy, was founded by Richard Hennessy, an Irish officer in the Clare Regiment of the Irish Brigade of the French Army. In Spain and its territories, many Irish descendants can be found with the name Obregón (O'Brien, Irish, Ó Briain), including Madrid-born actress Ana Victoria García Obregón.

During the 20th century, certain Irish intellectuals made their homes in continental Europe, particularly James Joyce, and later Samuel Beckett (who became a courier for the French Resistance). Eoin O'Duffy led a brigade of 700 Irish volunteers to fight for Franco during the Spanish Civil War, and Frank Ryan led the Connolly Column who fought on the opposite side, with the Republican International Brigades. William Joyce became an English-language propagandist for Nazi Germany, known colloquially as Lord Haw-Haw.

== The Americas ==
Some of the first Irish people to travel to the New World did so as members of the Spanish garrison in Florida during the 1560s, and small numbers of Irish colonists were involved in efforts to establish colonies in the Amazon region, in Newfoundland, and in Virginia between 1604 and the 1630s. According to historian Donald Akenson, there were "few if any" Irish being forcibly transported to the New World during this period.

The Plantation of Ulster, by the Stuart monarchy of the early 17th century, primarily in the lands gained by the Flight of the Earls, with an equal number of loyal Lowland Scots and redundant English Border reivers, caused resentment, as did their transferring of all property owned by the Roman Catholic Church to the Church of Ireland, resulting in the Irish Rebellion of 1641. Following the rebellion's failure the Commonwealth regime began to pacify Ireland, through the sentencing and transporting Irish rebels (known as “tories”), Catholic priests, friars and schoolmasters, to indentured servitude in the Crown's New World colonies. This increased following the Cromwellian invasion of Ireland (1649–1653), of the Wars of the Three Kingdoms (1639–1653). Cromwell took Irish land both to repay investors who had financed the invasion and as payment for his soldiers, many of whom settled down in Ireland. As a result, Irish in Leinster, and Munster, with property worth more than £10, were ordered to move to Connaught, to land valued at no more than 1/3 the value of their current holding, or be banished on pain of death. In the 17th century 50,000 Irish people are estimated to have migrated to the New World colonies, 165,000 by 1775. During these events from 1641 to 1653, the population of Ireland fell between 20 and 40 percent due to famine and other war-related causes, but doubled from approximately one to two million over the whole century.

=== Argentina ===
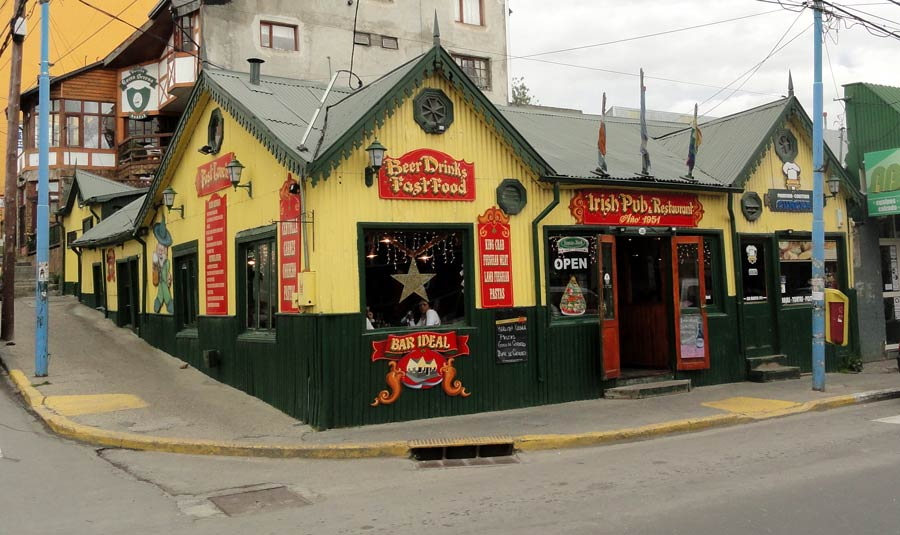
Irish pub in Ushuaia, Tierra del Fuego.

In the 19th and early 20th centuries, over 38,000 Irish immigrated to Argentina. Very distinct Irish communities and schools existed until the Perón era in the 1950s.

Today there are an estimated 500,000 people of Irish ancestry in Argentina, approximately 15.5% of the Republic of Ireland's current population; however, these numbers may be far higher, given that many Irish newcomers declared themselves to be British, as Ireland at the time was still part of the United Kingdom and today their descendants integrated into Argentine society with mixed bloodlines.

The modern Irish-Argentine community is composed of some of their descendants, and the total number is estimated at between 500,000 and 1,000,000.

Argentina is the home of the fifth largest Irish community in the world, the largest in a non-English speaking nation and the greatest in South America.

Despite the fact that Argentina was never the main destination for Irish emigrants it does form part of the Irish diaspora. The Irish-Argentine William Bulfin remarked as he travelled around Westmeath in the early 20th century that he came across many locals who had been to Buenos Aires. Several families from Bere island, County Cork were encouraged to send emigrants to Argentina by an islander who had been successful there in the 1880s.

Considered by some to be a national hero, William Brown is the most famous Irish citizen in Argentina. Creator of the Argentine Navy (Armada de la República Argentina, ARA) and leader of the Argentine Armed Forces in the wars against Brazil and Spain, he was born in Foxford, County Mayo on 22 June 1777 and died in Buenos Aires in 1857. The Almirante Brown-class destroyer is named after him, as well as the Almirante Brown partido, part of the Gran Buenos Aires urban area, with a population of over 500.000 inhabitants.

The first entirely Roman Catholic English language publication published in Buenos Aires, The Southern Cross is an Argentine newspaper founded on 16 January 1875 by Dean Patricio Dillon, an Irish immigrant, a deputy for Buenos Aires Province and president of the Presidential Affairs Commission amongst other positions. The newspaper continues in print to this day and publishes a beginner's guide to the Irish language, helping Irish Argentines keep in touch with their cultural heritage. Previously to The Southern Cross Dublin-born brothers Edward and Michael Mulhall successfully published The Standard, allegedly the first English-language daily paper in South America.

Between 1943 and 1946, the de facto President of Argentina was Edelmiro Farrell, whose paternal ancestry was Irish.

=== Bermuda ===
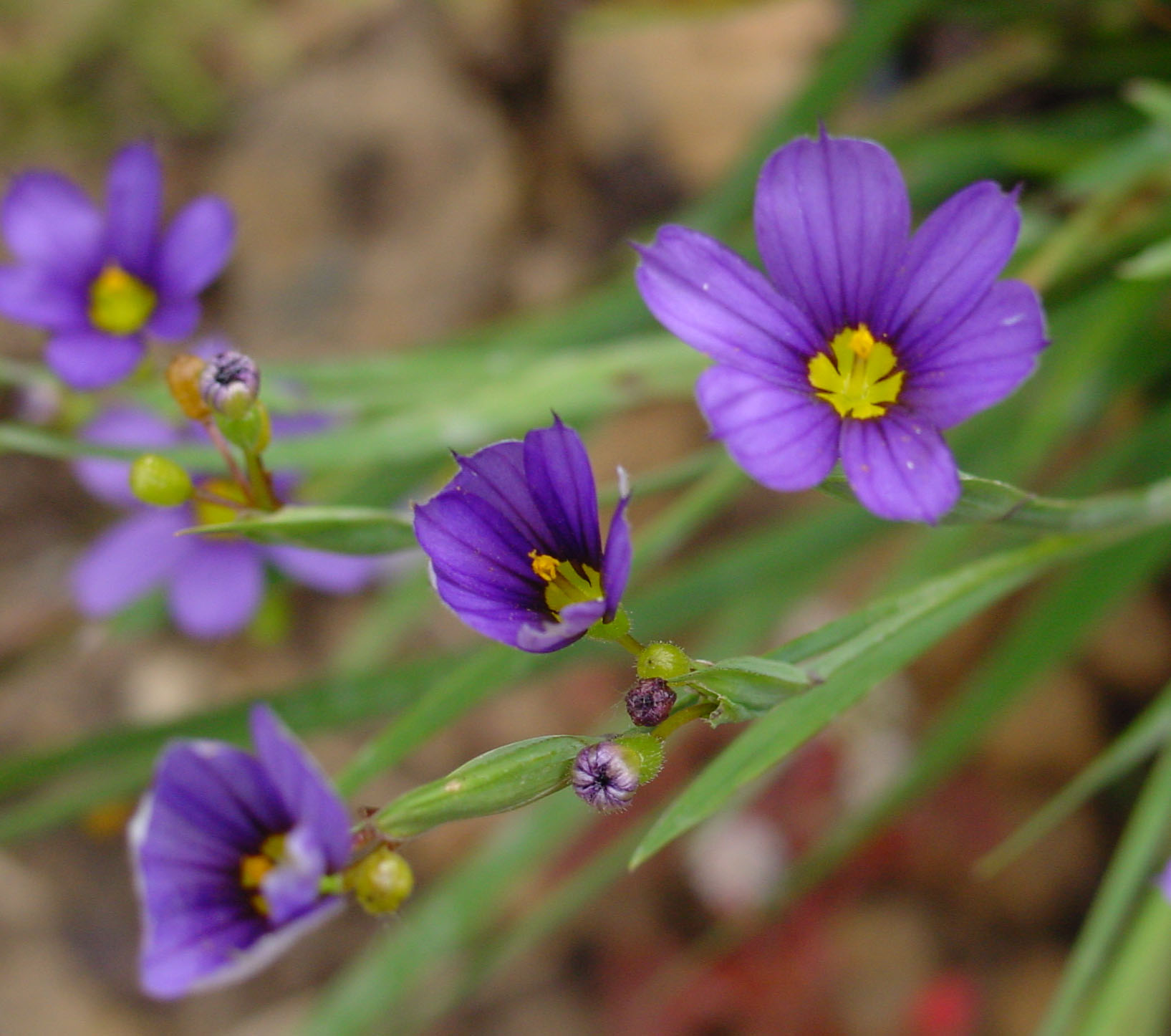
Bermudiana (Sisyrinchium bermudiana), found only in Bermuda and Ireland

Early in its history, Bermuda had reputed connections with Ireland. It has been suggested that St. Brendan discovered it during his legendary voyage; a local psychiatric hospital (since renamed) was named after him. In 1616, an incident occurred in which five white settlers arrived in Ireland, having crossed the Atlantic (a distance of around 5,000 kilometres (3,100 mi)) in a two-ton boat. By the following year, one of Bermuda's main islands was named after Ireland. By the mid-17th century, Irish prisoners of war and civilian captives were involuntarily shipped to Bermuda, condemned to indentured servitude. These people had become indentured as a result of the Cromwellian conquest of Ireland. The Cromwellian conquest led to Irish captives, from both military and civilian backgrounds, to be sent as indentured servants to the West Indies. The Puritan Commonwealth government saw sending indentured servants from Ireland to the Caribbean as both assisting in their conquest of the island (by removing the strongest resistance against their rule) and saving the souls of the Roman Catholic Irish servants by settling them in Protestant-dominated colonies where they would supposedly inevitably convert to the "true faith".

These rapid demographic changes quickly began to alarm the dominant Anglo-Bermudian population, in particular the Irish indentured servants, most of whom were presumed to be secretly practising Catholicism (recusancy had been outlawed by the colonial government). Relationships between the Anglo-Bermudian community and Irish indentured servants consistently remained hostile, resulting in the Irish responding to ostracism by ultimately merging with the Scottish, African and Native American communities in Bermuda to form a new demographic: the coloureds, which in Bermuda meant anyone not entirely of European descent. In modern-day Bermuda, the term has been replaced by 'Black', in which wholly sub-Saharan African ancestry is erroneously implicit. The Irish quickly proved hostile to their new conditions in Bermuda, and colonial legislation soon stipulated:

that those that hath the Irish servants should take care that they straggle not night nor daie as is too common with them. If any masters or dames be remiss hereafter in watching over them, they shall be fyned according to the discretion of the Governor and counsell, and that it shall not be lawfull for any inhabitant in these Islands to buy or purchase any more of the Irish nation upon any pretence whatsoever".

In September, 1658, three Irishmen – John Chehen (Shehan, Sheehan, Sheene, or Sheen), David Laragen and Edmund Malony – were lashed for breaking curfew and being suspected of stealing a boat. Jeames Benninge (a Scottish indentured servant), black Franke (a servant to Mr John Devitt), and Tomakin, Clemento, and black Dick (servants of Mrs Anne Trimingham) were also punished.

In 1661, the colonial government alleged that a plot was being hatched by an alliance of Blacks and Irish, one which involved cutting the throats of all Bermudians of English descent. The governor of Bermuda, William Sayle (who had returned to Bermuda after the Bermudian colonial government acknowledged the authority of Parliament) countered the alleged plot with three edicts: The first was that a nightly watch be raised throughout the colony; second, that slaves and the Irish be disarmed of militia weapons; and third, that any gathering of two or more Irish or slaves be dispersed by whipping. There were no arrests, trials or executions connected to the plot, though an Irish woman named Margaret was found to be romantically involved with a Native American; she was voted to be stigmatised and he was whipped.

During the course of the seventeenth and eighteenth Centuries, the colony's various demographic groups boiled down to free whites and mostly enslaved "coloured" Bermudians with a homogeneous Anglo-Bermudian culture. Little survived of the Irish culture brought by indentured servants from Ireland. Catholicism was outlawed in Bermuda by the colonial authorities, and all islanders were required by law to attend services of the established Anglican church. Some surnames that were common in Bermuda at this period, however, give lingering evidence of the Irish presence. For example, the area to the east of Bailey's Bay, in Hamilton Parish, is named Callan Glen for a Scottish-born shipwright, Claude MacCallan, who settled in Bermuda after the vessel in which he was a passenger was wrecked off the North Shore in 1787. MacCallan swam to a rock from which he was rescued by a Bailey's Bay fisherman named Daniel Seon (Sheehan). A later Daniel Seon was appointed Clerk of the House of Assembly and Prothonotary of the Court of General Assize in 1889 (he was also the Registrar of the Supreme Court, and died in 1909).

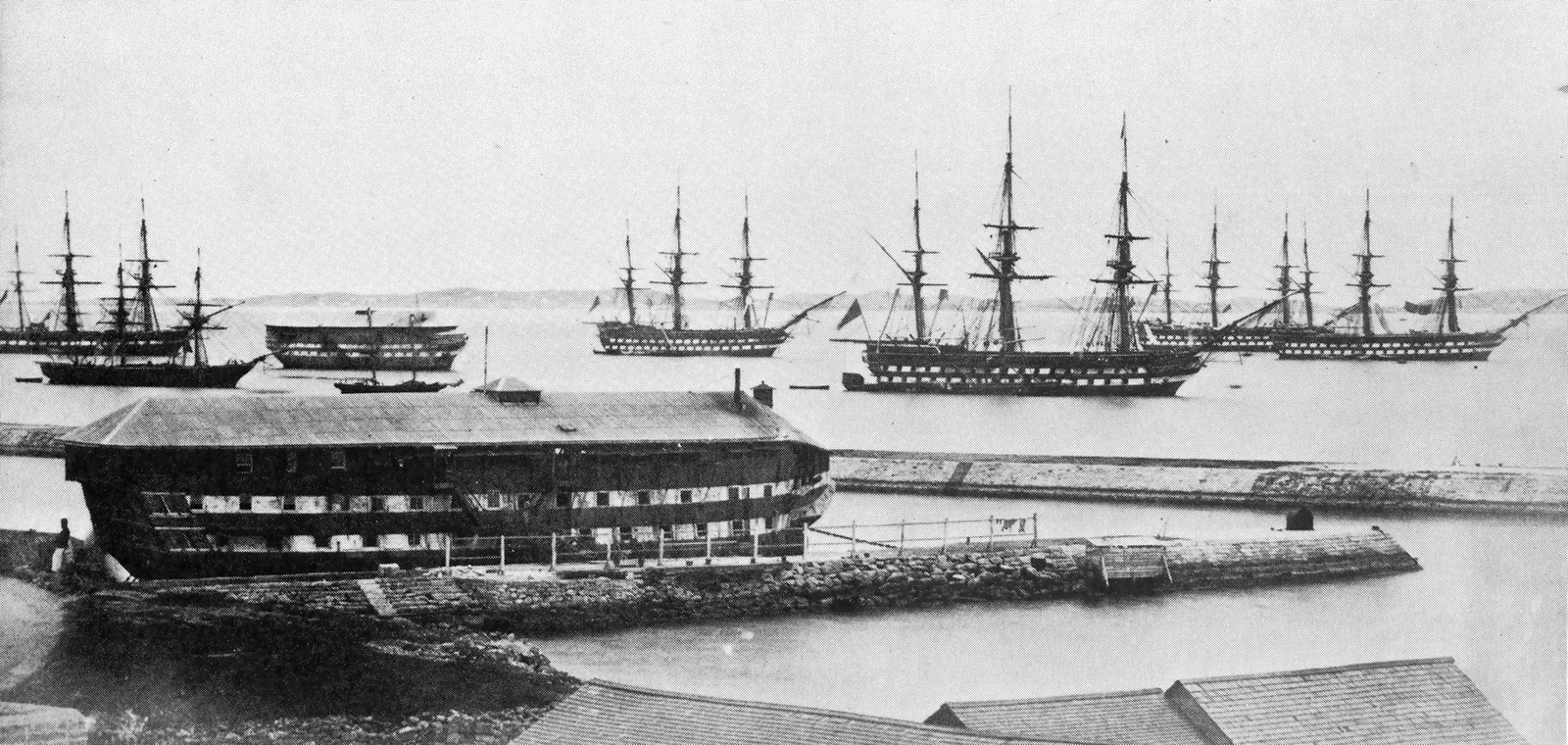
The hulk of Medway and the Grassy Bay anchorage seen from HMD Bermuda in 1862

In 1803, Irish poet Thomas Moore arrived in Bermuda, having been appointed registrar to the Admiralty there. Robert Kennedy, born in Cultra, County Down, was the Government of Bermuda's Colonial Secretary, and was the acting Governor of Bermuda on three occasions (1829, 1830 and 1835–1836). Irish prisoners were again sent to Bermuda in the 19th century, including participants in the ill-fated Young Irelander Rebellion of 1848, nationalist journalist and politician John Mitchel, and painter and convicted murderer William Burke Kirwan. Alongside English convicts, they were used to build the Royal Naval Dockyard on Ireland Island. Conditions for the convicts were harsh, and discipline was draconian. In April, 1830, convict James Ryan was shot and killed during rioting of convicts on Ireland Island. Another five convicts were given death sentences for their parts in the riots, with those of the youngest three being commuted to transportation (to Australia) for life. In June 1849 convict James Cronin, on the hulk Medway at Ireland Island, was placed in solitary confinement from the 25th to the 29th for fighting. On release, and being returned to work, he refused to be cross-ironed. He ran onto the breakwater, brandishing a poker threateningly. For this, he was ordered to receive punishment (presumably flogging) on Tuesday, 3 July 1849, with the other convicts aboard the hulk assembled behind a rail to witness. When ordered to strip, he hesitated. Thomas Cronin, his older brother, addressed him and, while brandishing a knife, rushed forward to the separating rail. He called out to the other prisoners in Irish and many joined him in attempting to free the prisoner and attack the officers. The officers opened fire. Two men were killed and twelve wounded. Punishment of James Cronin was then carried out. Three hundred men of the 42nd Regiment of Foot, in barracks on Ireland Island, responded to the scene under arms.

Although the Roman Catholic Church (which had been banned in Bermuda, as in the rest of England, since settlement) began to operate openly in Bermuda in the 19th century, its priests were not permitted to conduct baptisms, weddings or funerals. As the most important British naval and military base in the Western Hemisphere following US independence, large numbers of Irish Roman Catholic soldiers served in the British Army's Bermuda Garrison (the Royal Navy had also benefitted from a shipload of Irish emigres wrecked on Bermuda, with most being recruited into the navy there). The first Roman Catholic services in Bermuda were conducted by British Army chaplains early in the 19th century. Mount Saint Agnes Academy, a private school operated by the Roman Catholic Church of Bermuda, opened in 1890 at the behest of officers of the 86th (Royal County Down) Regiment of Foot (which was posted to Bermuda from 1880 to 1883), who had requested from the Archbishop of Halifax, Nova Scotia, a school for the children of Irish Roman Catholic soldiers.

Not all Irish soldiers in Bermuda had happy lives there. Private Joseph McDaniel of the 30th Regiment of Foot (who was born in the East Indies to an Irish father and a Malay mother) was convicted of the murder of Mary Swears in June, 1837, after he had been found with a self-inflicted wound and her lifeless body. Although he maintained his innocence throughout the trial, after his conviction he confessed that they had made a pact to die together. Although he had succeeded in killing her, he survived his suicide attempt. He was put to death on Wednesday, 29 November 1837. Private Patrick Shea of the 20th Regiment of Foot was sentenced to death in June 1846, for discharging his weapon at Sergeant John Evans. His sentence was commuted to transportation (to Australia) for life. In October, 1841, County Carlow-born Peter Doyle had also been transported to Australia for fourteen years for shooting at a picket. At his court martial he had explained that he had been drunk at the time.

Other Irish soldiers, taking discharge, made a home in Bermuda, remaining there for the rest of their lives. Dublin-born Sapper Cornelius Farrell was discharged in Bermuda from the Royal Engineers. His three Bermudian-born sons followed him into the army, fighting on the Western Front during the First World War in the Bermuda Volunteer Rifle Corps.

Although there is little surviving evidence of Irish culture, some elderly islanders can remember when the term "cilig" (or killick) was used to describe a common method of fishing for sea turtles by tricking them into swimming into prearranged nets (this was done by splashing a stone on a line—the cilig—into the water on the turtle's opposite side). The word cilig appears to be meaningless in English, but in some dialects of Gaelic is used as an adjective meaning "easily deceived". In Irish there is a word cílí meaning sly. It is used in the expression Is é an cílí ceart é (pronounced Shayeh kilic airtay) and means What a sly-boots. Alternatively, the word may be derived from an Irish word for a stone and wood anchor. Characteristics of older Bermudian accents, such as the pronunciation of the letter 'd' as 'dj', as in Bermudjin (Bermudian), may indicate an Irish origin. Later Irish immigrants have continued to contribute to Bermuda's makeup, with names like Crockwell (Ó Creachmhaoil) and O'Connor (Ó Conchobhair) now being thought of locally as Bermudian names. The strongest remaining Irish influence can be seen in the presence of bagpipes in the music of Bermuda, which stemmed from the presence of Scottish and Irish soldiers from the 18th through 20th centuries. Several prominent businesses in Bermuda have a clear Irish influence, such as the Irish Linen Shop, Tom Moore's Tavern and Flanagan's Irish Pub and Restaurant.

A succession of Irish Masonic lodges have existed in Bermuda, beginning with Military Lodge #192, established by soldiers of the 47th Regiment of Foot, and operating in Bermuda from 1793 to 1801. This was an ambulatory or travelling lodge, as with other military lodges, moving with its members. Irish Lodges #220 (also a military travelling lodge) was active in Bermuda from 1856 to 1861, and Irish Lodge #209 was established in Bermuda in 1881. Minder Lodge #63 of the Irish Constitution was in Bermuda with the 20th Regiment of Foot from 1841 to 1847. The Hannibal Lodge #224 of the Irish Constitution was warranted in 1867, and still exists, meeting in the Masonic Hall on Old Maid's Lane, St. George's. Another Hannibal Chapter, #123 of the Irish Constitution, was chartered in 1877, but lasted only until 1911.

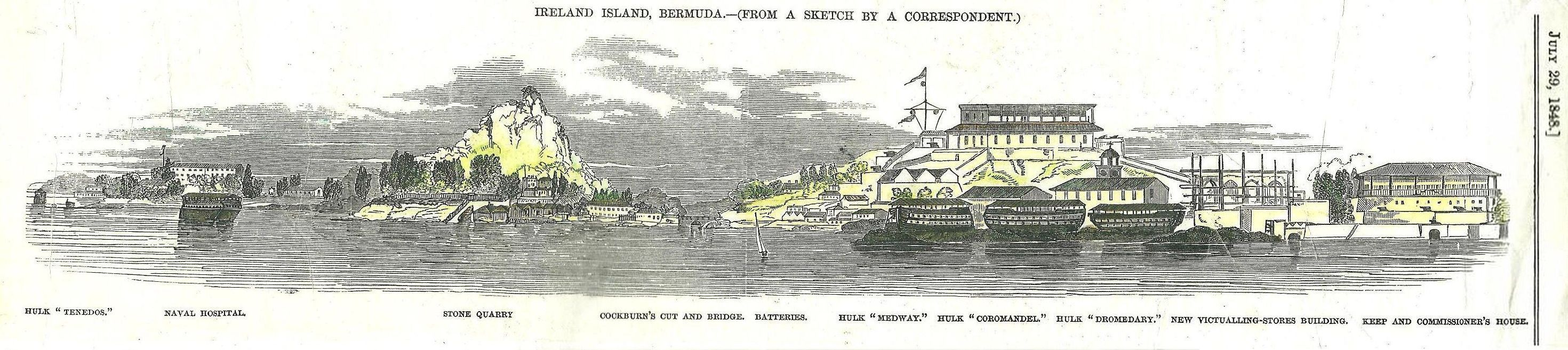
An 1848 woodcut of HMD Bermuda, Ireland Island, Bermuda.

=== Brazil ===
The first known Irish settler in Brazil was a missionary, Thomas Field, who arrived to Brazil in late 1577 and spent three years in Piratininga (present-day São Paulo). In 1612, the Irish brothers Philip and James Purcell established a colony in Tauregue, at the mouth of the Amazon river, where English, Dutch, and French settlements were also established. Many of the colonists traded in tobacco, dyes, and hardwoods. A second group of Irish settlers led by Bernardo O'Brien of County Clare arrived in 1620. The first recorded Saint Patrick's Day celebration was on 17 March 1770.

During the Cisplatine War, Brazil sent recruiters to Ireland to recruit men as soldiers for the war against Argentina. Any Irish that signed up for the Brazilian army were promised that if they enlisted they would be given a grant of land after five years of service. Approximately 2,400 men were recruited and when they arrived in Brazil (many with their families), they were completely neglected by the government. The Irish mutinied together with a German regiment, and for a few days there was open warfare on the streets of Rio de Janeiro. While most were ultimately sent home or re-emigrated to Canada or Argentina, some did stay and were sent to form a colony in the province of Bahia.

Several attempts were made by Brazil to bring in more Irish immigrants to settle in the country, however, much of the land given to the settlers was porous or in extremely remote locations. Many of the Irish settlers died or re-emigrated to other countries. At the same time, several prominent Irish figures served in diplomatic posts in Brazil for the United Kingdom (as Ireland was part of the British Empire). Irish nationalist and British diplomat Roger Casement, served as British Consul in Santos, Belém, and in Rio de Janeiro.

=== Canada ===
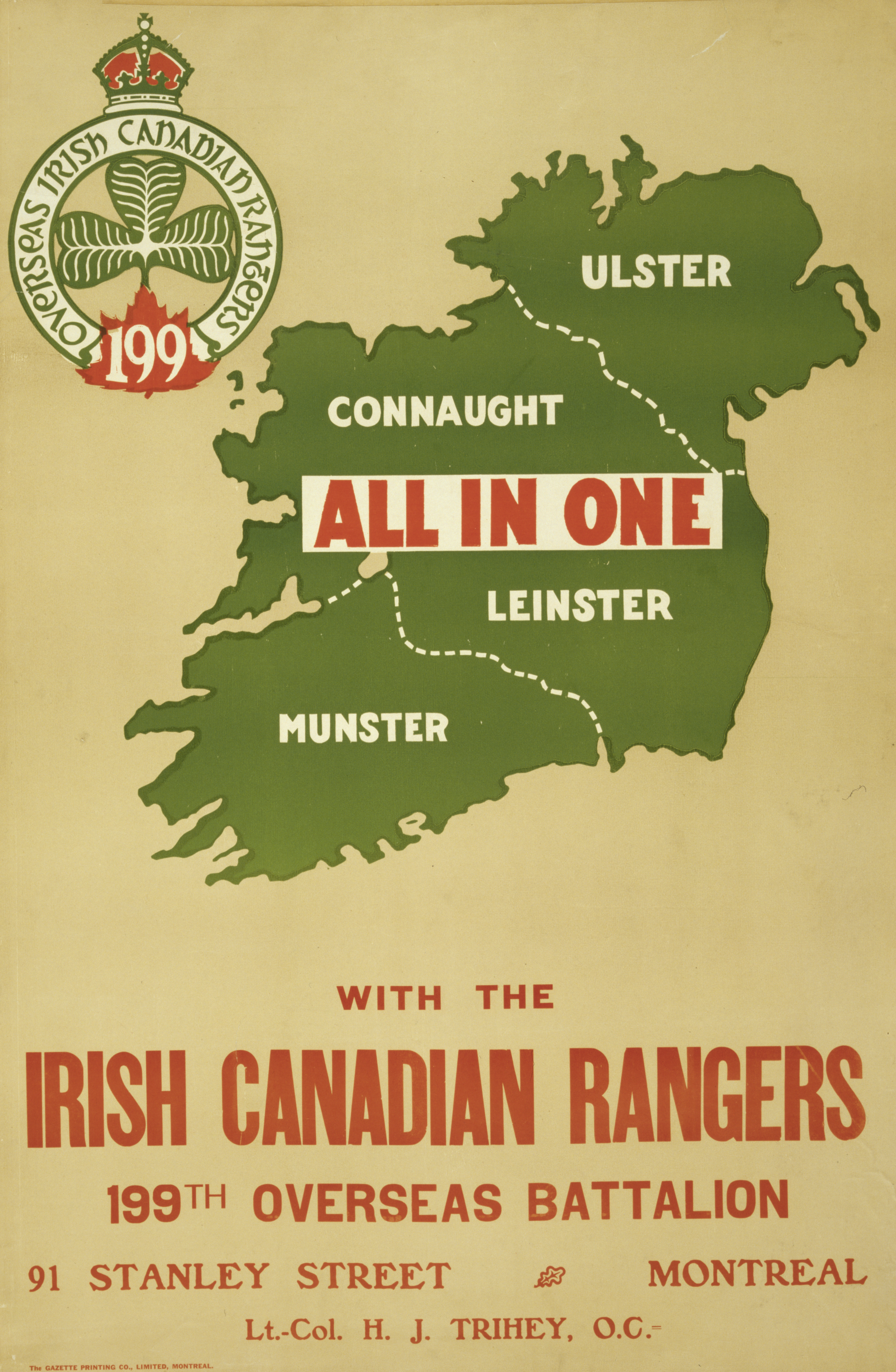
First World War recruiting poster for the Irish Canadian Rangers

The 2006 census by Statcan, Canada's Official Statistical office revealed that the Irish were the 4th largest ethnic group with 4,354,155 Canadians with full or partial Irish descent or 14% of the nation's total population. During the 2016 census by Statistics Canada, the Irish ethnicity retained its spot as the 4th largest ethnic group with 4,627,000 Canadians with full or partial Irish descent.

After the permanent settlement in Newfoundland by Irish in the late 18th and early 19th century, overwhelmingly from County Waterford, increased immigration of the Irish elsewhere in Canada began in the decades following the War of 1812 and formed a significant part of The Great Migration of Canada. Between 1825 and 1845, 60% of all immigrants to Canada were Irish; in 1831 alone, some 34,000 arrived in Montreal.

Between 1830 and 1850, 624,000 Irish arrived; in contextual terms, at the end of this period, the population of the provinces of Canada was 2.4 million. Besides Upper Canada (Ontario), Lower Canada (Quebec), the Maritime colonies of Nova Scotia, Prince Edward Island and New Brunswick, especially Saint John, were arrival points. Not all remained; many out-migrated to the United States or to Western Canada in the decades that followed. Few returned to Ireland.

Many Newfoundlanders are of Irish descent. It is estimated that about 80% of Newfoundlanders have Irish ancestry on at least one side of their family tree. The family names, the predominant Roman Catholic religion, the prevalence of Irish music – even the accents of the people – are so reminiscent of rural Ireland that Irish author Tim Pat Coogan has described Newfoundland as "the most Irish place in the world outside Ireland". Newfoundland Irish, the dialect of the Irish language specific to the island was widely spoken until the mid-20th century. It is very similar to the language heard in the southeast of Ireland centuries ago, due to mass emigration from counties Tipperary, Waterford, Wexford, Kerry and Cork.

Saint John, New Brunswick, claims the distinction of being Canada's most Irish city, according to census records. There have been Irish settlers in New Brunswick since at least the late 18th century, but during the peak of the Great Irish Famine (1845–1847), thousands of Irish emigrated through Partridge Island in the port of Saint John. Most of these Irish were Roman Catholic, who changed the complexion of the Loyalist city. A large, vibrant Irish community can also be found in the Miramichi region of New Brunswick.

Guysborough County, Nova Scotia has many rural Irish villages. Erinville (which means Irishville), Salmon River, Ogden, Bantry (named after Bantry Bay, County Cork, Ireland but now abandoned and grown up in trees) among others, where Irish last names are prevalent and the accent is reminiscent of the Irish as well as the music, traditions, religion (Roman Catholic), and the love of Ireland itself. Some of the Irish counties from which these people arrived were County Kerry (Dingle Peninsula), County Cork, and County Roscommon, along with others.

Quebec is also home to a large Irish community, especially in Montreal, where the Irish shamrock is featured on the municipal flag. Notably, thousands of Irish emigrants during the Famine passed through Grosse Isle near Québec City, where many succumbed to typhus. Most of the Irish who settled near Québec City are now French speakers.

Irish Catholic settlers also opened up new agricultural areas in the recently surveyed Eastern Townships, the Ottawa Valley, and Gatineau and Pontiac counties. Irish from Quebec would also settle in communities such as Frampton, Saint Sylvestre, and Saint Patrick in the Beauce region of southeastern Quebec.

Ontario has over 2 million people of Irish descent, who in greater numbers arrived in the 1820s and the decades that followed to work on colonial infrastructure and to settle land tracts in Upper Canada, the result today is a countryside speckled with the place names of Ireland. Ontario received a large number of those who landed in Quebec during the Famine years, many thousands died in Ontario's ports. Irish-born became the majority in Toronto by 1851.

=== Caribbean ===
From the 1620s, many of the Irish Roman Catholic merchant class in this period migrated voluntarily to the West Indies to avail of the business opportunities there occasioned by the trade in sugar, tobacco and cotton. They were followed by landless Irish indentured labourers, who were recruited to serve a landowner for a specified time before receiving freedom and land. The descendants of some Irish immigrants are known today in the West Indies as redlegs. Most descendants of these Irishmen moved off the islands as African slavery was implemented and blacks began to replace whites. Many Barbadian-born Irishmen helped establish the Carolina colony in the United States.

After the Cromwellian conquest of Ireland Irish prisoners were forcibly transferred to English colonies in the Americas and sold into indentured servitude, a practice that came to be known as being Barbadosed, though Barbados was not the only colony to receive Irish prisoners, with those sent to Montserrat being the best known. To this day, Montserrat is the only country or territory in the world, apart from the Republic of Ireland, Northern Ireland and the Canadian province of Newfoundland to observe a public holiday on St Patrick's Day. The population is predominantly of mixed Irish and African descent.

==== Puerto Rico ====
Irish immigrants played an instrumental role in Puerto Rico's economy. One of the most important industries of the island was the sugar industry. Among the successful businessmen in this industry were Miguel Conway, who owned a plantation in the town of Hatillo and Juan Nagle whose plantation was located in Río Piedras. General Alexander O'Reilly, "Father of the Puerto Rican Militia", named Tomas O'Daly chief engineer of modernising the defences of San Juan, this included the fortress of San Cristóbal. Tomas O'Daly and Miguel Kirwan were partners in the "Hacienda San Patricio", which they named after the patron saint of Ireland, Saint Patrick. A relative of O'Daly, Demetrio O'Daly, succeeded Captain Ramon Power y Giralt as the island's delegate to the Spanish Courts. The plantation no longer exists; however, the land in which the plantation was located is now a San Patricio suburb with a shopping mall by the same name. The Quinlan family established two plantations, one in the town of Toa Baja and the other in Loíza. Puerto Ricans of Irish descent were also instrumental in the development of the island's tobacco industry. Among them Miguel Conboy who was a founder of the tobacco trade in Puerto Rico.

Other notable places in the Caribbean include:

- Antigua and Barbuda
- Barbados
- Jamaica
- Saint Kitts and Nevis
- Saint Lucia
- Trinidad and Tobago

=== Colombia ===
The presence and impact of the Irish in Colombia dates back to the time of Spanish rule, when in different historical periods they migrated to the Iberian Peninsula and from there to the American continent, enlisted in the colonization, trade, army and administration companies. One episode in which this group had a special impact was the colonization of the Darien (Gulf of Urabá) in 1788. In this place 64 families and 50 single individuals from North America were established, to which were added families from the interior. Of these families, 28 were of Irish origin, which shows their numerical importance and valuation as an emerging social group within the Hispanic world.

There is no doubt that the greatest concentration and contributions to the country occurred during the emancipation campaigns. It is enough to look at the list drawn up by researcher Matthew Brown to understand their importance and impact, for out of some 6,808 Europeans, the Irish represented 48%; we are talking about more than 3,000 Irish who fought to give freedom to Colombia. These would have come enlisted in the Irish Legion, where they were famous officers like: Casey, Devereux, Egan, Ferguson, Foley, Lanagan, Rooke, Larkin, McCarthy, Murphy, O'Leary, O'Connell, O'Connor and Sanders.

Once the wars of Independence were over, a good portion of them would have remained to form part of the Colombian army. Others, on the other hand, would have abandoned military life to integrate into society as businessmen, merchants, musicians, doctors, poets, miners and settlers. The economic sector in which the Irish participated the most was mining: they formed small mining colonies in the north and south of Antioquia. In the middle of the century, the English miner Tyrell Moore, presented to the Sovereign State of Antioquia a project to colonize with 200 Irish families in the north and lower Cauca, an intention that apparently met with local disapproval and added to other logistical problems made its materialization impossible. But the largest mining colony was established in the south (currently Caldas department), in towns such as Marmato and Supía. Among the hundreds of British, French, German and Swedish miners who moved there were some Irishmen such as Eduardo MacAllister, Joseph Raphson, Nicolas Fitzgerald, Juan O'Byrne, David Davis and the Nicholls.

In addition, this immigration has been highlighted in dozens of literary and academic works, the most important of which are: Irish Blood in Antioquia (Sangre irlandesa en Antioquia), by Aquiles Echeverri, Irish descendant; The Mysters of the Mines (Los místeres de las minas), by Alvaro Gartner and The Sanctuary: Global History of a Battle (El Santuario: Historia global de una batalla), by Matthew Brown. For all of the above, it is evident that Irish immigration has not been alien to us and its presence, traces and impact also constitute an important part of our past and historical and cultural heritage.

=== Chile ===
Many of the Wild Geese, expatriate Irish soldiers who had gone to Spain, or their descendants, continued on to its colonies in South America. Many of them rose to prominent positions in the Spanish governments there. In the 1820s, some of them helped liberate the continent. Bernardo O'Higgins was the first Supreme director of Chile. When Chilean troops occupied Lima during the War of the Pacific in 1881, they put in charge certain Patricio Lynch, whose grandfather came from Ireland to Argentina and then moved to Chile. Other Latin American countries that have Irish settlement include Puerto Rico and Colombia.

=== Mexico ===
The County Wexford born William Lamport, better known to most Mexicans as Guillén de Lampart, was a precursor of the Independence movement and author of the first proclamation of independence in the New World. His statue stands today inside the column of the Angel of Independence in Mexico City, Mexico. Juan de O'Donojú y O'Ryan, of Irish descent, was the last Viceroy of New Spain (Mexico), died and is buried in Mexico City.

Among the most famous Irishmen in Mexican history are "Los Patricios" of Saint Patrick's Battalion. Many communities existed in Mexican Texas until the revolution there, when they sided with Roman Catholic Mexico against Protestant pro-US elements. The Batallón de San Patricio, a battalion of US troops who deserted and fought alongside the Mexican Army against the United States in the Mexican–American War of 1846–1848, is well known in Mexican history. The most well known of these was Major John Riley.

Mexico also has a large number of people of Irish ancestry, among them the actor Anthony Quinn. There are monuments in Mexico City paying tribute to those Irish who fought for Mexico in the 19th century. There is a monument to Los Patricios in the fort of Churubusco. During the Great Famine, thousands of Irish immigrants entered the country. Other notable Mexicans of Irish descent are Romulo O'Farril, Juan O'Gorman, and Edmundo O'Gorman.

=== United States ===
The first Irish came to modern day America during the 1600s mostly to Virginia and mostly indentured servants. The diaspora to the United States was immortalised in the words of many songs including the Irish ballad, "The Green Fields of America":

So pack up your sea-stores, consider no longer,
Ten dollars a week is not very bad pay,
With no taxes or tithes to devour up your wages,
When you're on the green fields of Americay.

The experience of Irish immigrants in the United States has not always been harmonious. The US did not have a good relationship with most of the incoming Irish because of their Roman Catholic faith, as the majority of the population was Protestant and had been originally formed by offshoots of the Protestant faith, many of whom were from the north of Ireland (Ulster). So it came as no surprise that the federal government issued new immigration acts, adding to previous ones which limited Eastern European immigration, ones which limited the immigration of the Irish.

Those who were successful in coming over from Ireland were for the most part already good farmers and other hard labour workers, so the jobs they were taking were plentiful in the beginning. However, as time went on and the land needed less cultivation, the jobs the new Irish immigrants were taking were those that Americans wanted as well. In most cases, Irish newcomers were sometimes uneducated and often found themselves competing with Americans for manual labour jobs or, in the 1860s, being recruited from the docks by the US Army to serve in the American Civil War and afterward to build the Union Pacific Railroad. This view of the Irish-American experience is depicted by another traditional song, "Paddy's Lamentation."

Hear me boys, now take my advice,
To America I'll have ye's not be going,
There is nothing here but war, where the murderin' cannons roar,
And I wish I was at home in dear old Ireland.

The classic image of an Irish immigrant is led to a certain extent by racist and anti-Catholic stereotypes. In modern times, in the United States, the Irish are largely perceived as hard workers. Most notably they are associated with the positions of police officer, firefighter, Roman Catholic Church leaders and politicians in the larger Eastern Seaboard metropolitan areas. Irish Americans number over 35 million, making them the second-largest reported ethnic group in the country, after German Americans. Historically, large Irish American communities have been found in Philadelphia; Chicago; Boston; New York City; New York; Detroit; New England; Washington, D.C.; Baltimore; Pittsburgh; Cleveland; St. Paul, Minnesota; Buffalo; Broome County; Butte; Dubuque; Quincy; Dublin; Hartford; New Haven; Waterbury; Providence; Kansas City; New Orleans; Savannah; Braintree; Weymouth; Norfolk; Nashville; Scranton; Wilkes-Barre; O'Fallon; Tampa; Hazleton; Worcester; Lowell; Los Angeles; and the San Francisco Bay Area. Many cities across the country have annual St Patrick's Day parades; The nation's largest is in New York City—one of the world's largest parades. The parade in Boston is closely associated with Evacuation Day, when the British left Boston in 1776 during the American War of Independence.

Before the Great Hunger, in which over a million died and more emigrated, there had been the Penal Laws which had already resulted in significant emigration from Ireland.

According to the Harvard Encyclopedia of American Ethnic Groups, in 1790 there were 400,000 Americans of Irish birth or ancestry out of a total white population of 3,100,000. Half of these Irish Americans were descended from Ulster people, and half were descended from the people of Connacht, Leinster and Munster.

According to US census figures from 2000, 41,000,000 Americans claim to be wholly or partly of Irish ancestry, a group that represents more than one in five white Americans. Some African Americans are part of the Irish diaspora, as they are descended from Irish or Scots-Irish slave owners and overseers who arrived in America during the colonial era. The US Census Bureau's data from 2016 reveals that Irish ancestry is one of the most commonly reported ancestries. Even though Irish immigration is extremely small relative to the scope of current migration, Irish ancestry is one of the most common ancestries in the United States because of the events that took place over a century ago.

The enduring nature of Irish-American identity is exemplified by the widespread celebration of St.Patrick's Day, the national day of Ireland, across the United States. The traditional St. Patrick's Day parade having developed, in its modern form, in the United States itself. The largest such parade in the world is the New York City St. Patrick's Day Parade which features in the region of 150,000 participants and 2,000,000 spectators annually, with thousands of parades of all sizes across the United States.

== Asia ==
=== Indian Subcontinent ===
Irishmen have been known in India right from the days of the East India Company, which was founded in 1600. While most of the early Irish came as traders, some also came as soldiers. However, the majority of these traders and soldiers were from the Protestant Ascendancy. Prominent among them were the generals Arthur Wellesley, 1st Duke of Wellington (1769–1852) who became Prime Minister of the United Kingdom in 1834 and his brother Richard Wellesley, 1st Marquess Wellesley (1760–1842), who was Governor-General of India (1798–1805). Later in the Victorian period, many thinkers, philosophers and Irish nationalists from the Roman Catholic majority too made it to India, prominent among the nationalists being the theosophist Annie Besant.

It is widely believed that there existed a secret alliance between the Irish and Indian independence movements. Some Indian intellectuals like Jawaharlal Nehru and V. V. Giri were certainly inspired by Irish nationalists when they studied in the United Kingdom. The Indian revolutionary group known as the Bengal Volunteers took this name in emulation of the Irish Volunteers.

- Derek O'Brien, quiz master turned Member of Parliament in Indian state of West Bengal.
- Michael John O'Brian is an eminent Air Vice-Marshall of Pakistan Air Force.

== Australia ==
People with Irish ancestry as a percentage of the population in Australia divided geographically by statistical local area, as of the 2011 census

2,087,800 Australians, 10.4% of the population, self-reported some Irish ancestry in the 2011 census, second only to English and Australian. The Australian government estimates the total figure may be around 7 million (30%).

In the 2006 census 50,255 Australian residents declared they were born in the Republic of Ireland and a further 21,291 declared to have been born in Northern Ireland. This gives Australia the third largest Irish-born population outside Ireland (after Britain and America).

Between the 1790s and 1920s, approximately 400,000 Irish settlers – both voluntary and forced – are thought to have arrived in Australia. They first came over in large numbers as convicts, with around 50,000 transported between 1791 and 1867. Even larger numbers of free settlers came during the 19th century due to famine, the Donegal Relief Fund, the discovery of gold in Victoria and New South Wales, and the increasing "pull" of a pre-existing Irish community. By 1871, Irish immigrants accounted for one quarter of Australia's overseas-born population.

Irish Catholic immigrants – who made up about 75% of the total Irish population – were largely responsible for the establishment of a separate Catholic school system. About 20% of Australian children attend Catholic schools as of 2017.

It has also been argued that the Irish language was the source of a significant number of words in Australian English.

== South Africa ==
Though they've never formed a substantial population, some Irish communities can be found in Cape Town, Port Elizabeth, Kimberley, and Johannesburg, with smaller communities in Pretoria, Barberton, Durban, and East London. A third of the Cape's governors were Irish, as were many of the judges and politicians. Both the Cape Colony and the Colony of Natal had Irish prime ministers: Sir Thomas Upington, "The Afrikaner from Cork"; and Sir Albert Hime, from Kilcoole in County Wicklow. Irish Cape Governors included Lord Macartney, Lord Caledon and Sir John Francis Cradock. Henry Nourse, a shipowner at the Cape, brought out a small party of Irish settlers in 1818. Many Irish were with the 1820 British settlers in the Eastern Cape frontier with the Xhosa. In 1823, John Ingram brought out 146 Irish from Cork. Single Irish women were sent to the Cape on a few occasions. Twenty arrived in November 1849 and 46 arrived in March 1851. The majority arrived in November 1857 aboard Lady Kennaway. A large contingent of Irish troops fought in the Anglo-Boer War on both sides and a few of them stayed in South Africa after the war. Others returned home but later came out to settle in South Africa with their families. Between 1902 and 1905, there were about 5,000 Irish immigrants. Places in South Africa named after Irish people include Upington, Porterville, Caledon, Cradock, Sir Lowry's Pass, the Biggarsberg Mountains, Donnybrook, Himeville and Belfast.

James Rorke was of Irish parentage and was the founder of Rorkes's drift.

== New Zealand ==
The diaspora population of Ireland also got a fresh start on the islands of New Zealand during the 19th century. The possibility of striking it rich in the gold mines caused many Irish people to flock to the docks; risking their lives on the long voyage to potential freedom and more importantly self-sufficiency, many Irish also came with the British army during the New Zealand wars. Several places, including Gabriel's Gully and Otago, were mining sites which, with the funding of large companies, allowed for the creation of wages and the appearance of mining towns. Women found jobs as housemaids cleaning the shacks of the single men at work thereby providing a second income to the Irish family household. The subsequent money accumulated with regards to this would allow for chain migration for the rest of the family left behind.

The transition to New Zealand was made easier due to the overexposure that the Irish had previously had with colonialism. They ventured upwards to the British ports, settling temporarily to accumulate the necessary finances before moving onwards towards the banks of the far away island. In doing so, they not only exposed themselves to the form of British form of government but likewise to capitalism. This aided to further the simplicity of the transition for the dispersed population.

The government aided through the use of both promissory notes and land grants. By promising to pay for the passage of a family the government ensured that the island would be populated and a British colony would be formed. Free passage was installed for women first between the ages of 15 and 35, while males between the ages of 18 and 40 years of age would be promised a certain number of acres of land upon arrival in the New World. This was attributed to the installment of the New Zealand Land act. To further aid with the financial burden, free passage to any immigrant was granted after 1874.

The Irish diaspora population in New Zealand also resulted in a diminished amount of prejudice against Roman Catholicism compared to that in other British colonies. The lack of embedded hierarchy and social structure allowed for previous sectarian tensions to be dissolved. This can also be attributed to the sheer amount of distance between the respective religions due to the sparseness of the unpopulated area and the sheer size of the islands.

== List of countries by population of Irish heritage ==
Country	Population	% of country	Criterion
Irish American	33,348,049	11%	Self-identified "Irish"; 33,348,049; 11% of the US population (2013); Scots–Irish Americans; 27 to 30 million Up to 10% of the U.S. population 5,827,046 (Self-reported only, 2008); 2% of the total U.S. population
Irish Canadian	4,544,870	14%	
Irish Mexican	10,000	0.1%	
Irish Argentine	1,000,000	3%	– 1,000,000
Irish Chilean	120,000	0.7%	
Irish Uruguayan	120,000	4%	
Irish British	14,000,000	10%	869,093 Irish-born (1% of the British population) c. 6 million with at least 25% Irish ancestry (10% of the British population)
Northern Irish	828,220	45%	
Irish-Scots	1,500,000	28%	
Irish Australian	7,000,000	30%	7,000,000 (30% of the Australian population of partial Irish ancestry); 80,000 (by birth, 2011); 2,087,800 (self-declared Irish ancestry, 2011; 10% of the Australian population)
Irish people	4,577,072	85%	

== Religion ==
Paul Cardinal Cullen set out to spread Irish dominance over the English-speaking Roman Catholic Church in the 19th century. The establishment of an 'Irish Episcopal Empire' involved three transnational entities – the British Empire, the Roman Catholic Church, and the Irish diaspora. Irish clergy, notably Cullen, made particular use of the reach of the British Empire to spread their influence. From the 1830s until his death in 1878, Cullen held several key positions near the top of the Irish hierarchy and influenced Rome's appointment of Irish bishops on four continents.

Walker (2007) compares Irish immigrant communities in the United States, Australia, New Zealand, Canada, and Great Britain respecting issues of identity and 'Irishness.' Religion remained the major cause of differentiation in all Irish diaspora communities and had the greatest impact on identity, followed by the nature and difficulty of socio-economic conditions faced in each new country and the strength of continued social and political links of Irish immigrants and their descendants with Ireland.

In the United States specifically, Irish immigrants were persecuted because of their religion. The Know Nothing Movement sprung up during the time of the Irish's arrival. The Know Nothing Party was formed by Protestants and was the first political party in American history to push against Catholic immigration to the United States, particularly targeting Irish and German immigrants. The Know Nothings fought to limit immigration from traditional Catholic countries, prohibit non-English language speaking on US territory, and create a policy where you must spend 21 years in the US before gaining citizenship. The party faded out of existence relatively quickly, but they are a reminder of the persecution Irish immigrants faced. During the third and fourth waves of immigration, new arrivals faced similar discrimination and the now settled Irish would take part in this persecution of other groups.

From the late 20th century onward, Irish identity abroad became increasingly cultural, non-denominational, and non-political, although many emigrants from Northern Ireland stood apart from this trend. However, Ireland as religious reference point is now increasingly significant in neopagan contexts.

== See also ==
Irish Brigade

- Irish Brigade (French) formed from the Irish army after the flight of the Wild Geese in 1691.
- 1st Regiment Venezuelan Rifles – Irish regiment that took part in the Venezuelan War of Independence.
- The Irish Battalion, or Los San Patricio, who fought on the side of Mexico against the US invasion of 1846–48.
- Irish Brigade (Union Army) served on the Union side in the American Civil War in the 1860s.
- Tyneside Irish Brigade, World War I brigade serving in the British army at the Somme.
- Irish military diaspora, notable individuals, Irish by birth or extraction, who served in non-Irish military forces.
- Irish regiments, many Irish regiments served in non-Irish military forces and took part in several conflicts of world history.

Causes of Irish emigration

- Flight of the Earls
- Cromwellian conquest of Ireland
- The Penal Laws affecting non-Conformists (c. 1715–1869)
- Irish Famine (1740–41)
- Great Irish Famine (1845–1851)
- Irish Famine (1879)
- Economic history of Ireland
- Economic history of the Republic of Ireland
- The Economic War, 1933–1938
- "The Emergency" (Ireland during World War II)
- "The Troubles" (c. 1969–1998)
- Post-2008 Irish economic downturn

General

- List of expatriate Irish populations
- Irish Travellers
- Irish military diaspora
- List of Ireland-related topics
- Irish place names in other countries
- The Gathering Ireland 2013
- Liverpool Irish
- Coatbridge Irish
- Against the Wind (TV series)
- EPIC The Irish Emigration Museum
