= White Caribbean people =

Racial and multi-ethnic group

White Caribbean or European Caribbean is the term for people who are born in the Caribbean whose ancestors are from Europe or people who emigrated to the Caribbean from Europe and had acquired citizenship in their respective Caribbean countries.

The first Europeans to arrive in the Caribbean were Spaniards who discovered Hispaniola. Many whites came to the Caribbean during the colonial era. Some white Caribbean people descend from Indentured servants transported from Ireland and to a lesser extent other European countries, where they worked on tobacco and cotton plantations. Some of them were political prisoners and criminals, especially in Barbados.

== History ==
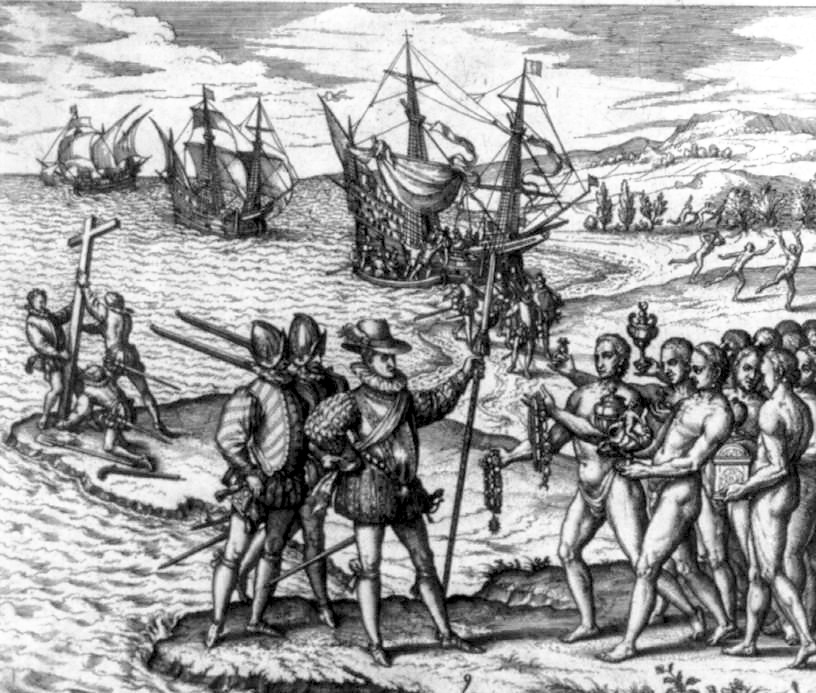
Columbus greeted by Arawak Indians

The Indigenous peoples of the Caribbean were exterminated by white colonists. The initial tribe that the Spanish colonizers and Christopher Columbus came across in the Caribbean was the Taíno tribe. European colonizers transported Africans to the Caribbean following the genocide of the Indigenous population. In the Caribbean, black slaves were owned by white individuals. The European powers that colonized the Caribbean included Spain, England, the Netherlands, and France. White men often raped Native American women and Black women in the Caribbean.

== Related articles ==
White Caribbean people include:

- White Antiguans and Barbudans
- Béké
- White Bahamians
- White Barbadians
  - Irish Barbadians
- Jewish Barbadians
- White Belizeans
- White Bermudians
- White Caymanians
- White Cubans
  - Spanish Cubans
  - Italian Cubans
  - French Cubans
- White Dominicans (Dominica)
- White Dominicans (Dominican Republic)
  - Jewish Dominicans
- White Guyanese
  - Portuguese Guyanese
- White Haitians
  - French Haitians
  - German Haitians
  - Italian Haitians
  - Polish Haitians
  - Jewish Haitians
- White Jamaicans
  - German Jamaicans
  - Irish Jamaicans
  - Scottish Jamaicans
  - Spanish Jamaicans
  - Portuguese Jamaicans
- White Kittitians and Nevisians
  - Irish Kittitans and Nevisians
- White Puerto Ricans
  - German Puerto Ricans
  - French Puerto Ricans
  - Irish Puerto Ricans
  - Jewish Puerto Ricans
- White Surinamese
  - Dutch Surinamese
  - Portuguese Surinamese
- White Trinidadians and Tobagonians
  - Portuguese Trinidadians and Tobagonians

== See also ==
- White people
- History of the Caribbean
  - Spanish West Indies
- History of the Jews in Latin America and the Caribbean
- Irish indentured servitude in the Caribbean
- Afro-Caribbean people
- Caribbean people
- White Latin Americans
  - Spanish diaspora
