= Demographics of Barbados =

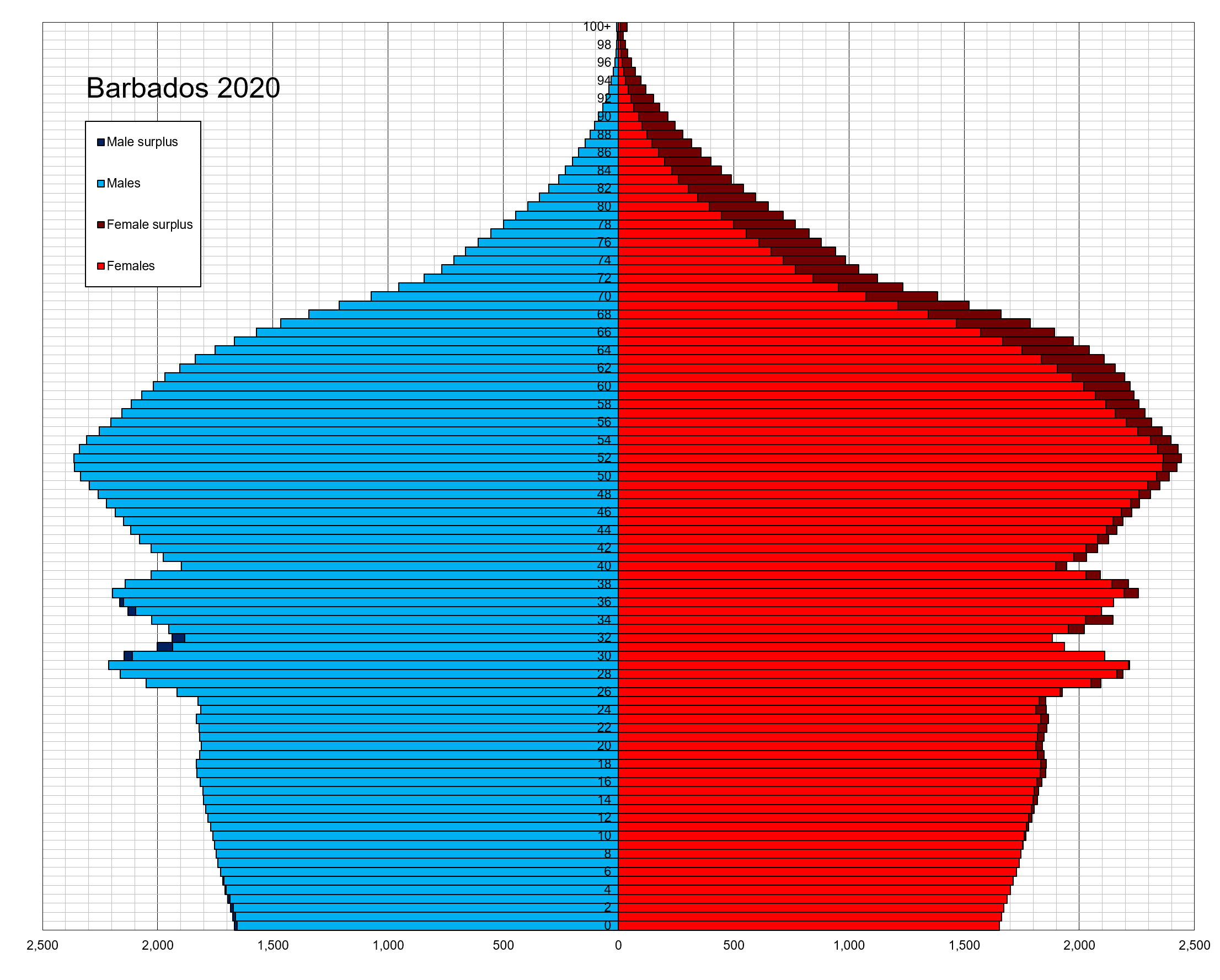
- Barbados population pyramid in 2020
- Population: 281,200
- Growth rate: 0.24% (2023 est.)
- Birth rate: 10.73 births/1,000 population (2023 est.)
- Death rate: 8.03 deaths/1,000 population (2023 est.)
- Life expectancy: 78.79 years
  - male: 76.04 years
  - female: 81.57 years (2023 est.)
- Fertility rate: 1.7 children born/woman (2023 est.)
- Infant mortality: 9.79 deaths/1,000 live births (2023 est.)
- Net migration rate: -0.29 migrant(s)/1,000 population (2023 est.)
- Immigrant share: 12.5% (2024)

Age structure
- 0–14 years: ▼17.1% (2025 est.)
- 15–64 years: ▼65.8% (2025 est.)
- 65 and over: ▲17.1% (2025 est.)

Sex ratio
- Total: 0.93 male(s)/female (2023 est.)
- At birth: 1.01 male(s)/female
- Under 15: 1 male(s)/female
- 15–64 years: 0.97 male(s)/female
- 65 and over: 0.72 male(s)/female

Nationality
- Nationality: Barbadians
- Major ethnic: African descent 92.4% (2010 est.)
- Minor ethnic: Mixed 3.1%, White 2.7%, East Indian 1.3%, other 0.2%, unspecified 0.3% (2010 est.)

Language
- Official: English (official), Bajan (English-based creole language, widely spoken in informal settings)

This is a demography of Barbados including population density, ethnicity, education level, health of the populace, economic status, religious affiliations and other aspects of the population.

== Population ==
Barbados's population (1960–2010).

At the 2010 census Barbados had an estimated population of 277,821. The tabulated population was only 226,193 due to a high undercount (estimated at 18%). The estimated population of 2021 is 281,200 (the 2022 revision of the World Population Prospects).

Census population and average annual growth rate
Year	Pop.	±% p.a.
1844	122,198	—
1851	135,939	+1.53%
1861	152,727	+1.17%
1871	162,042	+0.59%
1881	171,860	+0.59%
1891	182,867	+0.62%
1911	172,337	−0.30%
1921	156,774	−0.94%
1946	192,800	+0.83%
1960	232,327	+1.34%
1970	236,891	+0.19%
1980	247,129	+0.42%
1990	260,491	+0.53%
2000	268,792	+0.31%
2010	277,821	+0.33%

=== Structure of the population ===
Population by Sex and Age Group (Census 01.V.2010) (Data refers to resident population adjusted for the undercount of 18 per cent and including the institutional population.):

Age group	Male	Female	Total	%
Total	133 018	144 803	277 821	100
0–4	8 873	8 479	17 352	6.25
5–9	9 683	9 155	18 838	6.78
10–14	9 445	9 122	18 567	6.68
15–19	9 452	9 418	18 870	6.79
20–24	9 061	9 108	18 169	6.54
25–29	9 313	9 775	19 088	6.87
30–34	9 150	9 635	18 785	6.76
35–39	9 884	10 632	20 516	7.38
40–44	9 663	10 450	20 113	7.24
45–49	10 062	11 303	21 365	7.69
50–54	9 411	10 639	20 050	7.22
55–59	7 871	8 782	16 653	5.99
60–64	6 326	7 160	13 486	4.85
65–69	4 511	5 640	10 151	3.65
70–74	3 804	4 876	8 680	3.12
75–79	2 863	4 074	6 937	2.50
80–84	1 986	3 167	5 153	1.85
85+	1 660	3 388	5 048	1.82
Age group	Male	Female	Total	Percent
0–14	28 001	26 756	54 757	19.71
15–64	90 193	96 902	187 095	67.34
65+	14 824	21 145	35 969	12.95

== Vital statistics ==
	Average population	Live births	Deaths	Natural change	Crude birth rate (per 1000)	Crude death rate (per 1000)	Natural change (per 1000)	Infant mortality rate	TFR
1934	166 000	5 380	4 176	1 204	32.4	25.2	7.3		
1935	168 000	5 315	3 702	1 613	31.6	22.0	9.6		4.75
1936	170 000	5 933	3 459	2 474	34.9	20.3	14.6		
1937	173 000	5 670	3 511	2 159	32.8	20.3	12.5	217.0	
1938	175 000	5 327	3 743	1 584	30.4	21.4	9.1	222.0	
1939	177 000	5 497	3 380	2 117	31.1	19.1	12.0		
1940	179 000	5 784	3 305	2 479	32.3	18.5	13.8		
1941	179 000	5 786	3 902	1 884	32.3	21.8	10.5		
1942	180 000	5 586	3 275	2 311	31.0	18.2	12.8		
1943	182 000	5 877	3 104	2 773	32.3	17.1	15.2		
1944	183 000	5 928	3 341	2 587	32.4	18.3	14.1		
1945	187 000	6 047	3 164	2 883	32.3	16.9	15.4		5.13
1946	193 000	6 175	3 289	2 886	32.0	17.0	15.0	160.0	
1947	197 000	6 425	3 204	3 221	32.6	16.3	16.4	171.0	
1948	202 000	6 517	3 141	3 376	32.3	15.5	16.7	154.0	
1949	206 000	6 357	2 979	3 378	30.9	14.5	16.4	133.0	
1950	211 000	6 432	2 688	3 744	30.5	12.7	17.7	125.0	
1951	216 000	6 793	3 000	3 793	31.5	13.9	17.6	136.0	
1952	220 000	7 291	3 186	4 105	33.2	14.5	18.7	145.0	
1953	223 000	7 304	2 997	4 307	32.8	13.5	19.3	139.0	
1954	225 000	7 576	2 544	5 032	33.6	11.3	22.3	109.0	
1955	227 000	7 593	2 887	4 706	33.4	12.7	20.7	134.0	4.48
1956	228 000	7 082	2 430	4 652	31.0	10.6	20.4	97.0	
1957	229 000	7 314	2 469	4 845	31.9	10.8	21.1	87.0	
1958	230 000	7 115	2 298	4 817	31.0	10.0	21.0	82.0	
1959	230 000	7 110	2 084	5 026	30.9	9.1	21.8	71.0	
1960	231 000	7 833	2 127	5 706	33.9	9.2	24.7	60.0	
1961	232 000	6 754	2 410	4 344	29.2	10.4	18.8	84.0	
1962	233 000	6 881	2 116	4 765	29.6	9.1	20.5	54.0	
1963	234 000	6 756	2 090	4 666	28.9	8.9	20.0	61.0	
1964	234 000	6 506	2 127	4 379	27.7	9.1	18.7	53.0	
1965	235 000	6 358	1 905	4 453	27.0	8.1	18.9	39.0	3.56
1966	236 000	6 319	2 012	4 307	26.8	8.5	18.3	48.0	3.52
1967	236 000	5 455	2 047	3 408	23.1	8.7	14.4	54.0	3.14
1968	237 000	5 474	2 045	3 429	23.1	8.6	14.5	46.0	3.15
1969	238 000	5 196	1 987	3 209	21.9	8.4	13.5	42.0	2.91
1970	239 000	4 883	2 064	2 819	20.5	8.6	11.8	45.0	2.77
1971	240 000	5 177	2 058	3 119	21.6	8.6	13.0	29.0	2.90
1972	241 000	5 303	2 045	3 258	22.0	8.5	13.5	35.0	3.04
1973	243 000	5 084	2 287	2 797	20.9	9.4	11.5	33.0	2.88
1974	244 000	4 851	2 107	2 744	19.8	8.6	11.2	31.0	2.71
1975	246 000	4 683	2 147	2 536	19.1	8.7	10.3	33.0	2.53
1976	247 000	4 593	2 266	2 327	18.6	9.2	9.4	28.0	2.40
1977	247 000	4 326	2 144	2 182	17.5	8.7	8.8	25.0	2.27
1978	248 000	4 304	2 087	2 217	17.4	8.4	9.0	27.0	2.04
1979	248 000	4 269	2 128	2 141	17.2	8.6	8.6	24.0	1.94
1980	249 000	4 148	2 012	2 136	16.7	8.1	8.6	24.5	1.83
1981	250 500	4 413	1 878	2 535	17.7	7.5	10.2	16.0	1.92
1982	251 200	4 499	2 003	2 496	17.9	8.0	10.0	21.3	1.94
1983	251 800	4 496	2 068	2 428	17.8	8.2	9.6	24.5	1.94
1984	255 800	4 214	1 976	2 238	16.6	7.8	8.8	18.4	1.85
1985	257 000	4 281	2 127	2 154	16.8	8.4	8.5	17.8	1.86
1986	258 000	4 043	2 160	1 883	15.8	8.5	7.4	19.0	1.81
1987	258 800	3 828	2 195	1 633	14.9	8.6	6.4	22.3	1.76
1988	259 400	3 745	2 233	1 512	14.5	8.7	5.9	19.5	1.74
1989	260 300	4 015	2 277	1 738	15.5	8.8	6.7	18.2	1.81
1990	260 800	4 313	2 232	2 081	16.6	8.6	8.0	15.5	1.85
1991	262 500	4 240	2 283	1 957	16.3	8.8	7.5	15.3	1.84
1992	263 100	4 185	2 361	1 824	16.0	9.0	7.0	13.8	1.82
1993	263 900	3 781	2 391	1 390	14.4	9.1	5.3	9.8	1.75
1994	264 300	3 547	2 295	1 252	13.5	8.7	4.8	8.5	1.70
1995	264 400	3 473	2 481	992	13.2	9.4	3.8	13.2	1.68
1996	264 600	3 519	2 400	1 119	13.3	9.1	4.2	14.2	1.69
1997	266 100	3 784	2 297	1 487	14.3	8.7	5.6	13.2	1.72
1998	266 800	3 612	2 471	1 141	13.6	9.3	4.3	7.8	1.66
1999	267 400	3 882	2 428	1 454	14.6	9.1	5.5	10.0	1.71
2000	268 800	3 642	2 444	1 198	14.0	9.1	5.0	17.0	1.70
2001	269 900	4 052	2 408	1 644	15.0	8.9	6.1	15.8	1.69
2002	270 800	3 828	2 300	1 528	14.1	8.5	5.6	14.4	1.69
2003	271 600	3 768	2 283	1 485	13.8	8.4	5.4	9.9	1.67
2004	272 400	3 474	2 435	1 039	12.7	8.9	3.8	18.4	1.60
2005	273 000	3 511	2 169	1 342	12.6	7.9	4.9	8.3	1.58
2006	273 400	3 415	2 296	1 119	12.4	8.5	3.9	11.1	1.56
2007	274 200	3 536	2 213	1 323	12.9	8.1	4.8	13.0	1.57
2008	274 800	3 546	2 475	1 071	12.9	9.0	3.9	18.3	1.57
2009	275 400	3 554	2 433	1 121	12.9	8.8	4.1	8.7	1.57
2010	277 800	3 443	2 198	1 245	12.2	8.0	4.2	10.1	1.54
2011	277 800	3 110	2 300	810	11.8	8.8	3.0	13.7	1.53
2012	277 700	3 175	2 321	854	11.5	8.7	2.8	11.0	1.51
2013	277 500	3 271	2 456	815	10.9	8.2	2.7	7.3	1.49
2014	277 100	2 907	2 590	317	10.5	9.3	1.2	10.0	1.47
2015	276 600	2 877	2 570	307	10.4	9.2	1.2	8.0	1.41
2016	275 900	2 546	2 584	-38	9.2	9.4	-0.2	13.5	1.25
2017	274 900	2 945	2 634	311	10.7	9.6	1.1	8.9	1.44
2018	273 800	2 416	2 388	28	8.7	8.7	0.0	9.1	1.19
2019	272 900	2 591	2 896	-305	9.5	10.6	-1.1	7.3	1.28
2020	271 400	2 356	2 713	-357	8.7	10.0	-1.3	6.4	1.16
2021	270 200	2 210	2 895	-685	8.2	10.7	-2.5	11.3	1.09
2022	268 700	2 279	3 354	-1 075	8.5	12.5	-4.0	9.2	1.13
2023		1 601	2 532	-931					0.81
2024		1 995	3 008	-1 013					1.02
2025	261 692	1 915	3 113	-1 198	7.3	11.9	-4.6		0.98

Numbers after 2015 are calculated based on the live births provided they could have a margin of error of +/- 0.02

== Ethnic groups ==
The population of Barbados is predominantly black (91%) or mixed (4%). 3.5% of the population is white and 1% South Asian. The remaining 0.5% of the population includes East Asians (0.1%).

== Languages ==
English is the official language of Barbados, and is used for communications, administration, and public services all over the island. In its capacity as the official language of the country, the standard of English tends to conform to the vocabulary, pronunciations, spellings, and conventions akin to, but not exactly the same as, those of British English.

A regional variant of English referred to locally as Bajan is spoken by most Barbadians in everyday life especially in informal settings. In its full-fledged form, Bajan sounds markedly different from the Standard English heard on the island. The degree of intelligibility between Bajan and general English depends on the level of creolised vocabulary and idioms. A Bajan speaker may be completely unintelligible to an English speaker from another country. Bajan is influenced by other Caribbean English dialects.

== Religion ==
According to the 2010 census, 75.6% of the population of Barbados are considered Christian, 2.6% have a non-Christian religion and 20.6% have no religion.

Anglicanism constitutes the largest religious group, with 23.9% of the population. It is represented by the Church in the Province of the West Indies, within which the island belongs to the Diocese of Barbados. Pentecostals are the second largest group (19.5%).

The next largest group are Seventh-day Adventists, 5.9% of the population, followed by Methodists (4.2%). 3.8% of the population are Roman Catholics. Other Christians include Wesleyans (3.4%), Nazarenes (3.2%), Church of God (2.4%), Jehovah's Witnesses (2.0%), Baptists (1.8), Moravians (1.2%), Brethren Christian (0.5%), the Salvationists (0.4%) and Latter-day Saints ( 0.1%).

The number of non-Christians is small. 0.7% of the population are Muslims, most of whom are immigrants or descendants of Indian immigrants from the Indian state of Gujarat. There are three mosques and an Islamic centre. Other religious groups include the Rastafarians (1.0% of the population), which was introduced to Barbados in 1975, Hindus (0.5%), Jews (0.05%), the Baháʼís (0.04%) and Buddhists.

== See also ==
- Afro-Barbadian
- Indians in Barbados
- Irish immigration to Barbados
- White Barbadian
- List of supercentenarians by continent
