= White Barbadians =

Ethnic group in Barbados

White Barbadians or European Barbadians are Barbadian citizens or residents of European descent. The majority of European Barbadians are descended from English, Portuguese, and Scottish settlers and Irish indentured servants and settlers, who arrived during the British colonial period. Other European groups consisted of the French, Germans, Austrians, Spaniards, Italians, and Russians. In addition, some of those considered to be European Barbadians are of partial European ancestry and vice versa. The CIA World Factbook estimates that there are some 20,000 white Barbadians in the country.

At first, Indigenous constituted the majority of the Barbadian population. With colonization, Europeans came to constitute the majority, with the island being used as a penal colony much as Australia would be later, until the transition of the Barbadian economy to one based on sugarcane production; importation of African slaves to the island altered its demographics, making European Barbadians a minority. During much of the colonial period, whites formed the island's political and economic elite. Since independence from Britain in 1966 when most European Barbadians left for the United Kingdom, most political power has shifted to the black majority.

Among European Barbadians, there exists an underclass of predominantly Irish descent known as redlegs; the descendants of indentured servants, and prisoners imported to the island, redlegs have historically formed a disadvantaged group within Barbadian society.

== History ==
The Spanish were the first Europeans to discover and land in Barbados. The Spanish regularly seized large numbers of Amerindians from Barbados to be used as slave labour on other regional plantations. This prompted the Kalinago to flee Barbados for other Caribbean destinations such as Dominica and St. Vincent. Europeans caused the disappearance of the indigenous people in Barbados. The first white European settlement on Barbados consisted of British colonists. European colonists brought Gypsy slaves to Barbados.

== Notable European Barbadians ==
- Sir James Drax (d. 1662), a pioneer sugar grower and 'plantocrat' (born in England before settling in Barbados)
- Theodorious Paleologus (c. 1660–1693), sailor and privateer, last surviving male descendant of the Paleologus dynasty, rulers of the Byzantine Empire from 1259 to its fall in 1453.
- Stede Bonnet (1688–1718), pirate, known as the "Gentleman Pirate"
- Neville Goddard (1905-1972), author and mystic
- Robert Lettis Hooper (d. 1738/9), politician and jurist in colonial New Jersey
- Humphrey Fleming Senhouse (1781–1841), officer of the Royal Navy
- Tony Cozier (10 July 1940 – 11 May 2016), journalist and West Indian Cricket Commentator
- Zane Maloney (b. 2003), racing driver
- Ward Simpson, businessman
- Jacob Bethell, cricketer
- Norman Marshall (1924-2007), cricketer
- Roy Marshall (1930-1992), cricketer

== See also ==
- Barbadians
- White people
- Demographics of Barbados
- Irish immigration to Barbados
- Irish indentured servants
- History of the Jews in Barbados
