= Irish immigration to Saint Kitts and Nevis =

Irish people began migrating to Saint Kitts and Nevis in the 1620s as indentured servants and merchants, when the islands of Saint Kitts and Nevis became part of the British Empire, and continued into the 18th century.

== 1620s to 1642 ==
The first English colony was established in 1623, followed by a French colony in 1625. The English and French briefly united for the Kalinago Genocide of 1626 (pre-empting a Kalinago plan to massacre the Europeans), and then partitioned the island, with the English colonists in the middle and the French on either end. A Spanish force sent to clear the islands of non-Spanish settlement led to the Battle of St. Kitts (1629). The English settlement was rebuilt following the 1630 peace between England and Spain.

The Irish emigrated to the islands with the English, both as merchants and Irish indentured servants. One of the earliest known Irish settlers, merchant Gregory French of Galway, was there in 1630 when tried for "certain speeches ... tending to the dishonour" of King Charles I. In an incident at Kinsale in 1634, Irish emigrants were "ready to go ... to the West Indies ..[on a ship which] could have carried 150 passengers thence, for which passage there is commonly paid £6 per head ... and the freight of goods from Ireland to St Christopher, or other parts of the West Indies, is £3 to £4 per ton."

According to Matteo Binasco,

The English Caribbean received a growing influx of white settlers, whose number, before 1660, was estimated to be around 190,000. This emigration pattern was largely dictated by the absence of a large native population that could be used as a labour force, and consequently, the islands needed indentured servants . A considerable number of these indentured servants were Irish, who, in the 1630s, began to be recruited to work in the English West Indies (Bridenbaugh 1972: 14) ... and decided to improve their economic and social conditions.

Citing as typical the case of Captain Thomas Anthony, forced in 1636 by his Irish passengers to change his course from Virginia to St. Christopher the West Indies, Akenson writes:

"Irish labourers were well informed about comparatives wage rates and knew they would be better paid in the West Indies than in Virginia. So Captain Anthony was forced to change his plans and to make St. Christopher his destination; this is where most of them wanted to go."

In March 1638, Archbishop of Tuam Malachy Ó Caollaidhe sent two priests, Ferdinand Fareissy and David O’Neill, to accompany "six hundred Irish of both sexes [who] came to those parts, thanks to a safe and functional communication line, recently established." It was believed that the mission would be a success because of "the scarce presence of Protestant ministers."

== Warfare, transportation, and the introduction of African slavery ==
Irish emigration was disrupted during the Irish Confederate Wars. In its aftermath, around 10,000 Irish and an unknown number of English, Welsh, and Scots were transported as convicts and prisoners of war to colonies in British North America, including Saint Kitts and Nevis. While Irish immigration continued, the rise of the Atlantic slave trade in Africans brought indenture wages down and forced many to leave the islands for mainland North America. Some former indentures remained and became slave-owners.

According to Nini Rogers:

"The irony of the Irish as ‘colonised and coloniser’ is intellectually disturbing to readers in a later generation; it was not so to the actual participants. Needy Catholic gentry, landless swordsmen, particularly from the provinces of Connacht and Munster, might look west to recoup their losses. The earliest surviving Irish emigrant letter from the New World comes from the Blake brothers on Barbados and Montserrat, conventionally carrying messages home to Galway of the good living to be made in a new land."

== See also ==
- Irish immigration to Barbados
- Irish people in Jamaica
- Irish indentured servants
- Irish slaves myth
- Redlegs

== Other sources ==
- "A "riotous and Unruly Lot": Irish Indentured Servants and Freemen in the English West Indies, 1644-1713, in The William and Mary Quarterly 47, no. 4, Hilary Beckles, 1990.
- If the Irish Ran the World: Montserrat, 1630-1730, Donald Harman Akenson, 1997
- Subjects Without an Empire: The Irish in the Early Modern Caribbean, Past and Present, Kristen Block, 2011.
- Everyday Life in the Early English Caribbean: Irish, Africans, and the Construction of Difference, Jenny Shaw, University of Georgia Press, 2013.
