= Donald Akenson =

American historian and author (born 1941)

Donald Harman Akenson (born May 22, 1941, Minneapolis, Minnesota) is an American historian and author. He is a fellow of both the Royal Society of Canada and the Royal Historical Society (UK). He is a Molson Prize Laureate, awarded for a lifetime contribution to Canadian culture. He was awarded a Guggenheim Fellowship in 1984, and in 1992 he won the Grawemeyer Award. Akenson received his B.A. from Yale University and his doctorate from Harvard University. He is Distinguished University Professor and Douglas Professor of History at Queen's University in Kingston, Ontario, Canada, and was simultaneously Beamish Research Professor at the Institute of Irish Studies, University of Liverpool (2006–2010), and senior editor of the McGill-Queen's University Press (1982–2012).

== Irish history ==
Originally trained in economics and statistics at Yale, Akenson's mentor in the study of Irish history was John V. Kelleher, the founder of the Department of Celtic Languages and Literature at Harvard. Akenson's early works in Irish history focused on the religious history of Ireland, particularly the history of the Church of Ireland, and on the history of Irish education, with an emphasis on how educational practices either tended to heal or to further engender sectarian strife. Brian Titley wrote of Akenson's efforts in the chronicling of Irish education that "until it attracted the attention of D.H. Akenson, the writing of Irish educational history was moribund, amateurish and narrow in both scope and sympathy."

Akenson then moved to the study of the Irish diaspora. He became known to many Irish-American scholars in 1984 and 1985 when in his The Irish In Ontario (1984) and Being Had: Historians, Evidence, and the Irish in North America (1985) he controversially called for (1) historians of Irish immigration in North America to make use of the better-documented Canadian data on Irish immigration and (2) historians to recognize that the long practice of ignoring Irish Protestant migration, particularly in the nineteenth century, was at best a foolish mistake and at worst a case of scholarly bigotry. Having called into question many, if not all, of the most-dearly clung to assumptions of traditional scholars of Irish immigration in America, an all-out scholarly war ensued, and Akenson made his case again in 1996 with The Irish Diaspora: A Primer. In this latter work, and indeed as in all of his books, Akenson pulls no punches.

In 1990, the Social Sciences and Humanities Research Council of Canada named The Irish in Ontario (1984) "one of the most important publications in social science in the past 50 years in Canada," and in 1994 Akenson was named the winner of the Trillium Book Award for his biography of Irish writer and politician, Conor Cruise O'Brien, Conor: The Biography of Conor Cruise O'Brien (1994). Of his latest contribution to the history of Irish Migration, Ireland, Sweden and the Great European Migration, 1815–1914 (2013), fellow Irish Diaspora historian Donald MacRaild wrote: "This monumental study clearly will have a huge impact in the field. Typically of Akenson, an original thinker of the first order, it debunks many myths, half-truths, and lazy assumptions on the part of historians. However, this isn't simply a book which debunks. It isn't a tract or a treatise. Its central contribution is in offering one of the best (perhaps the very best) comparative history of European emigration."

== Religious history ==
While mostly noted as a scholar of Irish migration, Akenson is also a scholar of religious history. His book God's Peoples: Covenant and Land in South Africa, Israel, and Ulster was the winner of the 1992 Grawemeyer Award for "ideas improving world order". Library Journal named God's Peoples one of the best 30 books published in the US in all genres in 1992. Some Family: The Mormons and How Humanity Keeps Track of Itself (2007) was a finalist for the British Columbia Achievement Prize for Best Canadian Non-fiction Book; Saint Saul: A Skeleton Key to the Historical Jesus (2000) was short-listed for the Canadian Writers' Trust Prize; and Surpassing Wonder: The Invention of the Bible and the Talmuds (1998) was shortlisted for the Governor General's Awards for Non-fiction.

A senior editor at McGill-Queen's University Press for thirty years, Akenson remains the editor of McGill-Queen's Studies in the History of Religion, series two, which includes more than seventy books by scholars such as Jacob Neusner.

== Editor ==
In addition to teaching and research, Akenson was senior editor of McGill-Queen's University Press from 1982 to 2012. He was editor or founding editor of two long-running series of histories published by McGill-Queen's University Press: (1) the McGill-Queen's Studies in the History of Religion, series two (dedicated to the memory of George A. Rawlyk); (2) McGill-Queen's Studies in Ethnic History; and independently (3) Canadian Papers in Rural History. He remains the editor of the McGill-Queen's Studies in the History of Religion series.

== Academic degrees ==
- Ph.D. Harvard University, 1967
- Ed. M. Harvard University, 1963
- B.A. Yale College, 1962

Academic degrees (honorary):

- D. Litt (hon. causa) Victoria University, Wellington, New Zealand, 2010
- D. Litt (hon. causa) The Queen's University of Belfast, 2008
- D. Laws (hon causa) University of Regina, 2002
- D. Litt (hon. causa) University of Guelph, 2000
- D. Hum (hon. causa) Lethbridge University, 1996
- D. Litt (hon. causa) McMaster University, 1995

== Bibliography ==
- Historical Studies (Sole Author):
- The Americanization of the Apocalypse. Creating America's Own Bible. (Oxford: Oxford University Press, 2023), 520 pp.
- Exporting the Rapture. John Nelson Darby and the Victorian Conquest of North-American Evangelicalism (Oxford: Oxford University Press, 2018), 505 pp.
- Discovering the End of Time. Irish Evangelicals in the Age of Daniel O'Connell (Montreal and Kingston: McGill-Queen's University press, 2016), 537 pp.
- Ireland, Sweden and the Great European Migration, 1815-1914 (Liverpool: Liverpool University Press, and Montreal and Kingston: McGill-Queen's University Press, 2011), 293 pp.
- Some Family: The Mormons and How Humanity Keeps Track of Itself (Montreal and Kingston: McGill-Queen's University Press, 2007), 349 pp.
- Intolerance. The E.-Coli of the Human Mind (Canberra: Australian National University, 2004), 90 pp.
- Saint Saul. A Skeleton Key to the Historical Jesus (New York: Oxford University Press, and Montreal and Kingston: McGill-Queen's University Press, 2000), 346 pp. French ed. Saint Saul. Clé pour le Jésus de l'histoire (Montreal: Fides, 2004), 472 pp.
- Surpassing Wonder. The Invention of the Bible and the Talmuds (New York: Harcourt Brace; Montreal and Kingston: McGill-Queen's University Press, 1998), 658 pp.; softcover edition (Chicago: University of Chicago Press, 2001).
- If the Irish Ran the World. Montserrat, 1630-1730 (Liverpool: Liverpool University Press; Mona, Jamaica: The Press, the University of the West Indies; Montreal and Kingston: McGill-Queen's University Press, 1997), 266 pp.
- Conor: A Biography of Conor Cruise O'Brien (Ithaca: Cornell University Press and Montreal and Kingston: McGill-Queen's University Press,1994), vol. 1, Narrative, 573 pp; vol. II, Anthology, 356 pp.
- The Irish Diaspora, a Primer (Belfast: Institute of Irish Studies, The Queen's University of Belfast, and Toronto: P.D. Meany, 1993, softcover ed., 1996), 317 pp.
- God's Peoples: Covenant and Land in South Africa, Israel and Ulster (Ithaca: Cornell University Press and Montreal and Kingston: McGill-Queen's University Press, 1992), 404 pp.
- Occasional Papers on the Irish in South Africa (Grahamstown: Institute of Social and Economic Research, Rhodes University, South Africa, 1991), 101 pp.
- Half the World from Home. Perspectives on the Irish in New Zealand (Wellington: Victoria University Press, 1990), 250 pp.
- Small Differences: Irish Catholics and Irish Protestants, 1815-1921, An International Perspective (Montreal and Kingston: McGill-Queen's University Press, 1988; and Dublin: Gill and MacMillan, 1990), 236 pp.
- Being Had: Historians, Evidence and the Irish in North America (Toronto: P.D. Meany Co., 1985), 243 pp.
- The Irish in Ontario: A Study in Rural History (Montreal and Kingston: McGill-Queen's University Press, 1984), 404 pp. Second ed., 1999. Reprinted, Carleton Library Series (Classics in Canadian Historical Studies, no. 216), 2009.
- A Protestant in Purgatory. Richard Whately: Archbishop of Dublin (Hamden, Conn: published for the Conference on British Studies and for Indiana University, by Archon Books, 1981), 276 pp.
- Between Two Revolutions: Islandmagee, Co. Antrim, 1798-1920 (Toronto: P.D. Meany Co., 1979. American edition, Hamden, Conn.: Archon Books; British Isles edition, Dublin: Academy Press), 221 pp.
- A Mirror to Kathleen's Face: Education in Independent Ireland, 1922-60 (Montreal and Kingston: McGill-Queen's University Press, 1975; republished, Routledge Revivals, 2012), 240 pp.
- The United States and Ireland (Cambridge: Harvard University Press, and London: Oxford University Press, 1973), 311 pp.
- Education And Enmity: The Control of Schooling in Northern Ireland, 1920-50 (Newton Abbot: published by David and Charles Ltd., for The Institute of Irish Studies, The Queen's University of Belfast, 1973; republished, Routledge Revivals, 2012), 287 pp.
- The Church Of Ireland: Ecclesiastical Reform and Revolution, 1800-1885 (New Haven: Yale University Press, 1971), 413 pp.
- The Irish Education Experiment: The National System of Education in the Nineteenth Century (London: Routledge and Kegan Paul and Toronto: University of Toronto Press, Inc., 1969; republished, Routledge Library Editions, 2012), 432 pp.

Historical studies (joint author):

- Between Dispersion and Belonging. Global Approaches to Diaspora in Practice., edited, with Amitava Chowdhury (Montreal and Kingston: McGill-Queen's University Press., 2016), 368 pp.*
- Colonies. Canada to 1867, with five co-authors (Toronto: McGraw-Hill Ryerson Ltd., 1992), 538 pp.
- Local Poets and Social History: James Orr, Bard of Ballycarry, with W.H. Crawford (Belfast: Public Record Office of Northern Ireland, 1977), 130 pp.
- The Changing Uses of the Liberal Arts College: An Essay in Recent Educational History, with L.F. Stevens (New York: published for Harvard College by Pageant Press, Inc., 1969), 119 pp.

Novels and historical fiction:

- An Irish History of Civilization (London: Granta Publications: 2005-2006; Montreal and Kingston: McGill-Queen's University Press, 2005), vol. 1, 828 pp; vol. 2, 696 pp.
- At Face Value. The Life and Times of Eliza McCormac/John White (Montreal and Kingston: McGill-Queen's University Press, 1990), 245 pp.
- The Edgerston Audit (New York: Walker and Co., 1987), 242 pp. ISBN 978-0-8027-0991-2.
- The Orangeman: The Life and Times of Ogle Gowan (Toronto: Lorimer, 1986), 330 pp. ISBN 978-0-88862-963-0.
- Brotherhood Week in Belfast (Toronto: ECW Press, 1984), 113 pp.
- The Lazar House Notebooks (Montreal: Quadrant Editions, 1981), 96 pp.
