= Irish people in Jamaica =

Jamaican citizens of Irish ancestry

Irish Jamaicans Gael-hIamáice
Regions with significant populations
- Portland · Saint Thomas · Saint Andrew · Saint Catherine · Manchester

Languages
- Jamaican English, Irish (historical), Ulster Scots (historical)

Related ethnic groups
- Irish diaspora, White Jamaican

Irish people in Jamaica or Irish Jamaicans, are Jamaican citizens whose ancestors originated from Ireland. If counted separately, Irish people would be the second-largest reported ethnic group in Jamaica, after Afro-Jamaicans.

== Historical background ==
The first wave of Irish immigrants occurred in the early 17th century, principally sailors, servants, and merchants. Many of the poorer emigrants were displaced Gaelic-Irish and Norman-Irish Catholics, as well as convicts who were indentured servants. Many of the indentured servants were transported unwillingly. Of those surviving the long journey, many more succumbed to disease, the harsh conditions and unfamiliar tropical conditions.

== First contact with Jamaica ==
Irish-born prisoners and indentured servants were first brought to Jamaica in large numbers under the English republic of Oliver Cromwell following the capture of Jamaica from the Spanish in 1655 by William Penn and Robert Venables as part of Cromwell's strategic plan to dominate the Caribbean: the "Western Design".

In 1655, Henry Cromwell, Major-General of the Parliamentary Army in Ireland, arranged for the transportation of approximately 1,000 Irish girls and 1,000 Irish young men be sent to assist in the colonisation of Jamaica.

== Later history ==
In 1731, governor of Jamaica Robert Hunter said that the "servants and people of lower rank on the island chiefly consist of Irish Papists" who he said had "been pouring in upon us in such sholes as of late years". In the mid-18th century, Irish native names such as O'Hara and O'Connor were prominent, as well as Old English families like Talbot and Martin. Names present in 1837, recorded during the compensation hearings, include Walsh, O'Meally, O'Sullivan, Burke, Hennessy, Boyle, Tierney, Geoghagan, and Dillon. Despite the large historic presence of Irish people in Jamaica, surnames of Irish origin are significantly less prevalent than names of English or Scottish origin. Burke is the only name solely associated with Ireland within the top 100 most common surnames, placing at 91. Murphy, Irelands most commonest surname places 295th.

== Cultural influences ==
The Irish Gaelic language poet Eoghan Rua Ó Súilleabháin wrote his only English-language work in Port Royal, Jamaica while serving on a Royal Navy vessel.

== Notable Jamaicans of Irish descent ==
- Bromley Armstrong, black Canadian civil rights leader
- Sir Alexander Bustamante, national hero and first prime minister of Jamaica
- Donald J. Harris, economist and father of Kamala Harris, the 49th Vice President of the United States
- John Hearne, novelist, journalist, and teacher
- Claude McKay, poet laureate
- Clinton Morrison, footballer for the Republic of Ireland national team
- William O'Brien, 2nd Earl of Inchiquin, military officer and colonial administrator
- Kalvin Phillips, footballer for the English national team
- Dillian Whyte, heavyweight boxer
- Evelyn O'Callaghan

== See also ==
- Irish immigration to Saint Kitts and Nevis
- Irish immigration to Barbados
- Redlegs
- List of expatriate Irish populations
