= Redleg =

Term for White Caribbeans

Redleg is a term used to refer to poor whites who live or at one time lived on Barbados, St. Vincent, Grenada and a few other Caribbean islands. Their forebears were sent from Ireland, Britain and Continental Europe as indentured servants, forced labourers, or peons.

== Etymology ==
According to folk etymology, the name is derived from the effects of the tropical sun on the fair-skinned legs of white emigrants, now known as sunburn. However, the term "Redlegs" and its variants were also in use for Irish soldiers who were taken as prisoners of war in the Irish Confederate Wars and transported to Barbados as indentured servants.

In addition to "Redlegs", the term underwent extensive progression in Barbados and the following terms were also used: "Redshanks", "Poor whites", "Poor Backra", "Backra Johnny", "Ecky-Becky", "Johnnies" or "Poor Backward Johnnies", "Poor whites from below the hill", "Edey white mice" or "Beck-e Neck" (Baked-neck). Historically, anything besides "poor whites" were used as derogatory insults.

== History ==
Many of the Redlegs' ancestors were transported by Oliver Cromwell after his conquest of Ireland. Some were sent from England by the Bloody Assizes following Monmouth's rebellion against James II. Others had originally arrived on Barbados in the early to mid-17th century as indentured servants, to work on the sugar plantations. Small groups of Germans and Portuguese prisoners of war were also imported as plantation labourers.

By the 18th century, indentured servants became less common. African slaves were trained in all necessary trades, so there was no demand for paid white labour. The Redlegs, in turn, were unwilling to work alongside the freed black population on the plantations.

Because of the deplorable conditions under which the Redlegs lived, a campaign was initiated in the mid-19th century to move portions of the population to other islands which would be more economically hospitable. The relocation process succeeded, and a distinct community of Redleg descendants live in the Dorsetshire Hill District on St. Vincent as well as on the islands of Grenada around Mt. Moritz and Bequia.

The term "Redleg" is also used in South Carolina, where Barbadians had settled.

== See also ==
- Béké
- Buckra
- Conch (people)
- Zoreilles
- White Caribbean people
- History of South Carolina
- Irish immigration to Saint Kitts and Nevis
- Irish immigration to Barbados
- Irish people in Jamaica
- Irish indentured servitude
- Red Strangers - a novelized account of the arrival and effects of European settlers to colonial Kenya
