= Irish immigration to Barbados =

The transport of Irish people to Barbados dates back to the 1620s. The majority were indentured servants, though with an unknown number of political and convict transportees during the 1650s.

== History ==
Indentured servitude appeared in Virginia by 1620. Initially a device used to transport European workers to the New World, over time servitude dwindled as black slavery grew in importance in the British colonies.

Although most Irish immigrants were free or indentured and not slaves, it has been popularly claimed that Cromwell's sale of thousands of military prisoners in the 1650s could be seen as closer to slavery than voluntary indentured immigration. However, this conflation of Irish indentured servants with African chattel slaves, known as the Irish slaves myth, is incorrect and ahistorical. Chattel slavery was a different legal category based on race as codified in The Barbados Slave Code, did not cease after a period of time (usually 7 years for indentured servitude), and stripped those who fell under it entirely of their rights.

== Demography ==
Currently, Barbadian descendants of the Irish are called redlegs. This community has been endogamous, and now numbers only about four hundred people. Most live in poverty and are prey to infections and diseases. Often, they have a poor diet and lack of dental care. Furthermore, hemophilia caused diseases and premature deaths in the community, and excess sugar foods consumed by the community has aroused a high rate of diabetes, which has extended blindness among many of them. Moreover, school absenteeism, poor health, the mixture between members of the same family (which causes severe disease in their descendants) and the poverty of the community, reinforced by the possession of small land, shortage of employment opportunities and maintenance of large families (and therefore greater food shortages for each of its members), have adversely affected their presence on the island. Today, redlegs are characterized by anomalies and difficulties to survive on the island.

== Notable Irish Barbadians ==
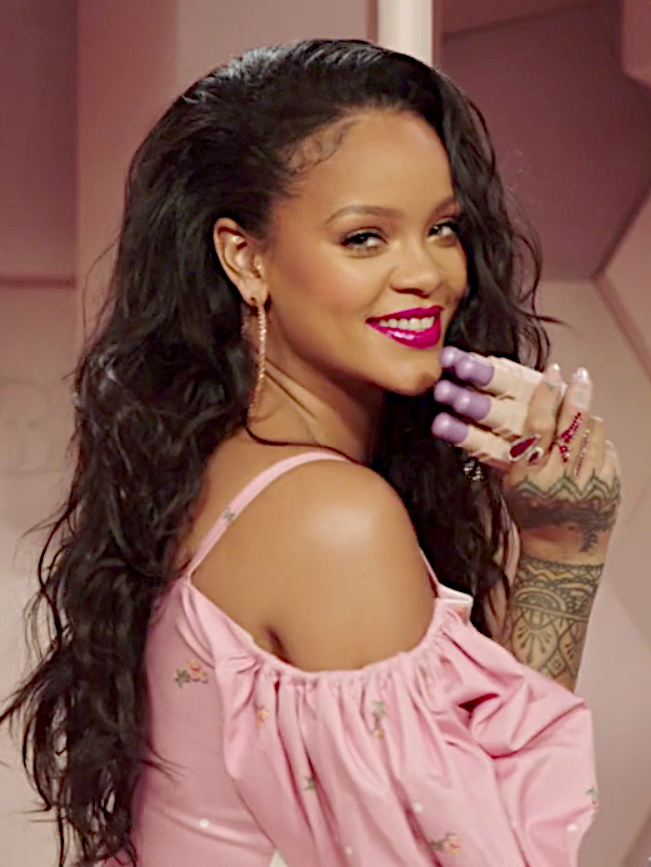
Rihanna

- Rihanna

== See also ==
- White Barbadians
- Barbadians
- History of South Carolina
- Irish immigration to Saint Kitts and Nevis
- Irish people in Jamaica
- Irish diaspora
- Irish indentured servants
- Irish slaves myth
- Redlegs
