= Irish indentured servants =

Irish people in indentured servitude in British Empire overseas territories

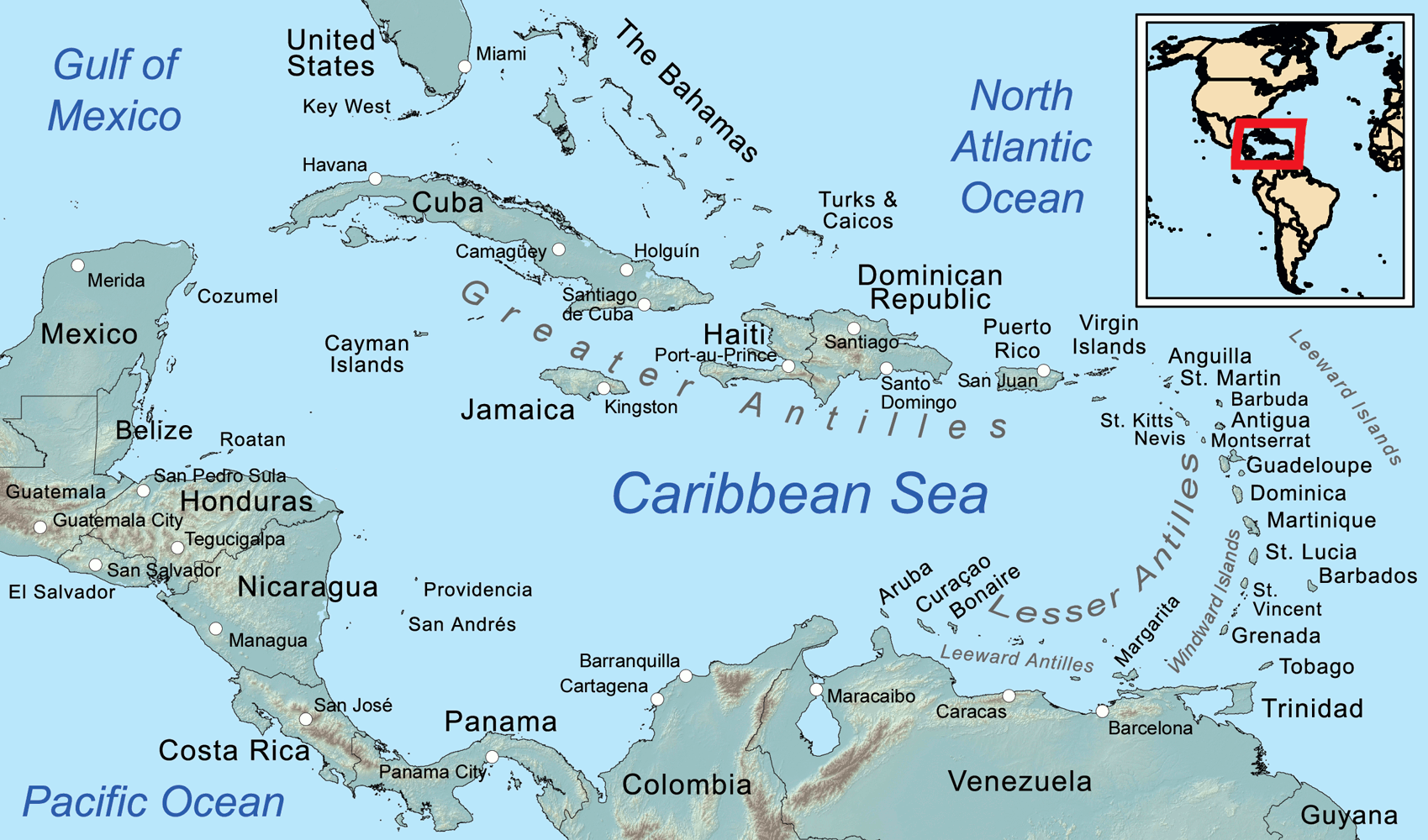
Modern map of the Caribbean. The Irish went to Barbados, Jamaica and the Leeward Islands.

Irish indentured servants were Irish people who became indentured servants in territories under the control of the British Empire, such as the British West Indies (particularly Barbados, Jamaica, Bermuda, Montserrat, Saint Kitts and Nevis and other Leeward Islands), Newfoundland, British North America and later Australia.

Indentures agreed to provide up to seven years of labor in return for passage to the New World and food, housing, and shelter during their indenture. At the end of this period, their masters were legally required to grant them "freedom dues" in the form of either land or capital. An indentured servant's contract could be extended as punishment for breaking a law, such as running away, or in the case of female servants, becoming pregnant.

Those transported unwillingly were not indentures. They were political prisoners, vagrants, or people who had been defined as "undesirable" by the English state. Penal transportation of Irish people was at its height during the 17th century, during the Cromwellian conquest and settlement of Ireland (1649–1653). During this period, thousands of Irish people were sent to the Caribbean, or "Barbadosed", against their will. Similar practices continued as late as the Victorian period, with Irish political prisoners sent to imperial British penal colonies in Australia. Indentures and transportees have been conflated, though they were different.

== Historical background ==
Like the movement of other European people to the Americas, Irish migration to the Caribbean and British North America had complex causes. The late sixteenth and early seventeenth century were a time of upheaval in Ireland, while English conquest and colonisation, resultant religious persecution, and crop failures (some as a deliberate result of the Tudor conquest of Ireland) drove many Irish people to seek a better life, or survival, elsewhere. Like their English and Scottish counterparts, Irish people were active participants in the "rush for American colonies" during the early seventeenth century. Most travelled to the New World as indentured servants, but others were merchants and landholders who were key players in a variety of different trade and settlement enterprises.

Many of the Irish laborers who travelled across the Atlantic from the 1620s did so by choice. However, convict labor had been used in English colonies since the early 1600s, and the forceful transportation of "undesirables" from Ireland to the West Indies had begun under Charles I. The practice took place on a much larger scale during the rule of Oliver Cromwell in the years 1649–58. In the ensuing conquest of Ireland, many prisoners were forcibly sent to the Caribbean islands, particularly to Barbados.

Some of the first Irish people to travel to the New World did so as members of the Spanish garrison in Florida during the 1560s, and small numbers of Irish colonists were involved in efforts to establish colonies in the Amazon region, in Newfoundland, and in Virginia between 1604 and the 1630s. According to historian Donald Akenson, there were "few if any" Irish being forcibly transported to the New World during this period. Widespread use of forced transportation by the English state did not take place until the 1650s.

Significant numbers of Irish laborers began traveling to colonies such as Virginia, the Leeward Islands, and Barbados in the 1620s. Between 1627 and 1660, laborers from Ireland and Britain crossed the Atlantic in large numbers, with as many as 60 to 65 percent of seventeenth-century migrants being indentured servants. By 1640, large numbers of Irish settlers were present in the West Indies, making up more than half the population of the region by some estimates. Most were indentured laborers, small farmers, or artisans.

The type of labor being used in American colonies shifted dramatically after 1642, as the Irish Rebellion of 1641, the Irish Confederate Wars, and the Wars of the Three Kingdoms led to a reduction in the number of voluntary migrants, while growing numbers of prisoners of war, political prisoners, felons, and other "undesirables" were sent to labor in the colonies against their will. After the Siege of Drogheda, for example, Cromwell ordered most of the Irish military prisoners who surrendered to be shipped to Barbados. In 1654, the governors of several Irish counties were ordered to arrest "all wanderers, men and women, and such other Irish within their precincts as should not prove they had such a settled course of industry as yielded them a means of their own to maintain them, all such children as were in hospitals or workhouses, all prisoners, men and women, to be transported to the West Indies."

== Barbados ==
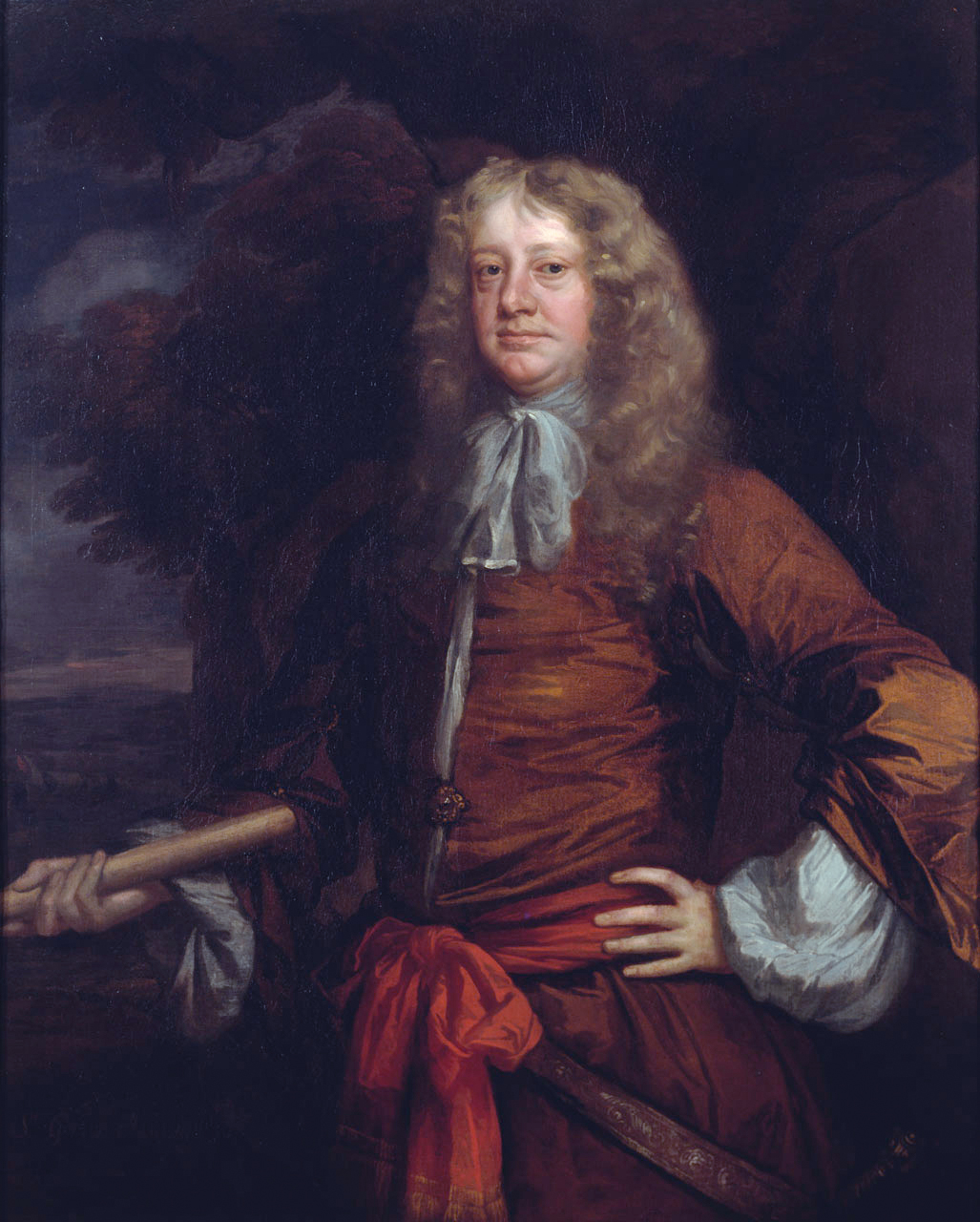
George Ayscue, an English Governor of Barbados. He conquered Barbados for the Cromwellian forces in 1651.

Servants who arrived in Barbados between 1640 and 1660 arrived at a time of great change, when the colony was transitioning from tobacco and cotton cultivation to sugar. The resulting "sugar boom" created a massive demand for labor, which prompted a gradual shift from white servant to black slave labor. In 1638, the population of Barbados was about 6,000, with 2,000 of that number being indentured servants and 200 being African slaves. Fifteen years later, the Islands slave population had grown to 20,000, while indentured servants numbered 8,000. There were also more than 1,000 Irish freemen (former indentured servants whose term had expired) living on the island at that time. By 1660, there were 26,200 Europeans and 27,100 African slaves on the Island. During the initial stages of sugar production, white servants sometimes found themselves working side by side with black slaves, and according to historian James Dunn, they "became wild and unruly in the extreme" during this period. By the mid-1650s, however, white servants and black slaves no longer worked side by side, and by the mid-1660s, white servants were used only in skilled or supervisory roles.

Irish servants on Barbados were often treated poorly, and Barbadian planters gained a reputation for cruelty. The decreased appeal of an indenture on Barbados, combined with enormous demand for labor caused by sugar cultivation, led the use of involuntary transportation to Barbados as a punishment for crimes, or for political prisoners, and also to the kidnapping of laborers who were sent to Barbados involuntarily.

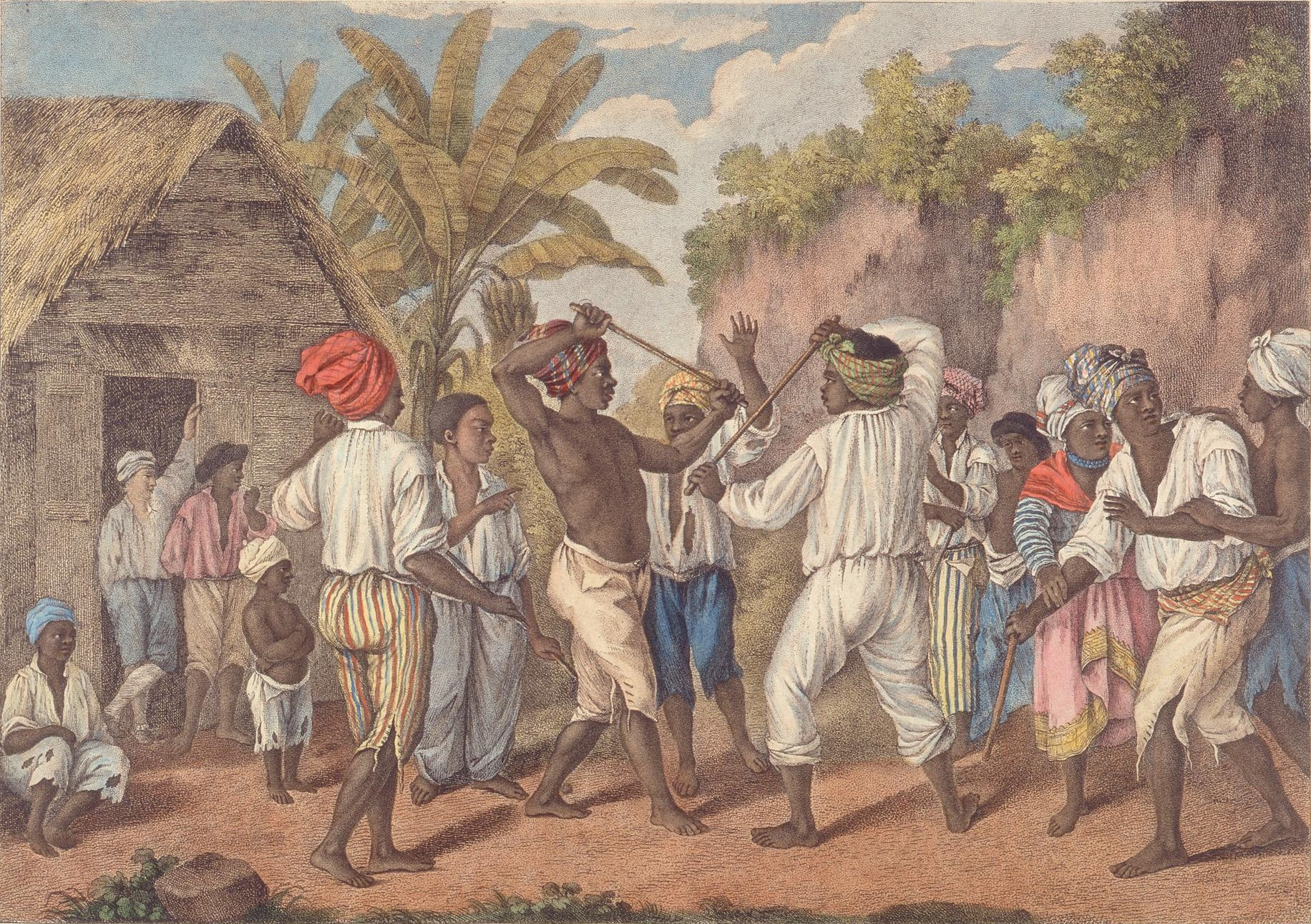
Slaves having a stick fight. A white indentured servant is standing on the left.

Irish indentured servants were a significant portion of the population throughout the period when white servants were used for plantation labor in Barbados, and while a "steady stream" of Irish servants entered the Barbados throughout the seventeenth century, Cromwellian efforts to pacify Ireland created a "veritable tidal wave" of Irish laborers who were sent to Barbados during the 1650s. Due to inadequate historical records, the total number of Irish laborers sent to Barbados is unknown, and estimates have been "highly contentious." While one historical source estimated that as many as 50,000 Irish people were transported to either Barbados or Virginia unwillingly during the 1650s, this estimate is "quite likely exaggerated." Another estimate that 12,000 Irish prisoners had arrived in Barbados by 1655 has been described as "probably exaggerated" by historian Richard B. Sheridan. According to historian Thomas Bartlett, it is "generally accepted" that approximately 10,000 Irish were sent to the West Indies involuntarily, and approximately 40,000 came as voluntary indentured servants, while many also traveled as voluntary, un-indentured emigrants.

== Leeward Islands ==
Irish people also made up a sizable portion of the Leeward Islands (Antigua, Montserrat, Nevis, and St Kitts) during the seventeenth and eighteenth centuries. Many of these Irish were either indentured servants or former servants, and many of them lived "materially impoverished" lives; however, the Leeward Islands were also home to more affluent Irish, who were members of powerful merchant families and had numerous servants themselves.

Montserrat became the principal island amongst the Leeward Islands where Irish people coming from the adjacent islands found refuge against British persecution. Divided between the Catholic French and the Protestant English, the Irish people sought refuge in Montserrat where they established their first Catholic church. In 1632, Anthony Brisket became the first Governor of Montserrat. With ties originating from Ireland, Brisket was able to navigate the Island and its people. He would remain in this position until his death.

Unlike Barbados, the Irish population of Montserrat was primarily made up of individuals who had been "recruited to emigrate" by the islands' elite residents (who were often Irish themselves), rather than vagrants or convicts, and some of them had arrived as free laborers rather than as indentured servants.

== Treatment ==
Once indentured, these servants had little control over their destination, as their contracts were sold to local planters on arrival. Ships were often overcrowded, and the mortality rate on voyages could be high: one ship which arrived at Barbados in 1638 had lost eighty of its 350 passengers (23%) to sickness by the time it arrived.

In Barbados, indenture terms of four or five years were common, but those who arrived as prisoners were sometimes sentenced to ten years' indenture.

While all indentured servants were treated harshly, Irish Catholics were also subject to English settlers' "sense of cultural and religious superiority" and considered to be "naturally inferior." According to historian Jenny Shaw, the Irish people's Catholicism and distinct customs "marked the island's population as fundamentally apart from English civilization". English authorities used this perceived difference "to justify the poor treatment of the Irish Catholics they colonized," as well as to lay claim to Ireland itself. Masters and government authorities were often suspicious of Irish servants, and sometimes targeted them with special restrictions. Legislators in Nevis, for example, passed an act to prevent "papists" from settling on the island or holding public office in 1701 – which was later repealed – while Montserrat also considered similar legislation to exclude Irish from public and militia positions. Authorities in Barbados did not place similar restrictions, but did require Irish people to take an oath of abjuration before voting or holding office. After suspecting that Irish laborers had been involved in a 1692 slave revolt, Barbadian authorities wrote to the crown in 1697, asking them not to send further "Irish rebels" to the colony, "for we want not labourers of that colour to work for us, but men in whom we may confide, to strengthen us."

== Comparisons to slavery ==
Treatment of Irish indentured servants varied widely, and has been the subject of considerable historical debate. Comparisons between the treatment of Irish indentured servants (particularly in Barbados) and the treatment of African slaves have been especially controversial. While most recent academic studies have been careful not to equate indentured servitude with chattel slavery, some historians have nonetheless drawn close comparisons between these two labor systems, and other writers have sometimes conflated them.

According to Kathryn Stelmach Artuso, historians such as Hilary Beckles (whose work Artuso calls "seminal in the field") have drawn "surprisingly close parallels between the experiences of Africans and Irish in the Caribbean." Beckles has referred to some Irish indentured servants as "temporary chattels" who were kept in "slavelike conditions" and lived in a state "nearer to slavery than freedom," but Artuso notes that Beckles does not draw a one-to-one correspondence, and he stops short of suggesting that Irish servants were "'slaves' in the sense that blacks were". Similarly, historian Nini Rodgers has written that Irish indentured servants "were not slaves", but nonetheless argues that the "difference must have seemed academic" to many of them. According to Rodgers, this was particularly true in places such as Barbados, where high death rates sometimes "cancelled out" the primary difference between slaves and servants' experiences: that slavery was permanent while indenture was temporary. Rodgers notes, however, that there were other differences between the experiences of servants and those of slaves: masters provided servants with meat but denied it to slaves, servants received European-style clothes (including shoes) while slaves did not, and the two groups slept in different quarters. According to Rodgers, masters sometimes worked servants harder because they only possessed their service for a limited time, and this fact underscores "the complexity of making comparisons" between slavery and indenture.

According to Kevin Brady, Cromwellian exiles in Barbados held a position that was "between temporary bondage and permanent enslavement", stating that the main difference between the servants and slaves was that they were not sold as chattel. Brady states that they were often subject to "glaringly inhumane treatment by aristocrats of the planter class" and that they "were not given the material or monetary compensation" usually provided to indentured servants at the end of their term. According to Simon P. Newman, Irish prisoners "were treated with singular brutality" by planters who "disdained them as illiterate Catholic savages."

Other historians have focused on how Irish people were both colonized and colonizers in the Caribbean. According to historian Donald Akenson's study of Irish people on Montserrat, for example, white indentured servitude on the island "was so very different from black slavery as to be from another galaxy of human experience", and many Irish people (including former servants) prospered there. Similarly, philosopher Michael J. Monahan has argued that Irish servants in Barbados occupied an ambiguous racial position in the eighteenth century, which separated them both from other Europeans and from African slaves, and could work to their advantage as well as to their detriment. According to Monahan, even the highest "and most likely exaggerated" estimates that as many as fifty thousand Irish laborers were sent to the Caribbean against their will "pales by comparison" to the millions of West African slaves who were sold into slavery, and it is important to avoid what he calls "facile equivocations between the conditions of (at least some) Irish laborers and chattel slaves" or between slavery and involuntary indenture, which "are not the same thing".

Some popular and non-academic writers have made much more direct comparisons between the experiences of Irish indentured servants and those of African slaves. These books have been harshly reviewed by historians. Writing in The Historian, for example, historian Dixie Ray Haggard wrote that Jordan and Walsh had deliberately conflated two very different labor systems by comparing slavery and indenture. According to Haggard, "they fail to acknowledge, or maybe understand, that each institution, slavery and indentured servitude, had its own purpose and position within the colonial economy and society," and chose to "oversimplify and confuse" rather than explore the complexity of colonial history. Similarly, historian Dominic Sandbrook wrote that while Jordan and Walsh were "right to remind us that African slavery was one form of bondage among many," the indentured servants "were not slaves," and "calling them slaves...stretches the meaning of slavery beyond breaking point". According to Nini Rodgers, these works developed out of the "horror of white people being on a level with blacks" which accounts of servants and slaves laboring together had prompted in Ireland during the seventeenth and eighteenth centuries, and which survived into the new millennium through works such as O'Callaghan's.

Since the books were published, white supremacist and white nationalist groups have adopted the notion of Irish slavery, often as a means of countering the historical burden of African slavery and black Americans' demands for redress, or of undermining and attacking the Black Lives Matter movement.

This prompted scholars and writers such as Liam Hogan, Laura McAtackney and Matthew C. Reilly to speak out against the "myth of Irish slavery".

== Decline of indenture ==
The number of prisoners who were forcibly transported to the New World dropped rapidly after 1660, and "convict transportation never became a reliable source of coerced colonial labor" during the seventeenth century. Penal servitude was considered unsatisfactory by plantation owners: the number of prisoners arriving was too small, and they were considered poor workers. In addition, colonial authorities worried that Irish Catholics would side with French troops in the event of an attack, or conspire with slaves to revolt against plantation owners. Some Irish servants did indeed rebel during a French attack on Saint Kitts during 1666–1667, while others made common cause with slaves during a revolt in Bermuda during 1661. According to historian Abigail Swingen, only about 4,500 convicts were transported to Virginia or the West Indies between 1655 and 1699, while the number of prisoners of war transported during this period was likely less than 5,000–10,000. According to historian Robin Blackburn, a total of about 8,000 Irish captives were sent to the American colonies during the 1650s.

While Irish servants were a substantial portion of the population of Barbados, Jamaica, Montserrat, Antigua, Bermuda and Saint Kitts from the seventeenth until the middle of the eighteenth century, then, former indentured servants typically either returned to Europe or migrated to British North American colonies as slave labor increasingly replaced indentured servitude as the primary labor system in these colonies. Some, however, stayed, and their descendants – such as the Redlegs of Barbados – still live in the Caribbean today.

== See also ==
- Barbados Servant Code
- Convicts in Australia
- Indentured servitude in the Americas
- Irish Caribbean
  - Redlegs
- Irish military diaspora
- Slavery in Ireland
