= Enno Stephan =

German journalist and historian

- Born: 1927; Potsdam, Germany
- Died: 2018 (aged 90–91); Obenstrohe, Germany
- Occupations: Journalist, historian
- Writing career
- Genre: History
- Subject: German-Irish relations
- Notable works: Geheimauftrag Irland (1961); Die Treue und die Redlichkeit (1968)

Enno Stephan (1927–2018) was a German journalist and historian. He was conscripted into the German military at the age of 15 during the Second World War and subsequently became a prisoner of war. He was sent to work at the Abbey of Fontenay in France before starting a career in print and later radio journalism.

He began to write history with a specialism in the Germans in Ireland and the Irish in Germany, and in Geheimauftrag Irland: Deutsche Agenten im Irischen Untergrundkampf 1939-1945 (1961) was the first to write a survey of the activity of Nazi spies in the Republic of Ireland before and during the Second World War. The book was controversial in Ireland as the facts of Germany espionage there during the war were not well known, and it caused embarrassment to individuals mentioned in it and to the Irish government which was lobbying to join the European Economic Community and wanted good relations with Germany.

== Early life ==
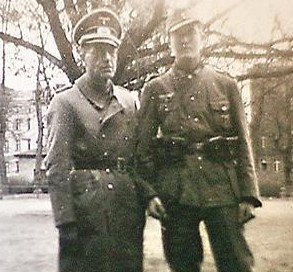
Enno Stephan at age 15 with his father

Enno Stephan was born in 1927 and grew up in Potsdam. He was conscripted for military service at the age of 15 in February 1943 and served on an anti-aircraft battery in Brandenburg. He later served attempting to counter the American advance into Germany, hiding in barns or ruined houses when necessary, and once carrying a machine gun on his back for three days to Bitterfeld before eventually being captured and becoming a prisoner of war.

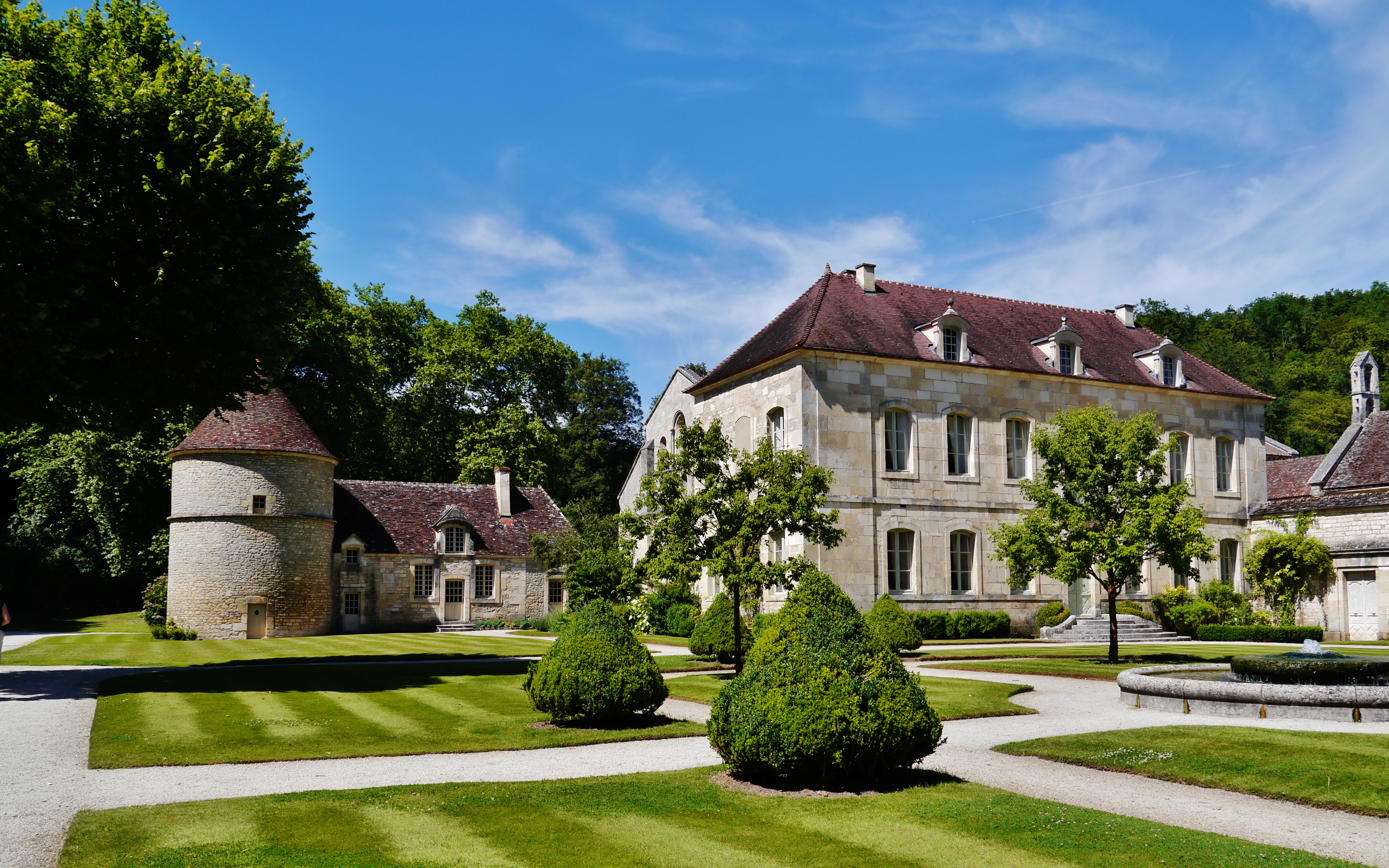
Abbey of Fontenay

Injured, he spent several weeks in a prisoner of war camp before being sent as a civilian worker to a farm at the Abbey of Fontenay in France for three years. On leave in February 1948, he was at his grandmother's home when she was interviewed by a war reporter who was a friend of his father. After reading the resulting article, which appeared while he was still in Germany, he realised that he could do that sort of work. Back in France, he prepared some sample articles that his father sent to various publications resulting in two sheets being printed.

== Career ==
Stephan volunteered for the Bremer Nachrichten newspaper and in 1953 worked freelance in Dublin, Ireland. From 1954 to 1962 he was a culture editor for the Deutsche Presse-Agentur (DPA) news agency. From 1962 until his retirement in 1992, he worked for the German radio broadcaster Deutschlandfunk, specialising in French-language programmes.

== Geheimauftrag Irland ==
It was while he was at DPA that Stephan came across a book titled The Jackboot in Ireland by Sean O'Callaghan (1958) that dealt with the career of Hermann Görtz, a German spy in Britain and Ireland during the Second World War. He found the book to be full of errors and resolved to write a more accurate account despite most of the official records of the period being closed, meaning that he relied heavily on personal interviews with witnesses.

The resulting book, Geheimauftrag Irland: Deutsche Agenten im Irischen Untergrundkampf 1939-1945, was published in 1961 and was the first survey of the activity of Nazi spies in the Republic of Ireland before and during the Second World War. In the words of John P. Duggan, Stephan did "the spade work in taking the lid off the spies story". It received wide publicity as journalists translated sections into English and Stephan wrote supporting articles in Irish newspapers. An English language translation was published as Spies in Ireland in 1963 and serialised in the Irish Sunday Independent newspaper the same year. In 1965, The Military Engineer described the book as puncturing the popular myths that the neutral Irish government actually favoured the Germans, and of the efficiency of German espionage activity.

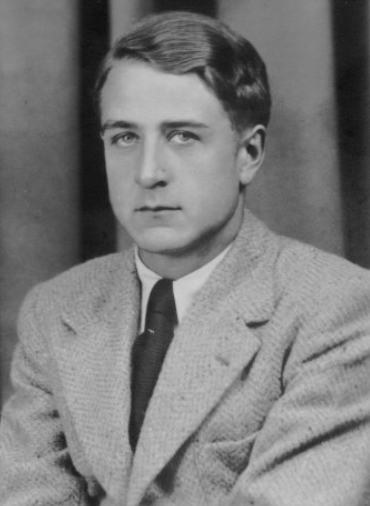
Helmut Clissmann, naturalised Irishman, who was revealed as a former Abwehr agent by Stephan.

The book proved controversial in Ireland as the facts of German espionage activity in the country were not widely known. It caused embarrassment to the Irish government during a period when German-Irish relations were already under strain due to arguments over German land purchases in Ireland and when the Irish government was lobbying to join the European Economic Community. The detailed information about individuals caused embarrassment to the German embassy in Ireland, some of whose staff were in post during the war and suspected of spying, while Helmut Clissman, one of the sources for the book and by the 1960s an Irish citizen and established businessman in the country, was revealed to have been an Abwehr officer during the war whom the Nazis twice tried to smuggle into Ireland to work with the Irish Republican Army against the British. The Irish President, Éamon de Valera, rejected the book outright and denied words attributed to him in it.

It was translated into French in 1964 as Espions allemands en Irlande (1939-1945), and into Italian in 2001 as Spie in Irlanda. Agenti tedeschi e IRA durante la seconda guerra mondiale. In 2002, Stephan provided the foreword to Mark M. Hull's Irish Secrets: German Espionage in Wartime Ireland, 1939-1945.

== Other writing ==
Due to the success of Geheimauftrag Irland, Stephan produced the autobiographical Burgundische Jahre; der Gefangene von Fontenay in 1962 which dealt with his time working at the Abbey of Fontenay, and in 1966 Das Revier der Pioniere. Werden und Wachsen des Ruhrgebiets. In 1968, and living in West Germany, he published Die Treue und die Redlichkeit Wiederbegegnung mit Potsdam (Truth and Honesty: Reunion with Potsdam) in which, after months of letter writing to obtain permission, he revisited Potsdam, then in East Germany, for the first time in over twenty years. In the book he contrasted the city as he remembered it with the 1960s reality.

== Later life ==
Stephan died in 2018 at the age of 91 in Obenstrohe, a district of Varel in Lower Saxony.

== Selected publications ==
- Geheimauftrag Irland: Deutsche Agenten im Irischen Untergrundkampf 1939-1945. Gerhard Stalling, Oldenburg, Hamburg, 1961.
- Burgundische Jahre; der Gefangene von Fontenay. Gerhard Stalling, Oldenburg, Hamburg, 1962.
- Spies in Ireland. Translated by Arthur Davidson. Macdonald, London, 1963.
- Espions allemands en Irlande (1939-1945). Ed. de Trévise, Paris, 1964.
- Das Revier der Pioniere. Werden und Wachsen des Ruhrgebiets. Mosaik Verlag, Hamburg, 1966.
- Die Treue und die Redlichkeit Wiederbegegnung mit Potsdam. Hörnemann, Bonn, 1968.
- William Thomas Mulvany (1806-1885); Ein irischer Pionier des Ruhrgebiets. Tübingen Dt.-Irischer Freundeskreis in Baden-Württemberg, 1985.
- "Keltologie unter dem Hakenkreuz: Drei deutsch-irische Episoden" in Sabine Heinz (Ed.) Die Deutsche Keltologie und ihre Berliner Gelehrten bis 1945. Peter Lang, Berlin, 1999. ISBN 9783631334393
- Spie in Irlanda. Agenti tedeschi e IRA durante la seconda guerra mondiale. Translated by Eddo Cimatti. Greco & Greco, Milan, 2001. ISBN 9788879802796
