= Irish slaves =

Irish slaves may refer to:

- Slavery in Ireland, the institution of slavery as it existed in Ireland
- Irish indentured servants, Irish people who were transported to the Americas as indentured servants
- Irish slaves myth, a pseudohistorical narrative regarding the comparison of Irish indentured servants to chattel slavery in the Americas
