= Marmagne, Côte-d'Or =

Marmagne
- Commune
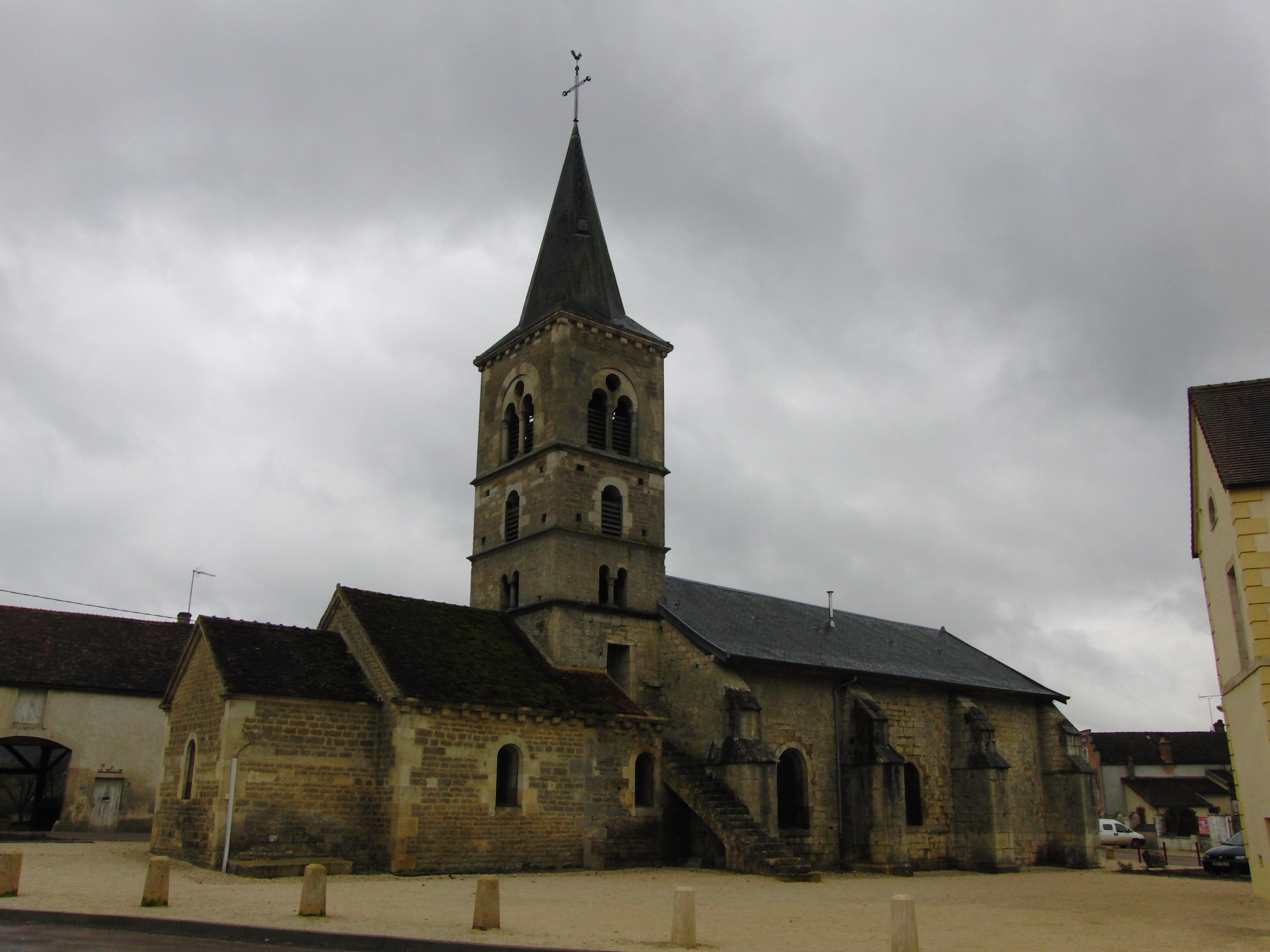
- The church in Marmagne
- Location of Marmagne
- Location within France Location within Bourgogne-Franche-Comté
- Coordinates: 47°37′22″N 4°22′06″E
- Country: France
- Region: Bourgogne-Franche-Comté
- Department: Côte-d'Or
- Arrondissement: Montbard
- Canton: Montbard

Government
  - Mayor (2020–2026): Marcel Drappier
- Area^{1}: 12.89 km^{2} (4.98 sq mi)
- Elevation: 218 m (715 ft)
- Highest elevation: 359 m (1,178 ft)
- Lowest elevation: 211 m (692 ft)
- Population (2023): 195
  - Density: 15.1/km^{2} (39.2/sq mi)
- Time zone: UTC+01:00 (CET)
  - Summer (DST): UTC+02:00 (CEST)
- INSEE/Postal code: 21389 /21500
- ^{1} French Land Register data, which excludes lakes, ponds, glaciers > 1 km^{2} (0.386 sq mi or 247 acres) and river estuaries.

Marmagne (French pronunciation: [maʁmaɲ]) is a commune in the Côte-d'Or department in eastern France.

The Abbey of Fontenay is located on the territory of the commune.

== Population ==
Historical population
Year	Pop.	±% p.a.
1968	221	—
1975	212	−0.59%
1982	213	+0.07%
1990	281	+3.52%
1999	299	+0.69%
2007	245	−2.46%
2012	237	−0.66%
2017	212	−2.20%
2023	195	−1.38%
Source: INSEE

== See also ==
- Communes of the Côte-d'Or department
