= Racism in Ireland =

Racism in Ireland encompasses a range of discriminatory attitudes including racial discrimination, religious discrimination and discrimination based on skin color, both historically and in the present day. While Ireland was itself a colonized nation under British rule, it has also experienced the challenges of becoming a modern, multicultural society, particularly since the 1990s. These challenges include racism directed at asylum seekers, refugees, the Roma community, and people of African, Middle Eastern, and Asian descent, often compounded by issues of xenophobia, Islamophobia, online misinformation and anti-immigrant sentiment.

Ireland's experience of racism is shaped by its complex postcolonial identity, cultural homogeneity throughout much of the 20th century, and more recent exposure to far-right ideologies. Although not historically a colonizing power, Ireland has nonetheless seen the emergence of racial prejudice both within its borders and among its diaspora abroad. Despite this, Ireland also has a growing tradition of anti-racist activism, inclusive political representation, and social movements that advocate for immigrant rights and multicultural integration.

== History ==
Ireland has a long and complex relationship with racial and ethnic discrimination, including its treatment of non-white residents and immigrants.

According to historian Bryan Fanning, the roots of racism in the Republic of Ireland date back to the first half of the 20th century, during which minority groups such as Jews and Irish Travellers were "othered" in a racialised manner as part of the process of state nationalism in Ireland. Fanning also argued that the Irish state's response to Jewish refugees fleeing the Holocaust during the 1930s and 1940s were also motivated by racism. As noted by sociologist Ronit Lentin:

To date, theorizing Irishness as white privilege has been hampered by legacies of racialisation of Irishness as structured by anti-Irish racism in Ireland and abroad. However, Ireland's new position topping the Globalisation Index, its status symbol as the locus of 'cool' culture, and its privileged position within an ever-expanding European Community calls for the understanding of Irishness as white supremacy.

=== 20th century ===
Although Ireland was historically a colonized nation, elements within the political and clerical establishment supported imperialist ideologies, including white supremacy. This was evident in the rhetoric of the era - “the white man’s burden”, and in the participation of Irish elites in British colonial administration. Notably, Michael O'Dwyer, the appointed Governor General of the Punjab from Tipperary, who ordered the 1919 Amritsar Massacre in India. These historical contradictions underscore how Ireland's own experience of colonization did not preclude complicity in imperial and racial hierarchies.

During World War II, although Ireland was officially neutral, Taoiseach Éamon de Valera was accused of sympathizing with and supporting the Nazi regime of Adolf Hitler in Germany. Following the death of Hitler in 1945, de Valera offered sympathies to the German ambassador at the Embassy in Dublin. This led to the belief among Allied leaders such as Churchill that de Valera and the Irish in general were supportive of the Nazi regime. The substantial influx of Nazi war criminals to Ireland following the war and their acceptance into society both officially by the Government of Ireland and by the general public also lead to claims Ireland was tolerant if not supportive of the Nazi regime.

In mid-twentieth century Ireland there was traditionally very little immigration in general to the Republic of Ireland, and hence little racial diversity, though in recent decades growing prosperity in the country (see: Celtic Tiger) attracted increasing numbers of immigrants, mainly from Central and Eastern Europe (primarily Poland), China and Sub-Saharan Africa. Also, the absence of colonialist baggage has meant that foreign people are not drawn to Ireland by "mother country" factors that have affected other European countries. Descendants of Irish people who emigrated in the past also started moving to the country. Most immigrants have settled in Dublin and the other cities. Though these developments have been somewhat tolerated by most, there has been a steady rise in racist attitudes among some sections of society. A 2001 survey found that 51% of Irish people surveyed considered the country inherently racist and 60% of those in the 25 to 34 age group considered "racism" to be an Irish trait. In 2005, Minister of State for Overseas Development, Conor Lenihan famously advised Socialist politician Joe Higgins to "stick with the kebabs" – referring to his campaigning on behalf of Turkish contract workers who had been paid less than the statutory minimum wage. The Minister later retracted his remarks and apologized. A 2008 EU-MIDIS survey of attitudes to minorities in the 27 EU States found that Ireland had the most racist attitudes to Afro-Europeans in the entire EU.

=== 21st century ===
While most racist abuse in Ireland is verbal or confined to social media, violent hate crimes have occurred. In 2000, a white man was stabbed and seriously injured when defending his Jamaican-born wife from racist abuse by a group of adult men. In 2002, a Chinese man Zhao Liu Tao (29) was murdered in Dublin in what was described as the Republic of Ireland's first racially motivated murder. Later that year Leong Ly Min, a Vietnamese man who had lived in Dublin since 1979, was mortally wounded by two assailants who had been racially abusing him. In February 2008, two Polish mechanics, Paweł Kalita (29) and Mariusz Szwajkos (27) were attacked by a group of Dublin youths and died outside their home after each being stabbed in the head with a screwdriver. In 2010, 15-year-old schoolboy Toyosi Shittabey, born in Nigeria but brought up in Dublin, was killed. The only man to stand trial for the murder was acquitted on the direction of the trial Judge.

The Shelta or Irish Travellers, a nomadic ethnic group once speaking their own language, have also experienced persecution in past and modern times throughout Ireland.

The Mayor of Naas Darren Scully was forced to resign on 22 November 2011 over comments on live radio about the "aggressive attitude" of "black Africans".

In June 2020, Hazel Chu, a Green Party politician and Irish woman of Chinese heritage, was elected to the office of Lord Mayor of Dublin. In the run-up to the election, she was targeted by National Party leader Justin Barrett and he was captured in a video stating that if his party were to gain power, he would work to strip her of her citizenship, despite the fact she had been born in Ireland and lived there since birth. He stated, "She is an Irish citizen, I accept that, that is the law until we get the law in our own hands". Later, a Twitter account operated by Barrett's wife made disparaging and racist comments towards Chu. Chu, in response, stated that she refused to be intimidated by such tactics.

Between 2020-2021, revelations emerged about racial profiling, segregation, and the unauthorized identity registration of non-white children in Ireland's mother and baby homes. Rosemary Adasar, a mixed-race survivor, highlighted how the Catholic Church and state institutions perpetuated racist ideologies through missionary narratives and dehumanizing imagery.

Racial discrimination in education remains a persistent issue. According to the EU’s Being Black in Europe report, “black children in Ireland faced the highest levels of bullying, racist comments and physical attacks across the member states surveyed,” with 24 % reporting discrimination in schools versus 18 % across the EU, and 39 % of Black African parents reporting “offensive or threatening comments at school”

Studies from the early 2000s postulated a racial hierarchy that may exist in Ireland. The postulated hierarchy placed white, settled Irish at the top, followed by groups such as white European immigrants, established South Asians and Chinese below. The most marginalized groups, recent African immigrants and Irish Traveller, consistently ranked at the bottom of this structure.

== Root causes ==
Globally, racial discrimination stems from a mix of historical, social, economic, and psychological factors. Colonialism and slavery played a foundational role, creating racial hierarchies that persist today in institutions and cultural narratives. Economic competition often fuels resentment toward minority groups, especially during periods of austerity or migration. Additionally, cultural and religious differences are sometimes framed as threats to national identity, reinforcing xenophobia and exclusion. Social conditioning, stereotypes in media, and lack of education on diversity and equity also perpetuate everyday racism, often unconsciously. These global dynamics often mirror each other while taking distinct forms depending on local histories and power structures. The next sections highlight some of these causes that are unique to Ireland

=== Primary and second-level education ===
Books and the Irish school curriculum play a significant role in shaping the understanding of racism in Ireland. Although both the Junior Cycle and Leaving Certificate curricula often include works that offer opportunities to explore multicultural experiences, these are often optional texts. According to the Department of Education, SPHE the framework of the ciriculum “fosters … understanding, empathy, and mutual respect” and encourages pupils to examine how discrimination can occur at different levels

However despite these frameworks, wide gaps remain. Campaigners like Dr Ebun Joseph argue that the Irish education system sometimes fails to meaningfully address racism, noting that “our education system actually teaches us how to be racist” due to the absence of structured teaching on minority histories and inadequate anti-racism training for educators

Youth groups such as YARI (Youth Against Racism & Inequality) have pressed for the inclusion of black, Traveller, and migrant histories in the national curriculum and mandatory racial-awareness training for teachers

Professor Karl Kitching argues that despite strong evidence, institutional racism has never been acklowedged nor meaningfully confronted in the Irish education sector.

A study by University College Dublin found that,

While anti-racism policies and education are undoubtedly required in schools, this will not be successful until racism is acknowledged, and students and teachers are prepared to confront their own biases and roles in reproducing unequal structures

=== Catholic nationalism ===
The Catholic state in Ireland has contributed to racism through its historic role in shaping national identity, educational narratives, and institutional practices. Rooted in a dominant Catholic-nationalist framework, the state often promoted a narrow definition of Irishness—white, Catholic, and ethnically homogeneous, which excluded racial and religious minorities.

The Church also played a role in perpetuating racialized missionary ideologies, reinforcing notions of white superiority and paternalism through campaigns like "pennies for the black babies." These efforts framed Africans as helpless and uncivilized, fostering patronizing and racist attitudes among Irish Catholics. Moreover, the Church's global alignment with colonial missions further entrenched racial hierarchies, despite Ireland's own colonized status. This fusion of religion, nationalism, and moral authority helped normalize exclusionary views that persist today in parts of Irish society.

=== Housing shortage ===
Ireland’s ongoing housing crisis has severely strained public services and affordability, creating widespread anxiety over access to homes — a fear that has been exploited by far-right groups to scapegoat immigrants, particularly asylum seekers. These groups falsely claim that migrants are given preferential access to housing, even though refugees often live in substandard or overcrowded conditions under the Direct Provision system. Legal immigrants, including those who contribute economically and purchase homes, have also become targets of resentment when they move into new developments in areas facing shortages.

=== Irish diaspora and whiteness ===
In places like the United States and United Kingdom, the Irish historically occupied a racially or ethnically ambiguous position, with phrases like "No Irish, No Blacks, No Dogs" capturing their exclusion.

Over time Irish immigrants assimilated into whiteness, especially in America, often at the expense of Black people and other minorities.Some Irish-Americans participated in or benefited from systemic racism — e.g., opposing desegregation, joining white-only unions.

This dynamic, the adoption of white privilege by a formerly marginalized group — is a key theme in understanding Irish complicity in racism abroad and more recently at home in Ireland. There's the national narrative of the Irish as historically oppressed (under British colonialism), which can lead to a sense of moral exceptionalism, creating resistance to acknowledging racism within Ireland or dismissing it as less severe than elsewhere.

== Official interventions ==
The Irish Network Against Racism raises awareness of and records incidents of racism in Ireland. Its report for 2022 documents 600 racist incidents, including graffiti, hate speech and assaults. Governmental efforts to combat racism in Ireland include the National Action Plan Against Racism (NAPAR), launched on 21 March 2023 by the Department of Children, Equality, Disability, Integration and Youth. Legislations exist to provide protections against discrimination, such as the Prohibition of Incitement to Hatred Act 1989, which criminalizes incitement to hatred based on race, religion, nationality, or sexual orientation, alongside the Criminal Justice (Hate Offences) Act 2024 that enhances penalties for hate-motivated offenses.

== See also ==
- Antisemitism in Ireland
- Irish slaves myth
- Slavery in Ireland
