= Irish slaves myth =

False conflation of Irish indentured servitude and African chattel slavery

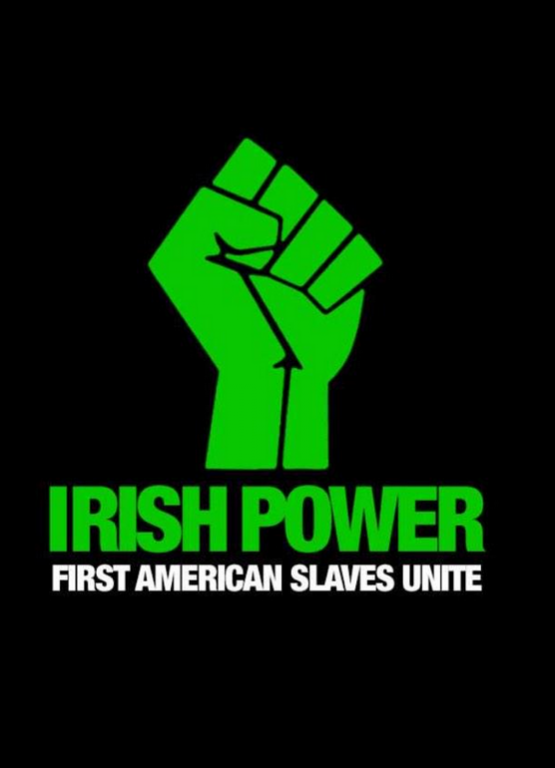
An Internet meme espousing the pseudohistorical narrative

The Irish slaves myth is a fringe pseudohistorical narrative that conflates the penal transportation and indentured servitude of Irish people during the 17th and 18th centuries with the hereditary chattel slavery experienced by the forebears of the African diaspora.

Some white nationalists, and others who want to minimize the effects of hereditary chattel slavery on Africans and their descendants, have used this false equivalence to deny racism against African Americans or claim that African Americans are too vocal in seeking justice for historical grievances. It also can hide the facts around Irish involvement in the transatlantic slave trade.

The myth has been in circulation since at least the 1990s and has been disseminated in online memes and social media debates. According to historians Jerome S. Handler and Matthew C. Reilly, "it is misleading, if not erroneous, to apply the term 'slave' to Irish and other indentured servants in early Barbados". In 2016, academics and Irish historians wrote to condemn the myth.

== Common elements ==
Common elements to memes that propagate the myth are:

- The conspiracy theory that historians and the media are covering up Irish slavery.
- That all Irish people were enslaved after the Cromwellian conquest of Ireland in 1649.
- Irish slaves were treated worse than African slaves.
- Irish women were forced to reproduce with African men.
- Intending to diminish the discrimination that African Americans have historically experienced, with memes like "The Irish were slaves, too. We got over it, so why can't you?".
- Using photographs of victims of the Holocaust or 20th-century child laborers, claiming that they are Irish slaves.
- A reference to an alleged 1625 declaration by King James II to send thousands of Irish prisoners to the West Indies as slaves. James II had not been even born yet; he was born in 1633 and started his rule in 1685. 1625 saw the end of King James I's rule and the ascension of King Charles I to the throne.
- The substitution of the victims of actual atrocities committed against enslaved Africans with Irish victims.

== Background ==
During British rule in Ireland, and particularly during the Plantations of Ireland and the Cromwellian conquest, the terms "slaves" or "bond slaves" were sometimes used to describe the time-bound system of servitude of tens of thousands of Irish. The official legal terminology used was "indentured servants" whether the servants in question had willingly signed the indenture contract to emigrate to the Americas or were forced to go. In any other form, those transported unwillingly were not considered to be indentured. This included political prisoners, vagrants, convicts, prostitutes, or people who had been defined as "undesirable" by the British government.

Penal transportation of Irish people was at its height during the 17th century, most was for various felonies such as highway robbery, vagrancy (homelessness), burglary, and horse theft. Penal transportation was a general practice in Great Britain as well as Ireland. These were the offences most often punished with transportation for men in the 1670s, though for women it was theft. They were then subjected to forced labour for a given period when they arrived in the Americas or Australia. During this same period, the Atlantic slave trade was transporting millions of Africans across the Atlantic and bringing them to various European colonies in America (including British America) where they were purchased by European colonists and put to work.

Treatment of Irish indentured servants varied widely, but the transport, physical work, and living conditions have been compared by scholars to the treatment of enslaved Africans. However, the usual period of indenture for an Irish person was from four years to nine years, after which they were free – able to travel freely, own property, and accumulate wealth. Additionally, the formerly indentured Irish person could now marry whom they chose and their children were born free. Unlike Irish indentured servants, enslaved Africans generally were made slaves for life and this perpetual slave status was imposed on their children at birth.

Both systematically and legally, enslaved Africans were subjected to a lifelong, inheritable condition of slavery that indentured Irish people never were. Donald Harman Akenson makes the point that in this "white indentured servitude was so very different from black slavery as to be from another galaxy of human experience". Additionally, in terms of numbers, the "most likely exaggerated" high estimates of Irish laborers sent to the Caribbean, along with estimates of total numbers of prisoners and indentured servants in British America, "pales by comparison" to the millions of enslaved Africans who were transported to the Americas."

=== Irish involvement in the slave trade ===
According to historian Nini Rodgers, in the 18th century "every group in Ireland (Gaelic, Hiberno-Norman or Anglo-Irish) produced merchants who benefited from the slave trade and the expanding slave colonies." Although the Navigation Acts prevented Ireland from participating directly in the slave trade, some Irish merchants of different religious and social backgrounds generated significant wealth by exporting goods to overseas plantations and importing slave-produced goods into Ireland as part of the triangular trade. Exports of salted and pickled provisions to slave-colonies were central to economic expansion in Georgian era Cork, Limerick, and Belfast, while imports of West Indian sugar contributed to urban growth and the rise of a Catholic middle class. Rodgers concluded that by the end of the 18th century "Ireland was very much part of the Black Atlantic world".

Some Irishmen worked as "agents of empire". Jane Ohlmeyer notes that by 1660, Irishmen, both Protestants and Catholics, "were to be found in the French Caribbean, the Portuguese and later Dutch Amazon, Spanish Mexico, and the English colonies in the Atlantic where they... forged commercial networks as they traded calicos, spices, tobacco, sugar, and slaves." The French port of Nantes, in particular, was dominated by a community of exiled Irish Jacobites, and rose to prominence in the 18th century as France's foremost slave trading port. Irish Catholics made up more than two-thirds of the Anglo-Caribbean island of Montserrat's plantation owners as early as the 17th century, and according to historian Donald Akenson "they knew how to be hard and efficient slave masters." American historian Brian Kelly cautions against indicting "the country as a whole" as "overwhelmingly the benefits of Ireland’s involvement in transatlantic slavery went to the same class that presided over the misery that culminated in the horrors of famine and mass starvation."

== Origins and propagation ==
According to historian Liam Kennedy, the idea of 'Irish slavery' was popular within the nineteenth-century Irish independence movement Young Ireland. Young Irelander John Mitchel was particularly vocal in his claim that the Irish had been enslaved, although he was a supporter of the Atlantic slave trade in Africans.

An Irish Times article notes that Irish republicans "are intent on drawing direct parallels between the experiences of black people under slavery and of Irish people under British rule", which has in turn been repurposed "by white supremacist groups in the US to attack and denigrate the African-American experience of slavery."

According to history professor Ciaran O’Neill of Trinity College Dublin, while those most active in propagating myth – who are often located in Australia and the United States – "want to create false equivalence between the Atlantic slave trade and the phenomenon of indentured Irish labour in the Caribbean" for the purpose of undermining the Black Lives Matter movement, research librarian and independent scholar Liam Hogan "also makes the point that this narrative has been used to help obscure the fact that many Irish people participated in and profited from slavery."

In the Dublin Review of Books, professor Bryan Fanning states: "The popularity of the 'Irish slaves' meme cannot simply be blamed on the online propaganda of white supremacist groups. There are several elements at play beyond the deliberate falsification of the past. Widespread acceptance online of a false equivalence between chattel slavery and the treatment of Irish migrants appears to be rooted in Irish narratives of victimhood that continue to be articulated within Ireland’s cultural and political mainstreams." Irish people's history has embraced both a legacy of identification with the oppressed, and elements of racism in the service of Irish nationalism, according to Fanning.

=== In print ===
A number of books have been written on the subject, including White Cargo: The Forgotten History of Britain's White Slaves in America; and The Irish Slaves: Slavery, Indenture and Contract Labor Among Irish Immigrants. According to Hogan, the most influential book to assert the myth was They Were White and They Were Slaves: The Untold History of the Enslavement of Whites in Early America, self-published in the US in 1993 by conspiracy theorist and Holocaust denier Michael A. Hoffman II (who blamed Jews for the Atlantic slave trade).

To Hell Or Barbados: The Ethnic Cleansing of Ireland (2000), by Irish writer Sean O'Callaghan, is advertised as "a vivid account of the Irish slave trade: the previously untold story of over 50,000 Irish men, women and children who were transported to Barbados and Virginia." The book continued the same themes as Hoffman, and introduced the concept of Irish women being forcibly bred with Africans. Other authors repeated these lurid descriptions of Irish women being compelled to have sex with African men.

The book has been described as shoddily researched. Brian Kelly calls the book "highly problematic" and writes: "The careless blurring of the lines between slavery and indenture in O’Callaghan’s work, rooted in sentimental nationalism than a commitment to white supremacy – provided an aura of credibility for the ‘Irish slaves’ meme that it would not have otherwise enjoyed." According to The New York Times, "In America, [O'Callaghan's] book connected the white slave narrative to an influential ethnic group [Irish-Americans] of over 34 million people, many of whom had been raised on stories of Irish rebellion against Britain and tales of anti-Irish bias in America at the turn of the 20th century. From there, it took off."

=== Online ===
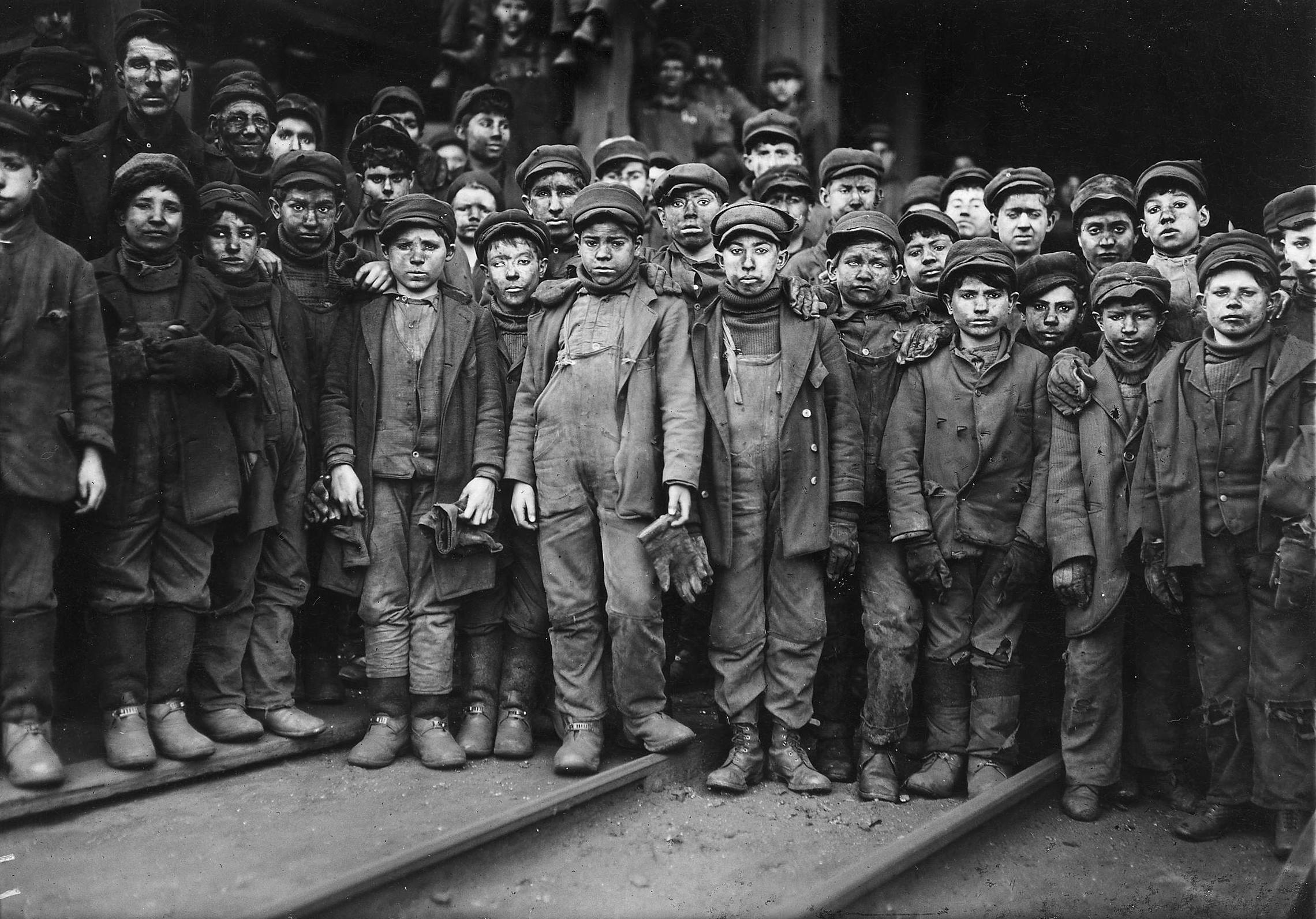
Breaker Boys, 1910, by Lewis Hine; Child laborers working in the coal industry in Pittston, Pennsylvania.

The same Hines photo with false captions added

O'Callaghan's claims were repeated on Irish genealogy websites, the Canadian conspiracy theory website GlobalResearch.ca, and Niall O'Dowd's IrishCentral. The 2008 article on GlobalResearch.ca has been a significant online source for the myth, having been shared almost a million times by March 2016. The myth has been spread on white nationalist message boards, neo-Nazi websites, the far-right conspiracy website InfoWars, and has been shared millions of times on Facebook.

The myth was shared in the form of a meme, frequently used historical paintings or photographs purposefully misidentified via historical falsifications. For example, images of child labourers, paintings of Roman-era slaves, and photographs of prisoners of war were all falsely captioned as evidence of Irish slaves.

"Almost all of the popular 'Irish slaves' articles are promoted by websites or Facebook groups based in the U.S. So it’s predominantly a social media phenomenon of white America." The myth is especially popular with apologists for the Confederate States of America, the secessionist slave states of the South during the American Civil War.

The myth has been a common trope on the white supremacist website Stormfront since 2003. It has circulated widely in the United States, and has recently begun to become common in Ireland after the "Irish slaves" meme went viral on social media in 2013. After the 2014 arrival of the Black Lives Matter movement, the myth was frequently referenced by right-wing white Americans attempting to undermine it and other African-American civil rights issues, according to Aidan McQuade, director of Anti-Slavery International.

In August 2015, the meme was referred to in the context of debates about the continued flying of the Confederate flag, following the Charleston church shooting.

In May 2016, it was referenced by prominent members of Sinn Féin, after their leader Gerry Adams, "while seeking to compare the treatment of African Americans with Catholics in Northern Ireland", became involved in a controversy over his use of the word "nigger" in a false-equivalence reference to Irish nationalists in Northern Ireland.

Irish Times columnist Donald Clarke criticises the myth as being racist, writing that "more commonly we see racists using the myth to belittle the suffering visited on black slaves and to siphon some sympathy towards their own clan." According to The New York Times, the myth is "often politically motivated" and has been used to create "racist barbs" against African-Americans.

Several online articles about "Irish slaves" substituted the 132 African victims of the 1781 Zong massacre with Irish victims. GlobalResearch.ca and InfoWars, both conspiracy websites, inflated the number from 132 victims to 1,302 during such substitutions. In 2015, independent scholar Liam Hogan theorized that the juxtaposing of the Zong massacre with Irish penal labourers originated with a 2002 article, by James Mullin, then chair of the New Jersey–based Irish Famine Curriculum Committee and Education Fund, titled, "Out of Africa". Though Mullin did not misidentify the victims of the Zong Massacre, his article nevertheless blurred the line between the history of African slavery in colonial America with the history of Irish indentured servants sent to English colonies in North America.

== Academic criticism and responses ==
The Irish Examiner removed an article that cited John Martin's 'Globalresearch.ca' piece from its website in early 2016 after 82 writers, historians and academics wrote an open letter condemning the myth. Scientific American published a blog post in 2015, which was also debunked in the open letter, and later heavily revised the blog to remove the incorrect historical material.

Writing in The New York Times, Liam Stack noted that inaccurate "Irish slavery" claims "also appeared on IrishCentral, a leading Irish-American news website." In 2017 IrishCentral's publisher Niall O'Dowd then wrote an op-ed in which he states that "there is no way the Irish slave experience mirrored the extent or level of centuries-long degradation that African slaves went through." In 2020, the website said that propagation of false social media about Irish slaves are "attempts to trivialize and deny centuries institutionalized, race-based slavery."

Sean O'Callaghan's book To Hell or Barbados in particular has been criticised by, among others, Nini Rodgers, who stated that his narrative appeared to arise from his horror at seeing white people being treated on the same social level with blacks. Bryan Fanning notes the book ignored scholarly research. Anthropologist Mark Auslander states in a 2017 article that the current racial climate is leaning toward denial of certain events in history: "There is a strange war on memory that's going on right now, denying the facts of chattel slavery, or claiming to have learned on Facebook or social media that, say, Irish slavery was worse, that white people were enslaved as well. Not true."

Historians note that unlike slaves, many indentured servants willingly entered into contracts, served for a finite period, did not pass their unfree status on to their children, and were still considered fully human. In Jezebel, Matthew Reilly states clearly: "The Irish slave myth is not supported by the historical evidence. Thousands of Irish were sent to colonies like Barbados against their will, never to return. Upon their arrival, however, they were socially and legally distinct from the enslaved Africans with whom they often labored.

While not denying the vast hardships endured by indentured servants, it is necessary to recognize the differences between forms of labor in order to understand the depths of the inhumane system of chattel slavery that endured in the region for several centuries, as well as the legacies of race-based slavery in our own times." According to Hogan, the debate over the exact definition of slavery allowed for a grey area in historical discourse that was then seized upon as a political weapon by white supremacists.

== See also ==
- Becoming white thesis
- Ellis Island Special
- Irish indentured servants
- Irish nationalism
- Racism in Ireland
- Slavery in Ireland – medieval slavery in Ireland and Irish participation in the transatlantic slave trade
- Penal transportation – transportation of British convicts
- White slave propaganda – American abolitionist propaganda using white-looking slaves
- White slavery
