= Sean O'Callaghan (journalist) =

Irish journalist and non-fiction author (1918–2000)

- Born: 1918
- Died: 2000 (aged 81–82)
- Occupations: Journalist, non-fiction author

Seán O'Callaghan, born John Callaghan, (1918-2000) was an Irish journalist and non-fiction author.

Born in Killavullen, County Cork, after service in the Irish Army he moved to England, working as a journalist there and after 1952, as a correspondent in Africa. He later moved to Malta. His 2001 book, To Hell or Barbados: The ethnic cleansing of Ireland, claimed that many thousands of Irish men, women and children were transported against their will to Barbados as slaves after the Cromwellian conquest of Ireland. In the Caribbean, these people were typically sold to planters to work their sugar estates. Though technically indentured servants with the right to be released after a term of years, most did not survive long enough to regain freedom due to harsh treatment and an unfamiliarity with tropical conditions. His ideas have been criticized by some historians (see Irish slaves myth). They accuse O'Callaghan of overstating the harsh conditions faced by Irish indentured servants as well as being an unwitting tool of white supremacists, who try to use the Cromwell era transport and other examples of Irish indentured servitude to down play what African enslaved people suffered.

== Selected publications ==
- The Easter Lily (1957)
- The Jackboot in Ireland. Allan Wingate, London, 1958.
- To Hell or Barbados: The ethnic cleansing of Ireland. O'Brien Press Ltd, Dublin, 2000
