= Abbey of Fontenay =

Cistercian Abbey of Fontenay
UNESCO World Heritage Site
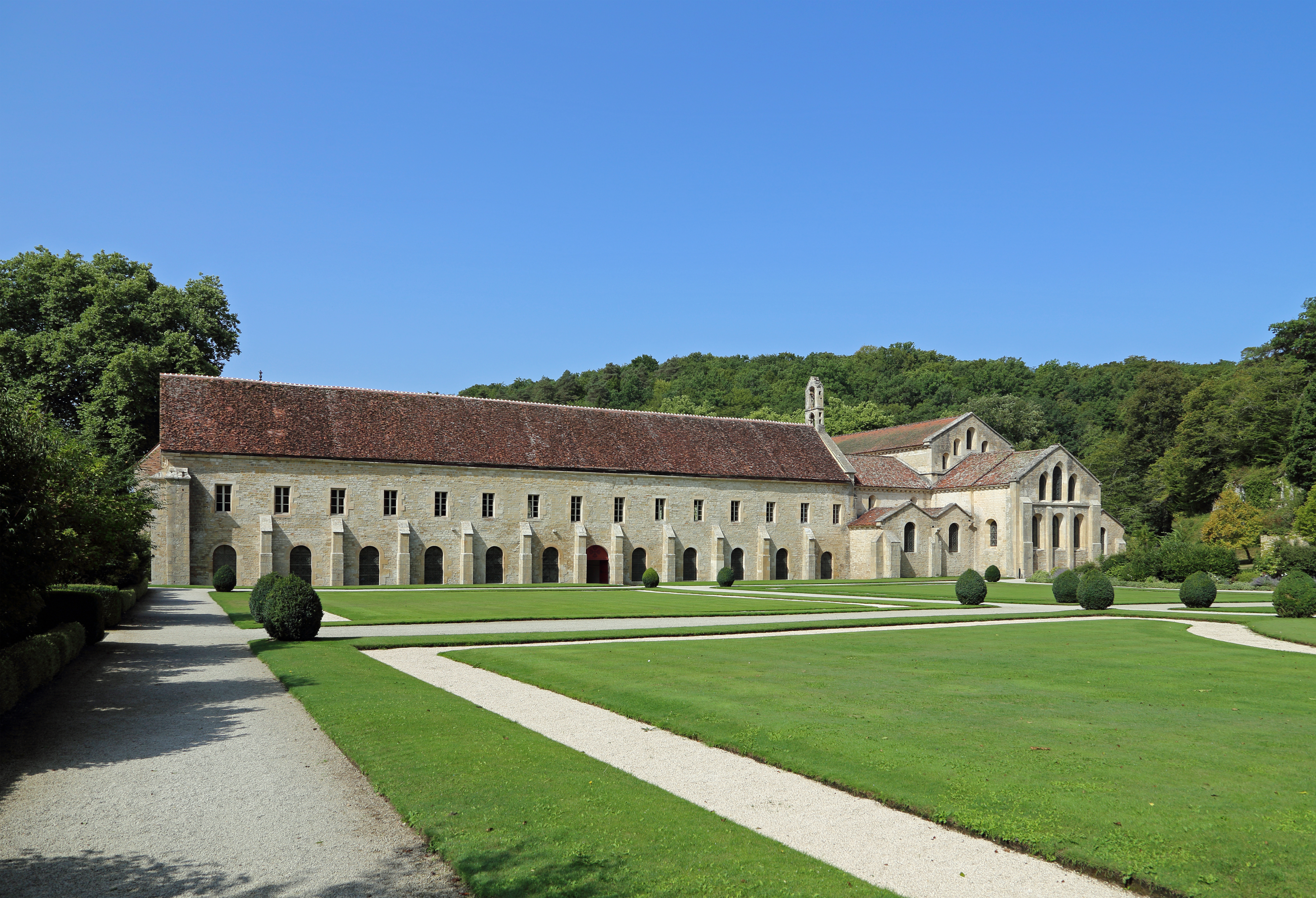

- Location within France
- Location: Marmagne, Côte-d'Or, France
- Criteria: Cultural: (iv)
- Reference: 165bis
- Inscription: 1981 (5th Session)
- Extensions: 2007
- Area: 5.77 ha (14.3 acres)
- Buffer zone: 1,397 ha (3,450 acres)
- Website: www.abbayedefontenay.com/en/
- Coordinates: 47°38′22.0″N 4°23′20.8″E

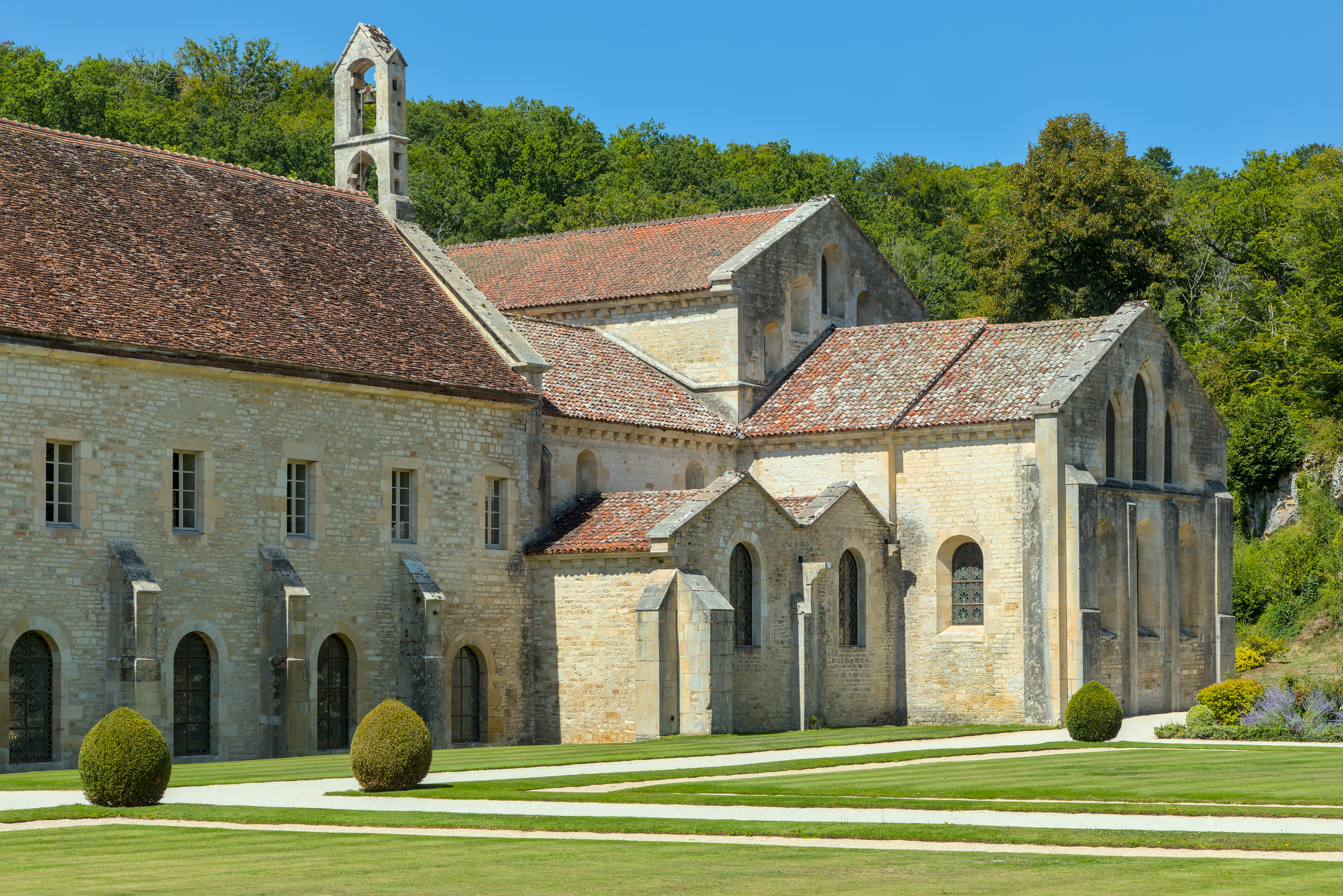
The church and convent building seen from the gardens

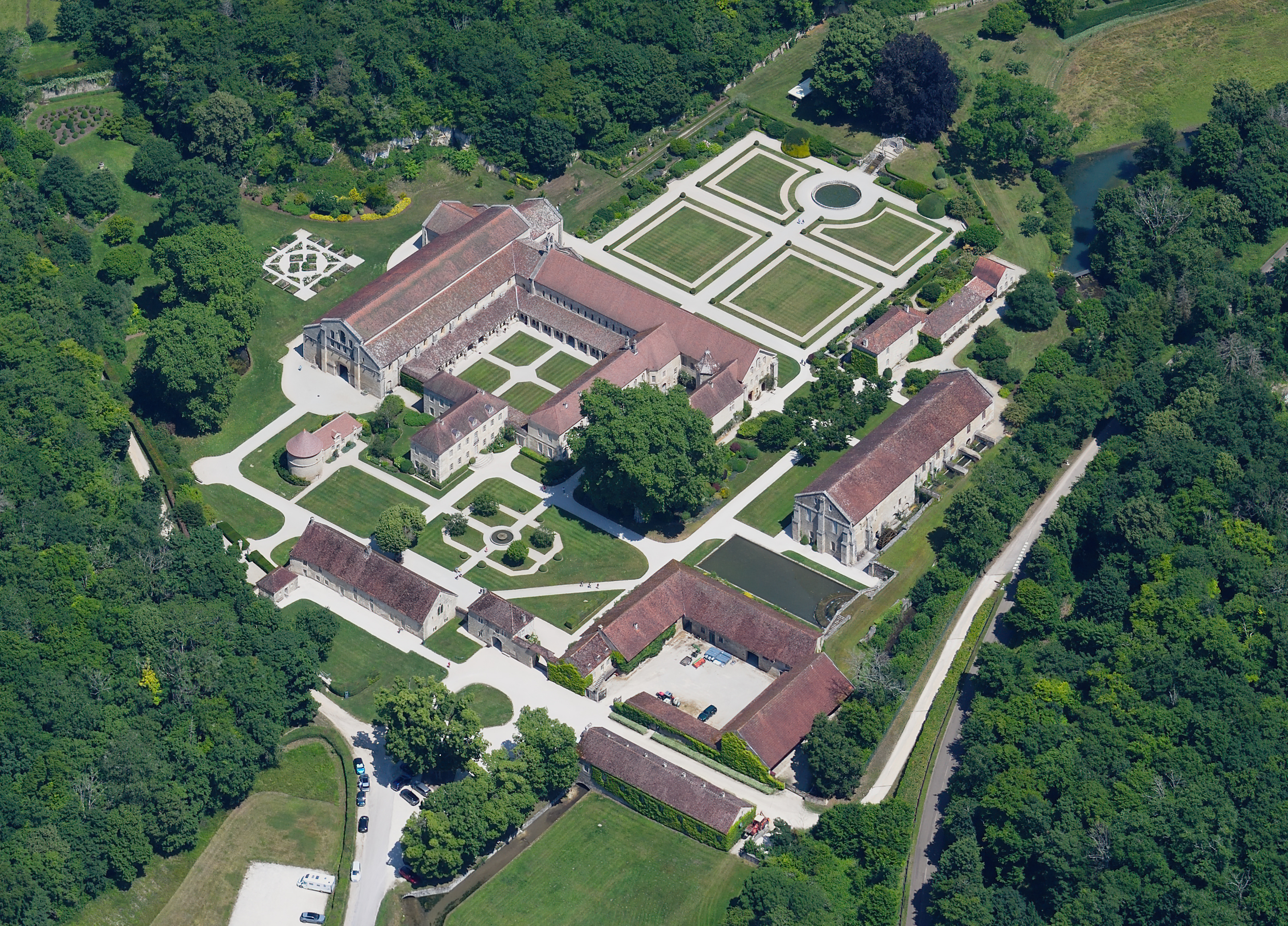
Aerial view of the abbey

The Abbey of Fontenay is a former Cistercian abbey located in the commune of Marmagne, near Montbard, in the département of Côte-d'Or in France. It was founded by Saint Bernard of Clairvaux in 1118, and built in the Romanesque style. It is one of the oldest and most complete Cistercian abbeys in Europe, and became a UNESCO World Heritage Site in 1981. Of the original complex comprising church, dormitory, cloister, chapter house, caldarium, refectory, dovecote and the so-called "forge", all remain intact except the refectory and are well maintained. The Abbey of Fontenay, along with other Cistercian abbeys, forms a connecting link between Romanesque and Gothic architecture.

== History ==
=== Foundation of the order ===
In the late 11th century during the heyday of the great church of Cluny III (a magnificent Benedictine monastery in Cluny, France), although Cluny had numerous followers, Saint Robert of Molesme, the subsequent founder of Cîteaux Abbey, led a strong reaction against it. Saint Robert thought that Cluny was against the actual Rule of Saint Benedict: “to work is to pray”. As a result, Saint Robert, along with a group of monks who shared this belief, detached from Cluny.

Saint Robert established the Order of Cistercians in Citeaux, France. The new order strictly observed the Rule of Saint Benedict. As part of this rule, monks had to be poor and live a simple life. In order not to be distracted from the religious life, Cistercians built self-sufficient monasteries in isolated areas and refused to use servants. Cistercian monasteries were independent. They differed from Cluny in that all houses were under the direct control of the abbot, and each Cistercian monastery needed to take care of its own. Each of them was most likely an independent individual society.

Bernard of Clairvaux, an abbot and the primary builder of the reformed Cistercian order, shared the same faith with Saint Robert of Molesme. However, Bernard felt that Cîteaux Abbey was not austere enough and did not completely reflect the Rule of Saint Benedict. Thus, in 1118 he founded the Abbey of Fontenay in a Burgundy valley with strictly implemented austerity.

=== History of the abbey ===
The Cistercian monks moved to Fontenay Abbey in 1130. Nine years later, the Bishop of Norwich fled to Fontenay to escape persecution, and helped finance the construction of the church with his wealth. The church was consecrated in 1147 by Pope Eugene III.

By 1200 the monastic complex was complete and able to serve as many as 300 monks. In 1259, the devout King Louis exempted the Abbey of Fontenay from all taxes, and being in the King's good graces, ten years later the abbey became a royal abbey.

In 1359, the Abbey of Fontenay was pillaged by the armies of King Edward III of England during the Hundred Years' War. It suffered further damage during the Wars of Religion in late 16th century. In 1745, the refectory was destroyed. With the beginning of the French Revolution in 1789 all of the monks successively left the abbey due to dechristianisation during the revolution and in 1791, the site was turned into a paper mill, run by the Montgolfier brothers.

In 1906 Edouard Aynard, an art-loving banker from Lyon, bought the abbey and commenced its restoration which was complete by 1911. Edouard's descendants continued to work on the abbey and it remains in the Aynard family to this day. In 1981 the abbey became a UNESCO World Heritage Site.

== Architecture ==
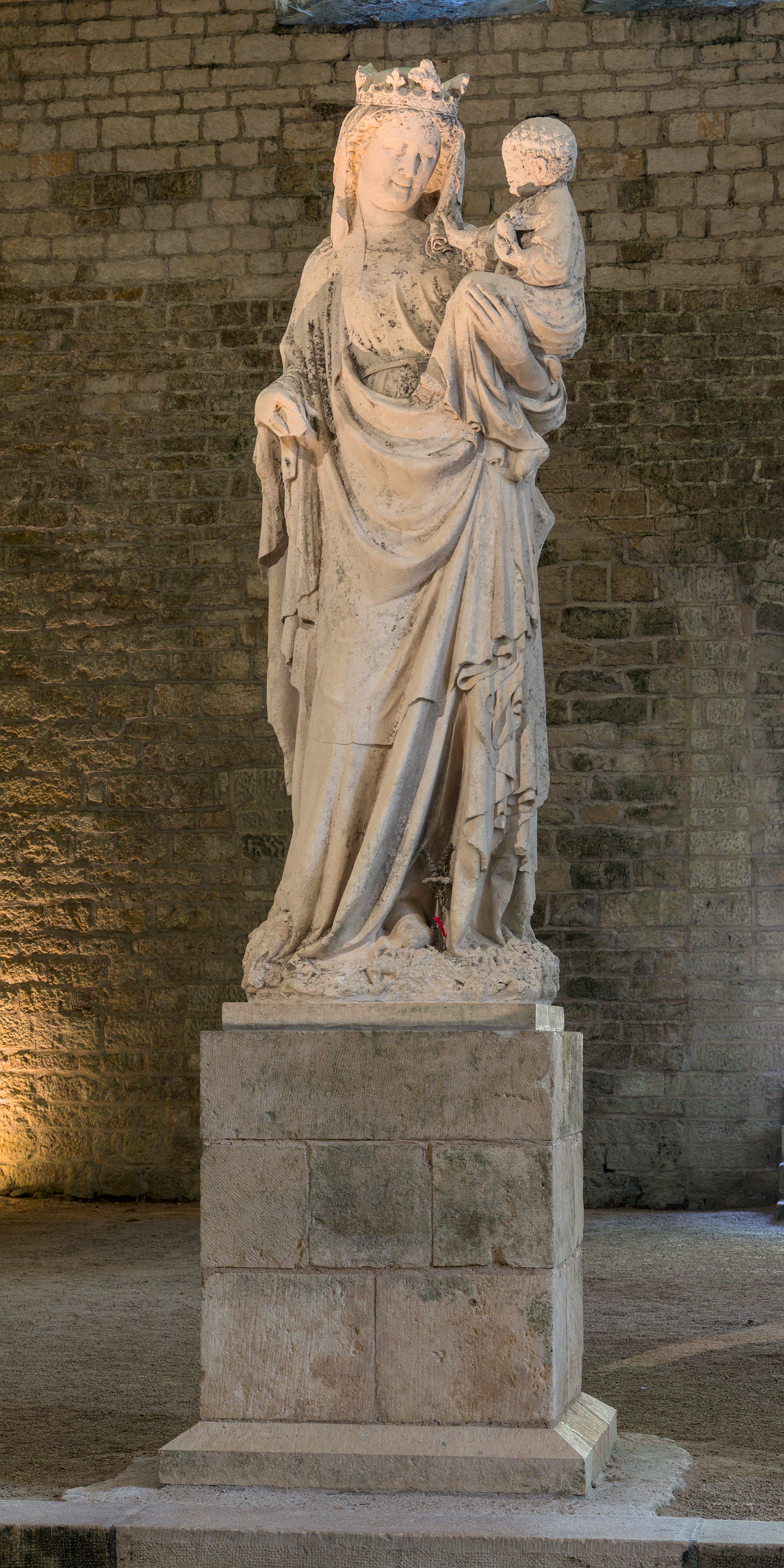
The Virgin of Fontenay

=== Background ===
All Cistercian churches have the same model and are similar to one another; for example, Graiguenamanagh Abbey's church, built in Ireland in 1204, has a floor plan closely resembling that of Fontenay. The spirit of Cistercian architecture is simple, conservative, and utilitarian. Cistercian monastery churches feature Romanesque architecture, including symmetrical plan, massive walls, sturdy piers, groin vaults, round arches, and a tall central nave. In medieval Europe, the Cistercian ethic of manual labor work became "the main force of technological diffusion" in many fields, including metallurgy.

=== Buildings ===
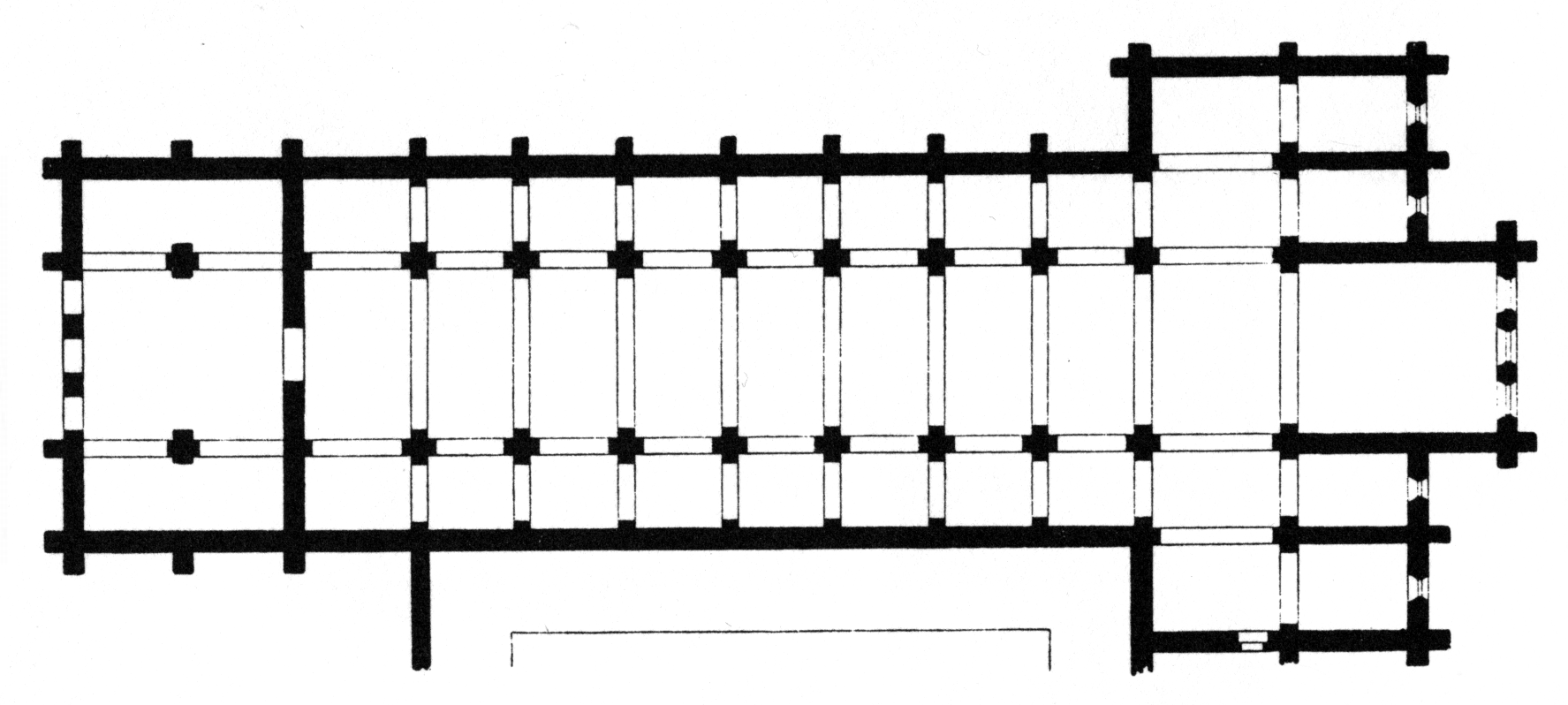
Plan of the church.

The Abbey was primarily constructed using stones from local areas. The church of the abbey is of typical Cistercian architecture, built in the Romanesque style. It is in a Latin cross shape, with a nave 66 metres long and 8 metres wide, two side-aisles, and a transept measuring 19 metres. In contrast to earlier churches, the church of the abbey has a flattened apse and two rectangular (instead of semicircular) chapels of each side of the transept. The cloister measures 36 by 38 metres. The chapter house is vaulted, with heavy ribs. There is a large dormitory which was re-roofed in the fifteenth century with an arched braced roof of chestnut timber.

Except for the demolished refectory, the abbey retains almost all of its original buildings: church, dormitory, cloister, chapter house, caldarium or "warming room", dovecote and the so-called "forge", all built in Romanesque style. The abbot's lodgings and infirmary were built at a later date. Today the abbey buildings are set in modern manicured parterres of lawn and gravel.

The structure known as "the forge", with a floor area of 53.3 × 13.5 metres, is located 30 metres south of the main complex. Traditionally, it was often interpreted as a forge or multifunctional workshop building. However, there is no architectural or historical evidence for this and architectural comparisons suggest that it was used as a brewery and/or bakehouse.

In all of the original buildings, neither the exteriors nor interiors are decorated. Although Bernard of Clairvaux did not attempt to reject art or beauty, he was cautious of "those manifestations of beauty which lead the eyes of the mind away from the imago Dei (image of God) to the imagines mundi (images of the world)." Although there are no flowers in the capitals, no decorative motifs and no images anywhere, the abbey is still an outstanding artwork.

The church and the cloister, the centre of life for monks, were built in logically distributed spaces. In anticipation of the monastery's future expansion, instead of creating an enclosed structure, the church and the cloister were created parallel or perpendicular to each other with open ends. In this way, during expansion the existing cloister and church would not be influenced.

There is no bell tower in the abbey, because Bernard of Clairvaux felt this would take away from the austerity. As an alternative, small bells were attached into the wall beside the church door to call lay brothers to gather together.

In the interior of the church, massive cruciform piers sustain high, large barrel vaults consisting of pointed arches and transverse pointed arches. Diaphragm pointed arches are also evident. The abundant use of pointed arches was chosen because “the pointed arch channels the weight onto the bearing piers or columns at a steep angle,” and will support a tall building for thousands of years.

Bernard of Clairvaux, who constrained decoration, believed that only light should enter the church. For a long time it was also believed that perfect proportions can be achieved through music. Thus, when designing the glass windows, numerical ratios corresponding to music were applied. For instance, the seven windows in the west of the interior were distributed according to a musical ratio of 3/4.

The thirty-six meter cloister located at the back of the church is divided by pillars into small galleries. In each gallery, double column pillars with lanceolate capitals support a double arches vault. This cloister was an important place for monks to spend their spare time reading, working and praying.

== Gallery ==
This World Heritage Site has retained the greater part of its Romanesque and Early Gothic monastic buildings, giving uniquely intact picture of a Cistercian monastery of the 12th century.

The abbey church

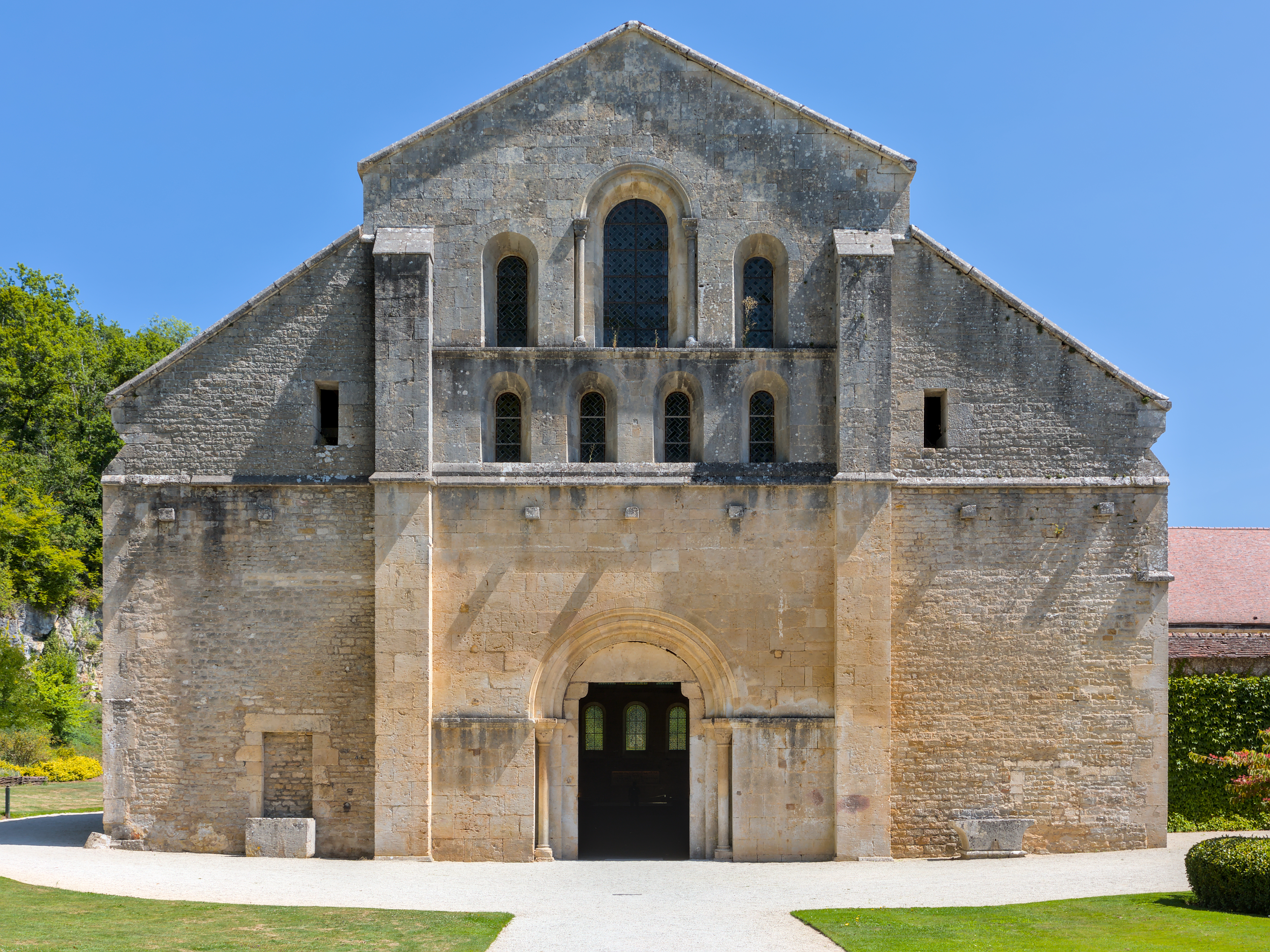
Main facade

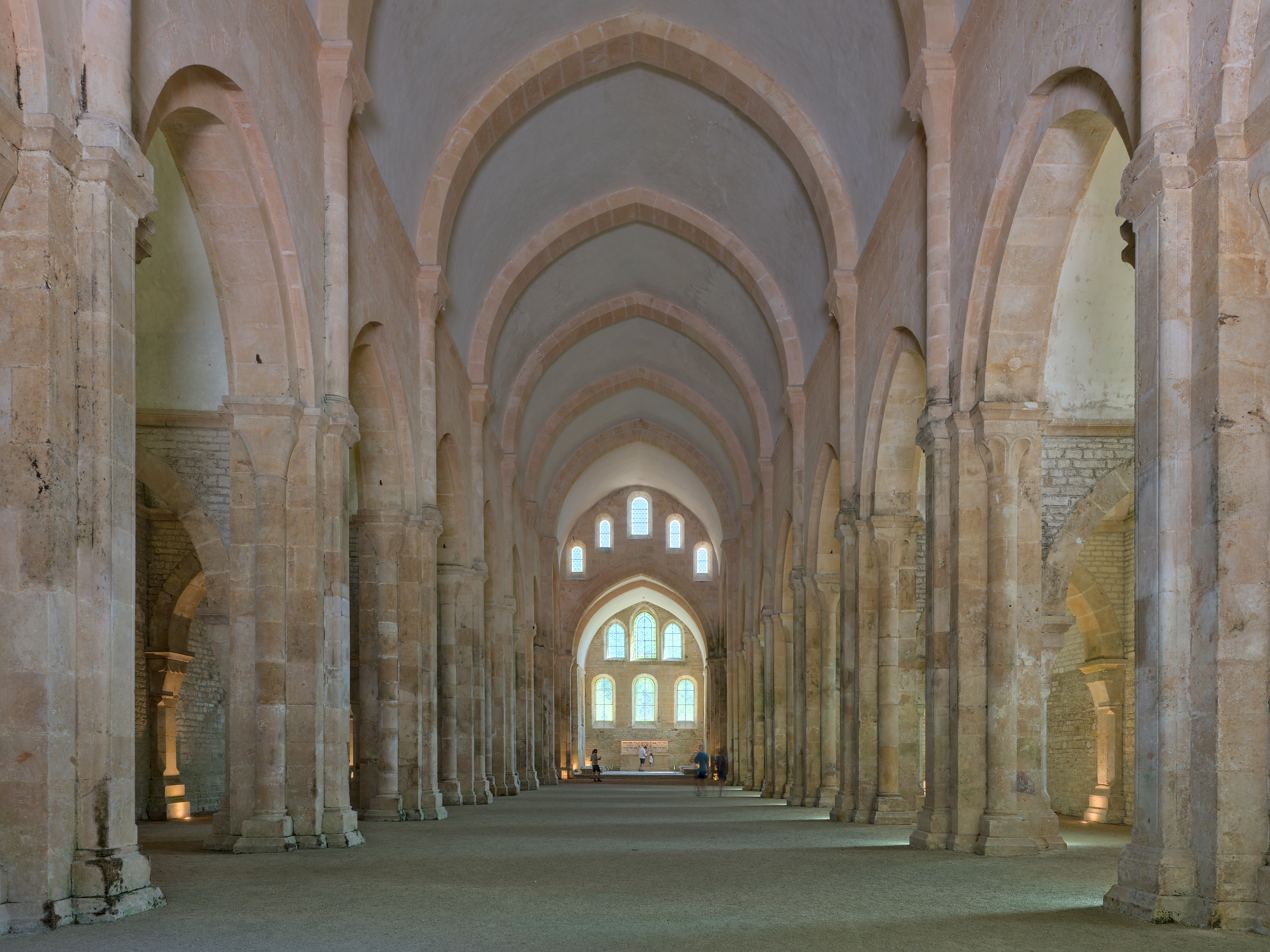
Interior

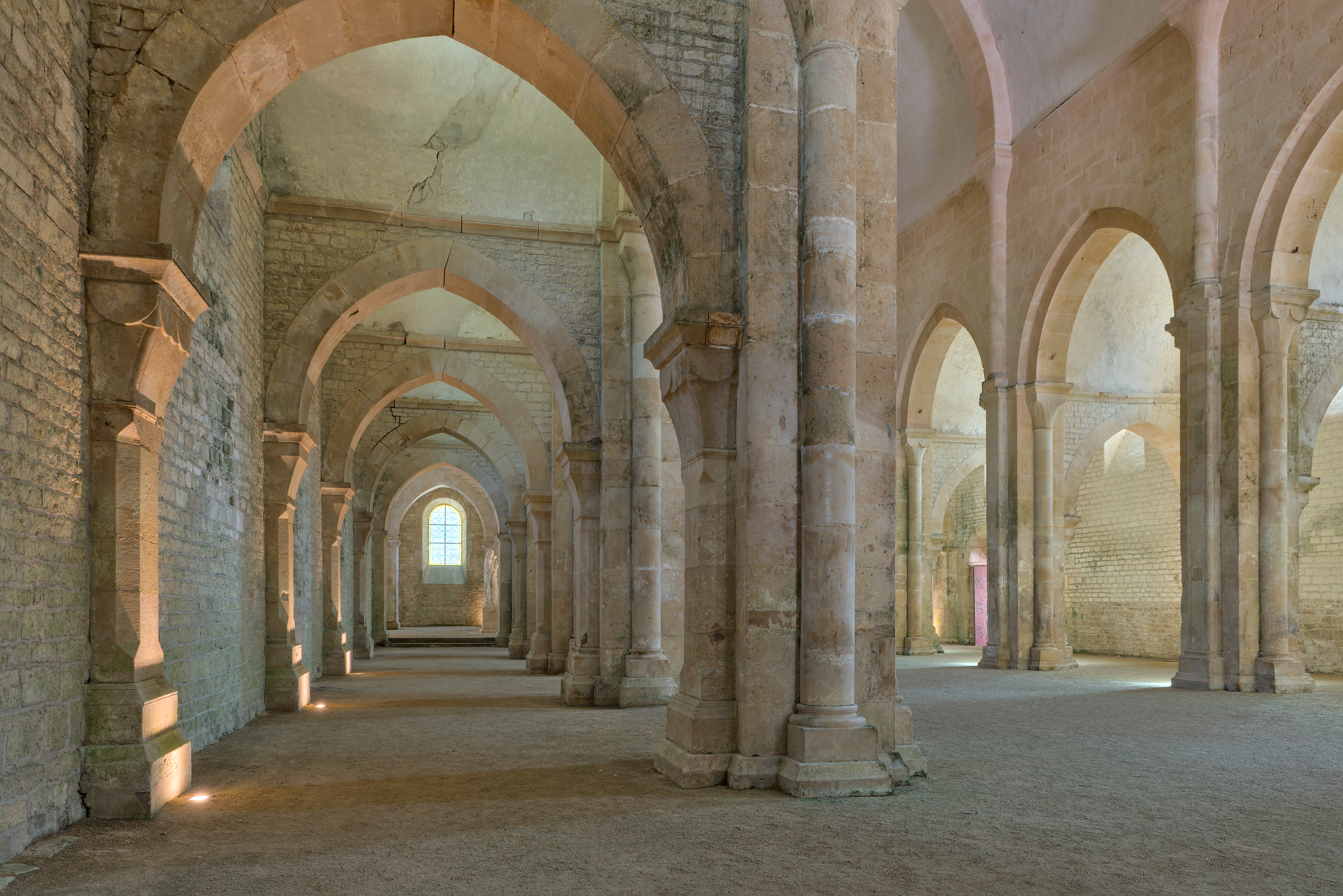
Interior

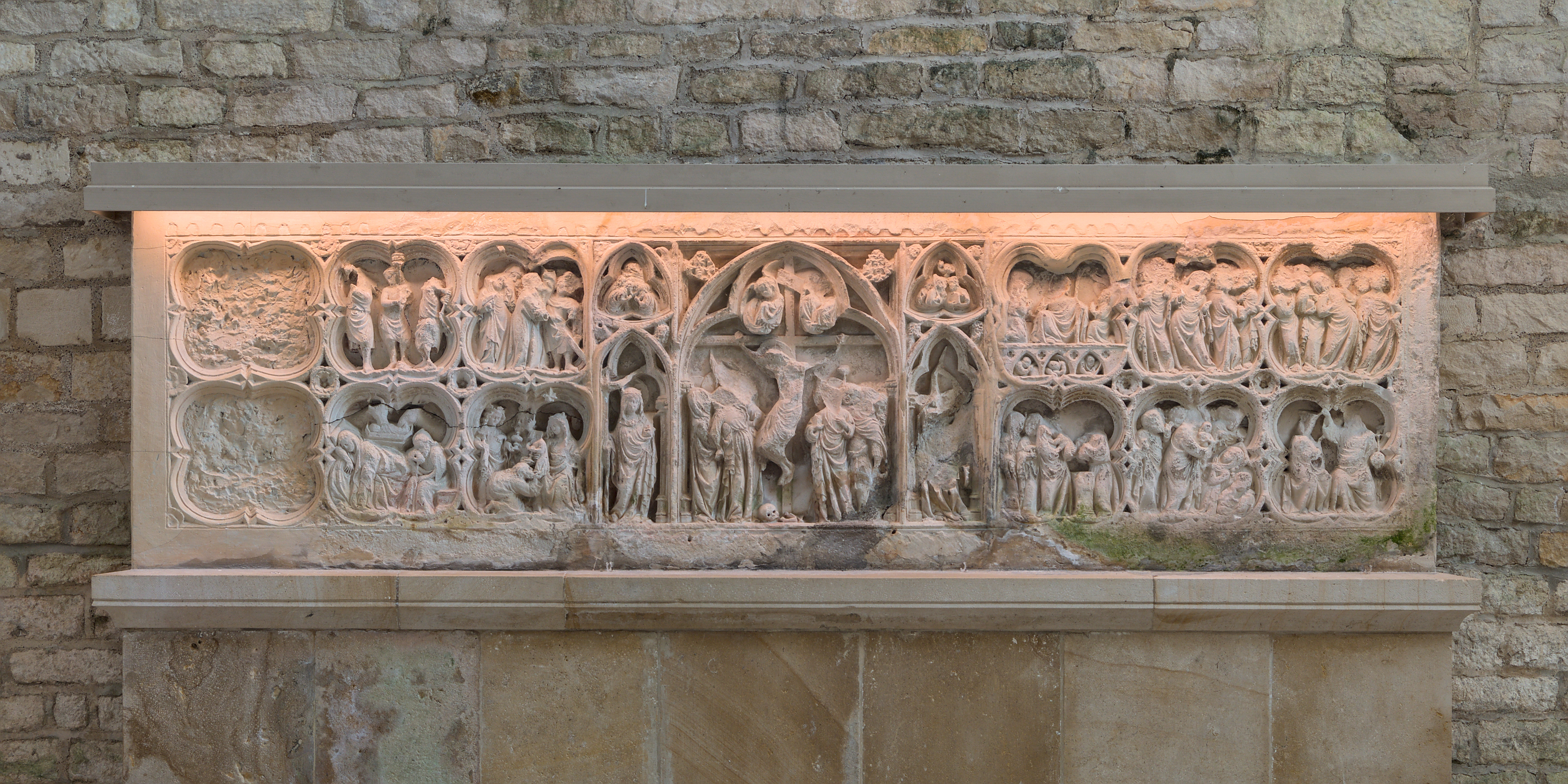
Altarpiece

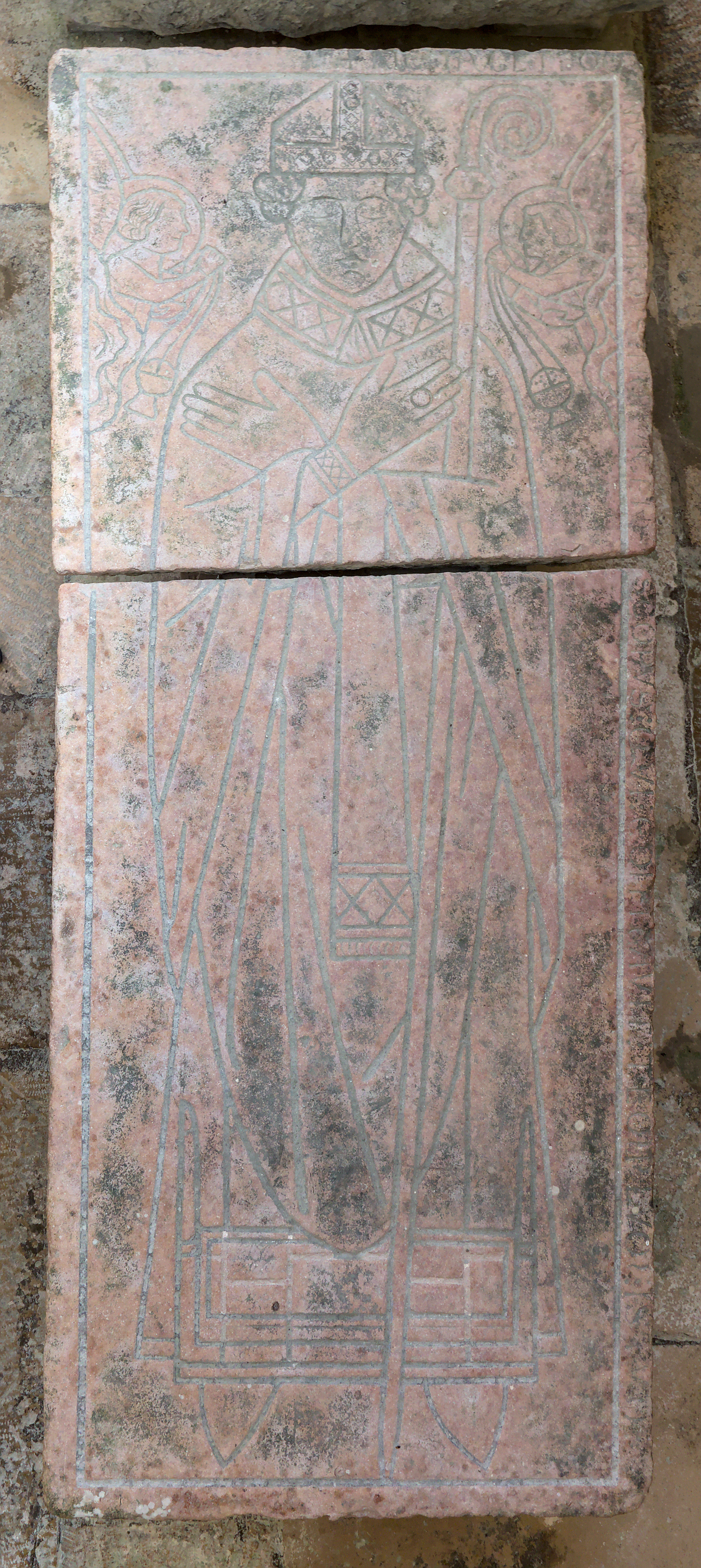
Gravestone of Everard of Calne
Other buildings

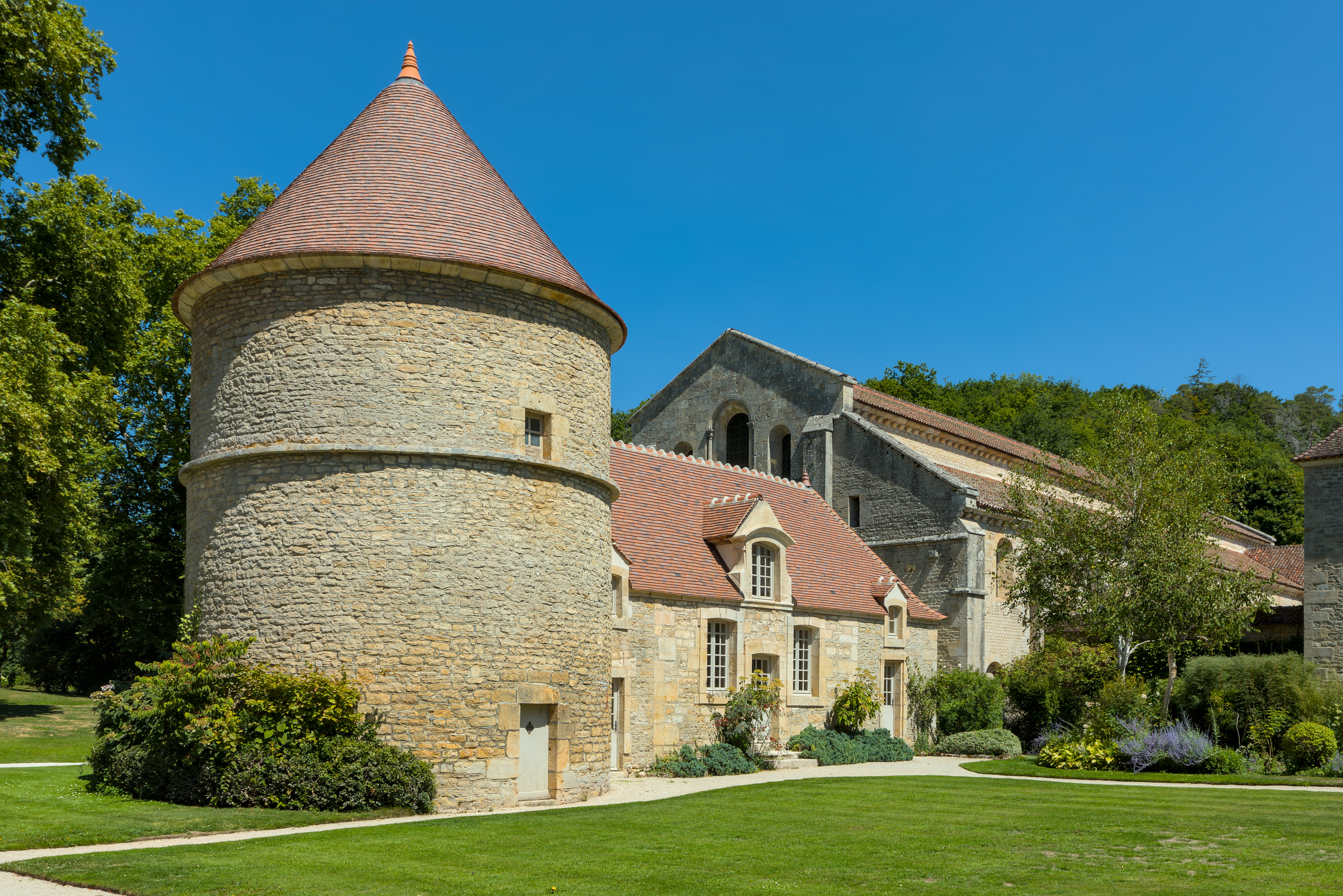
View of the dovecote and church

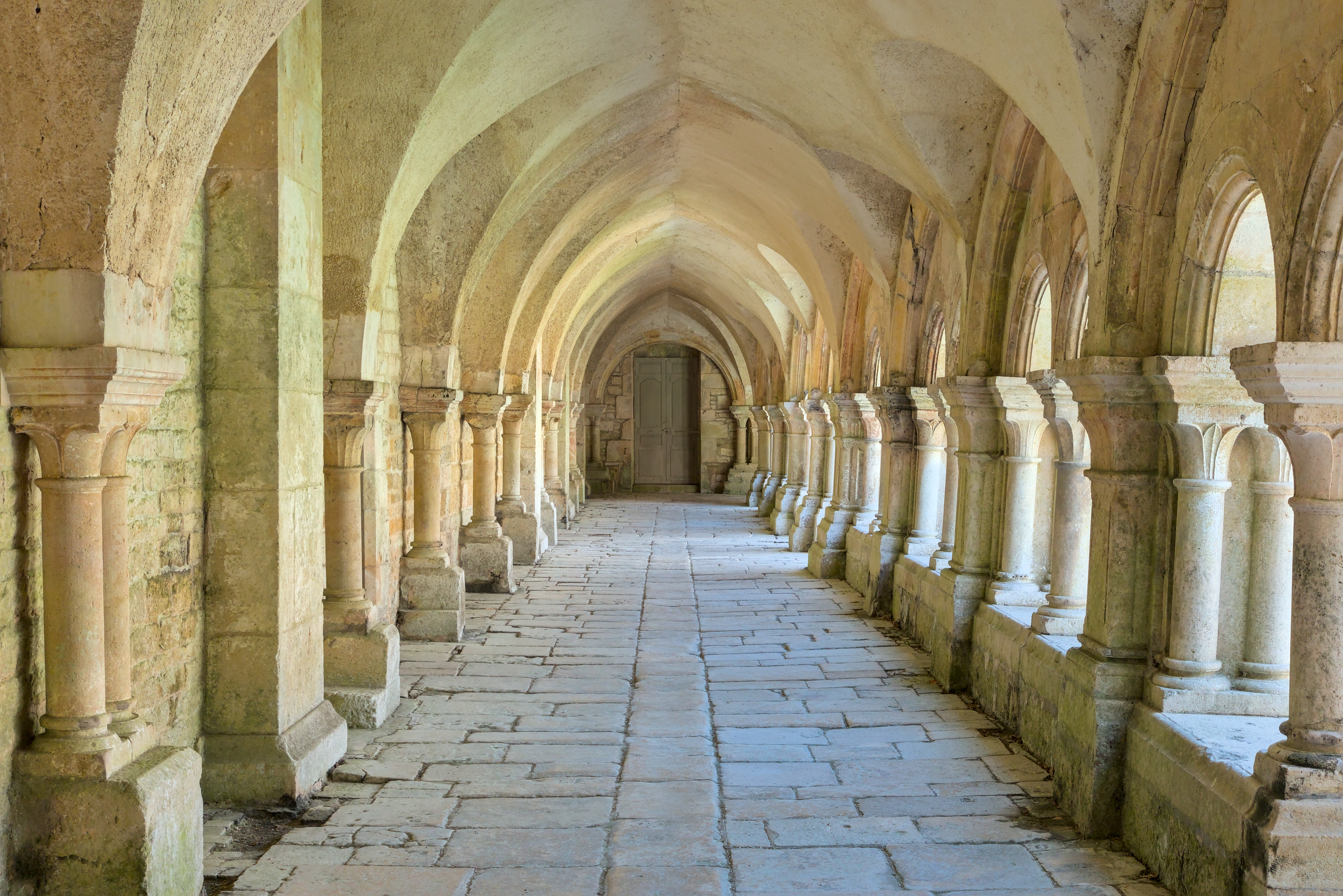
The cloister

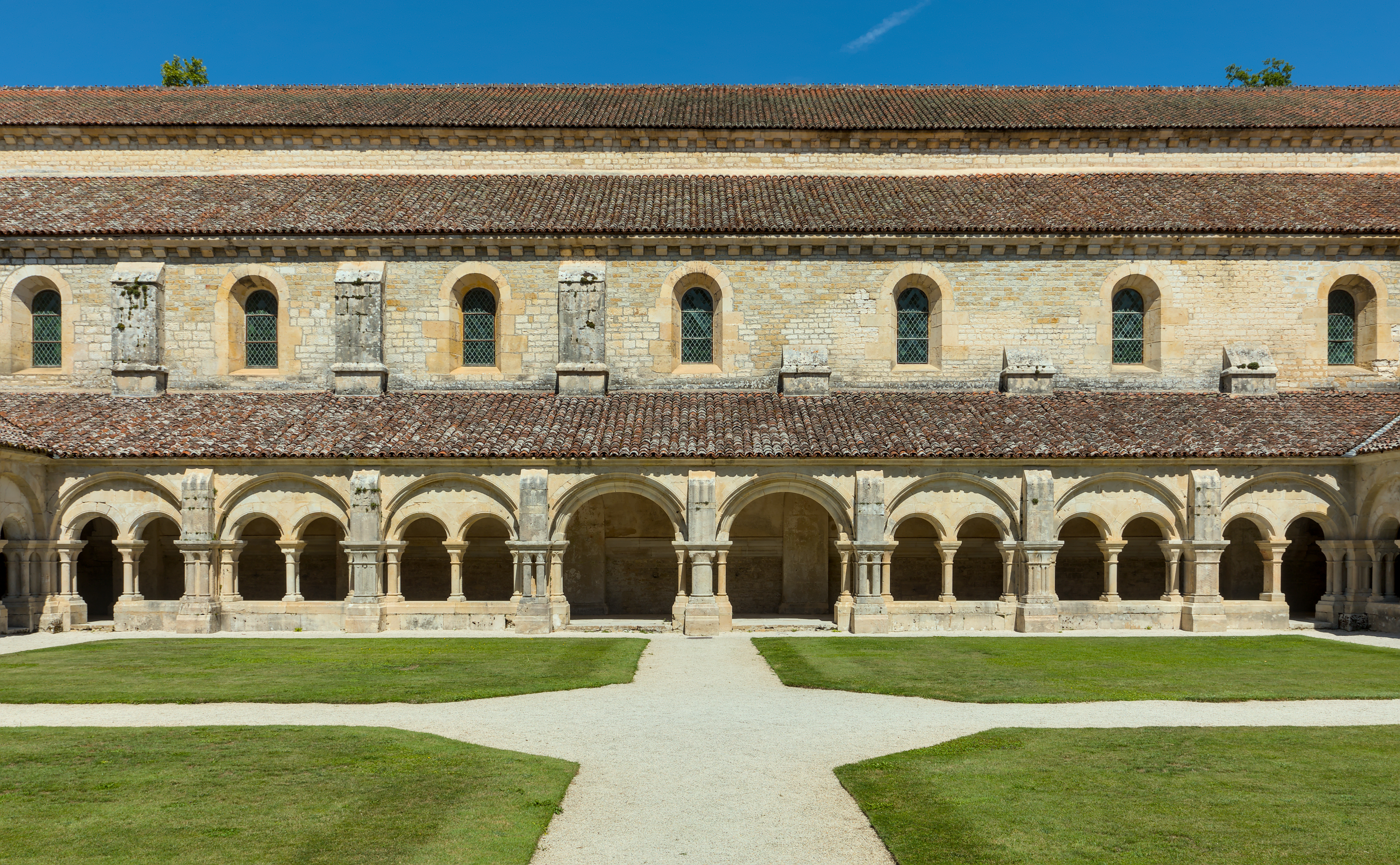
The cloister

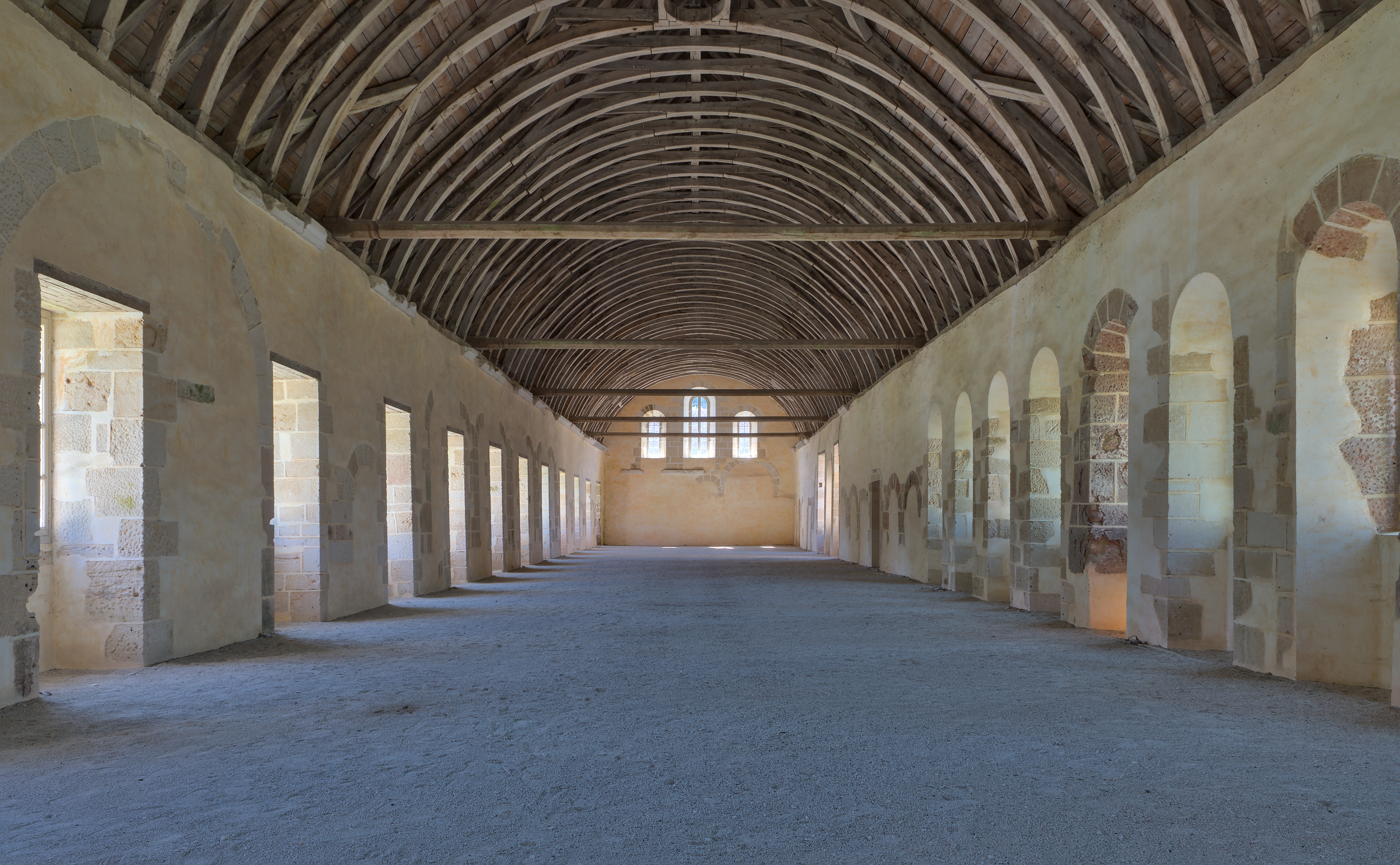
The dormitory

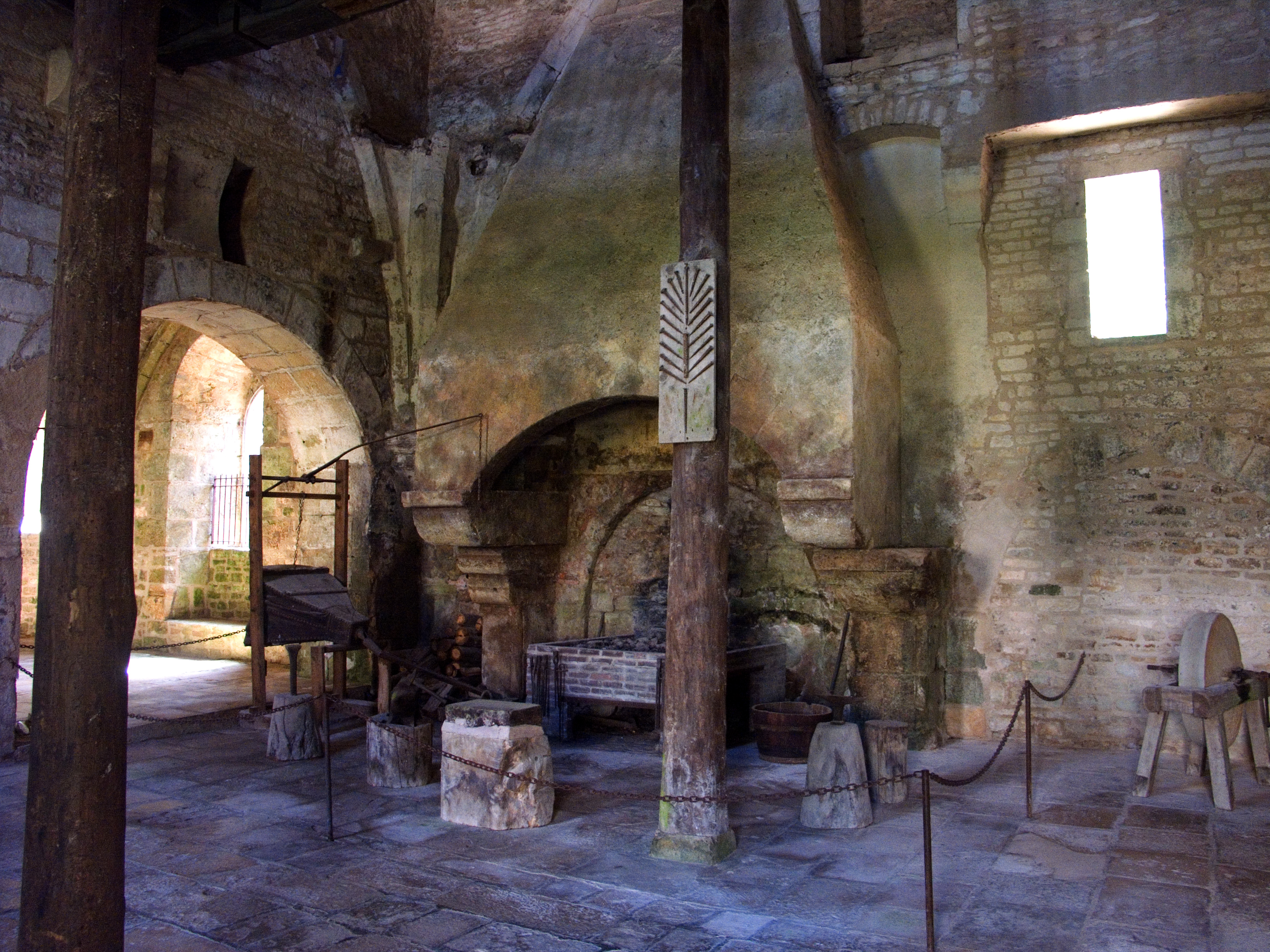
The forge

== See also ==
- List of World Heritage Sites in France
