= John P. Duggan =

Irish Army officer

Lt. Col. John Patrick Duggan (15 July1918 – 8 March 2013) was an Irish army officer born in Kilmallock and later the registrar of the Dublin Institute for Advanced Studies

== Selected publications ==
- Neutral Ireland and the Third Reich. Gill and Macmillan, Dublin, 1985.
- A History of the Irish Army. Gill and Macmillan, Dublin, 1991.
- Herr Hempel at the German legation in Dublin 1937–1945. Irish Academic Press, Dublin, 2002. ISBN 0-7165-2746-4
