= Slavery in Ireland =

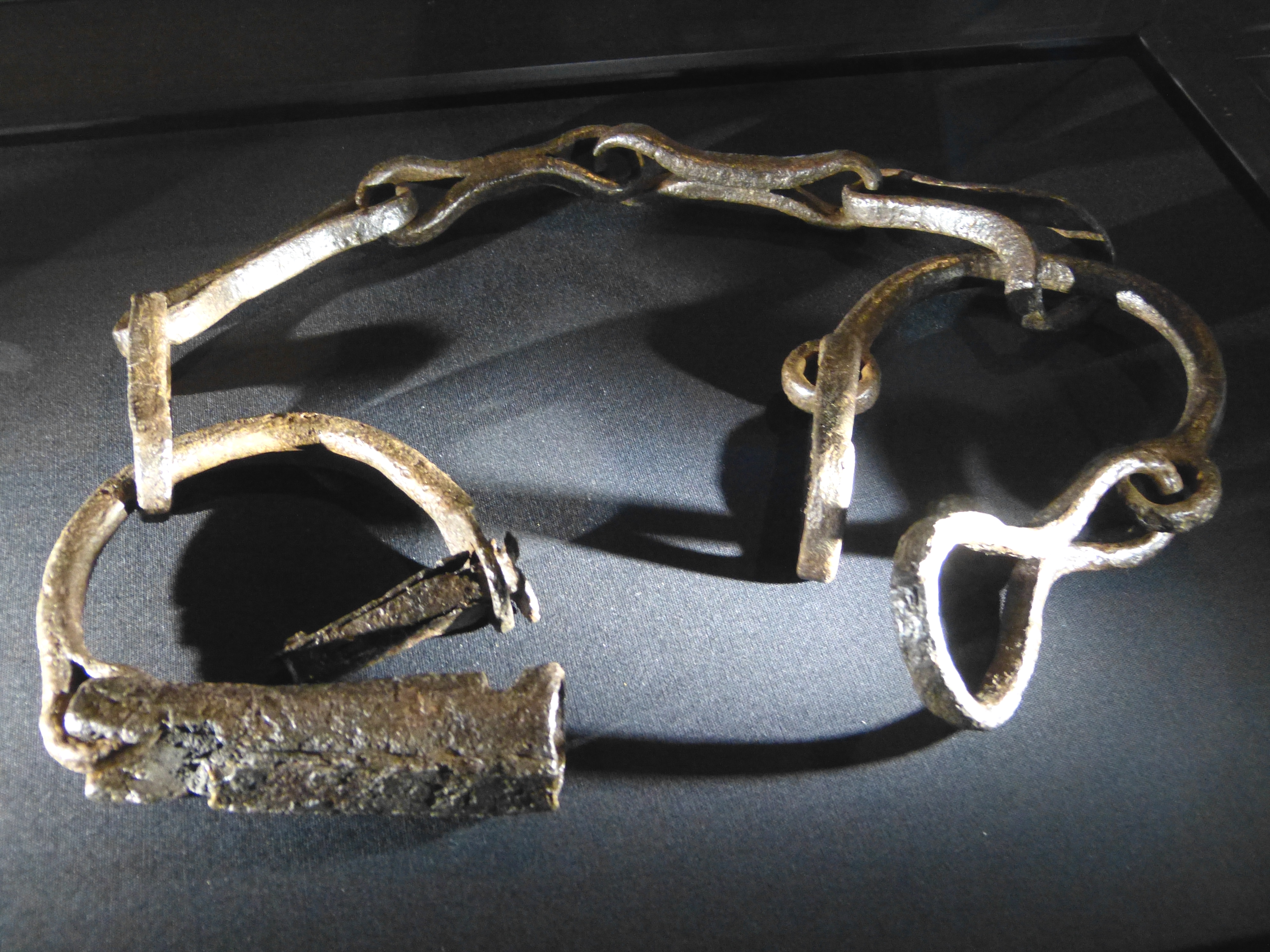
Viking Age slave chain (found in Germany)

Slavery had already existed in Ireland for centuries by the time the Vikings began to establish their coastal settlements, but it was under the Norse-Gael Kingdom of Dublin that it reached its peak, in the 11th century.

== History ==
=== Gaelic Ireland ===
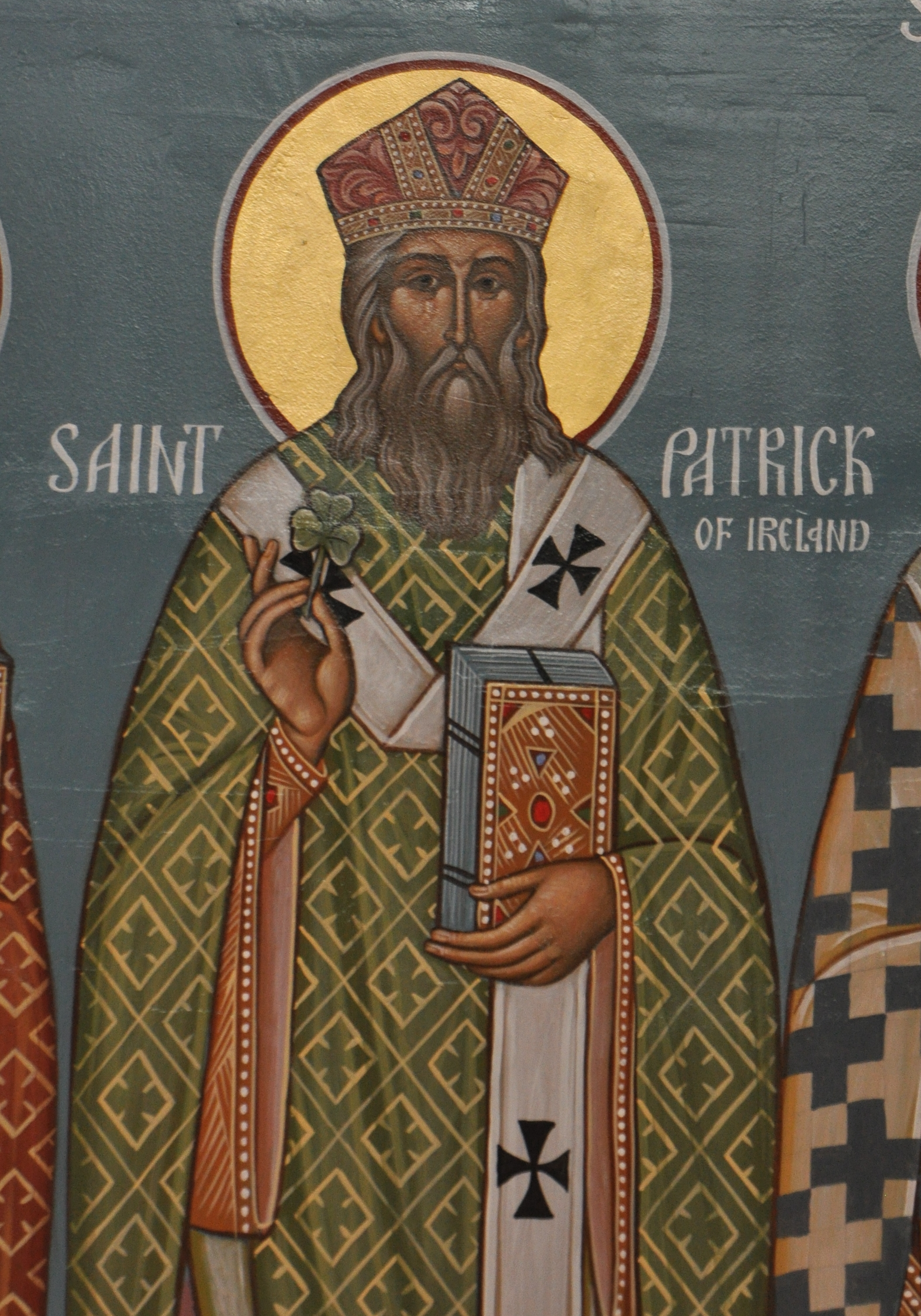
As a young man, Saint Patrick was kidnapped by Irish pirates, transported to Ireland, and sold as a slave.

After the Fall of the Western Roman Empire destabilised Britain in the early 5th century, Irish raiders kidnapped and enslaved people from across the Irish Sea up until the 7th century. Saint Patrick was kidnapped and brought to Ireland around this time.

In the Brehon Laws, Senchus Mór [Shanahus More] and the Book of Acaill [Ack'ill], a "daer fuidhir" ("servile inferior") was a name applied to all who did not belong to a clan, whether born in the clan territory or not. This was the lowest of the three classes of the non-free people. This class also was sub-divided into saer and daer, the daer fuidhirs being the class most closely resembling slaves. Even this lowest condition was not utterly hopeless; promotion was possible, and in constant operation. Therefore all families did not remain permanently in this kind of servitude but had the possibility of gradually rising from a lower to a higher degree according to a certain scale of progress, unless they committed some crime which would arrest that progress and cast them down again further. Slaves could be obtained through war, purchase and marriage to outsiders. The inheritability of slavery depends on the precise original relationship, while fuidher have been seen as a transitional status, after three generations serving the same lord, their children fell under the category senchléithe, akin to a semi hereditary serf status, while the law texts also provide details of downward mobility as well.

=== Viking period ===
From the 9th to the 12th century Viking/Norse-Gael Dublin in particular was a major slave trading centre which led to an increase in slavery. In 870, Vikings, most likely led by Olaf the White and Ivar the Boneless, besieged and captured the stronghold of Dumbarton Castle (Alt Clut), the capital of the Kingdom of Strathclyde in Scotland, and the next year took most of the site's inhabitants to the Dublin slave markets.

When the Vikings established early Scandinavian Dublin in 841, they began a slave market that would come to sell thralls captured both in Ireland and other countries as distant as Muslim Spain, as well as sending Irish slaves as far away as Iceland, where Gaels formed 40% of the founding population, and Anatolia. In 875, Irish slaves in Iceland launched Europe's largest slave rebellion since the end of the Roman Empire, when Hjörleifr Hróðmarsson's slaves killed him and fled to Vestmannaeyjar. Almost all recorded slave raids in this period took place in Leinster and southeast Ulster; while there was almost certainly similar activity in the south and west, only one raid from the Hebrides on the Aran Islands is recorded.

Slavery became more prevalent throughout Ireland in the 11th century as port cities built up by Vikings flourished, with Dublin becoming the biggest slave market in Western Europe. Its main sources of supply were the Irish hinterland, Wales and Scotland. The Irish slave trade began to decline after William the Conqueror consolidated control of the English and Welsh coasts around 1080, and was dealt a severe blow when the Normans abolished slavery in 1102. The 1171 Council of Armagh freed all Englishmen and women who were enslaved in Ireland, where contemporary sources detail that the English sold their children as slaves, as stated in the Decree of the Council of Armagh: "For the English people hitherto throughout the whole of their kingdom to the common injury of their people, had become accustomed to selling their sons and relatives in Ireland, to expose their children for sale as slaves, rather than suffer any need or want".

=== Barbary slave trade ===
Baltimore, County Cork, was depopulated in 1631 in the Sack of Baltimore, a raid by Barbary pirates from either Ottoman Algeria or Salé (Morocco). Between 100 and 237 people were abducted and sold into the Barbary slave trade, of whom only two or three ever saw Ireland again.

=== Atlantic slave trade ===
As was true for societies across Europe, Asia, & Africa during this time, there were individuals born in Ireland who became involved with the Atlantic slave trade between 1660 and 1815. Librarian Liam Hogan has described how Irish merchants profited from the trade, mostly indirectly as provisioners.

In more direct involvement for example, William Ronan worked for the Royal African Company and rose to become chairman of the committee of merchants at Cape Coast Castle on the Gold Coast (modern Ghana), running one of the world's largest slave markets between 1687 and 1697. Antoine Walsh, a Frenchman of Irish descent and prominent Jacobite based in Nantes, used his wealth generated from the slave trade to finance the Jacobite rising of 1745. Benjamin McMahon worked for eighteen years as an overseer on Jamaican plantations, later becoming an abolitionist and writing about his experiences. Tralee-born Irishman David Tuohy emigrated to Liverpool and became a captain on slave ships before settling down in the city to manage his business activities, which included the slave trade. Felix Doran (1708–1776) was an Irish Catholic, born in Ireland and moved to Liverpool where he became very wealthy from the slave trade, financing at least 69 slave voyages.

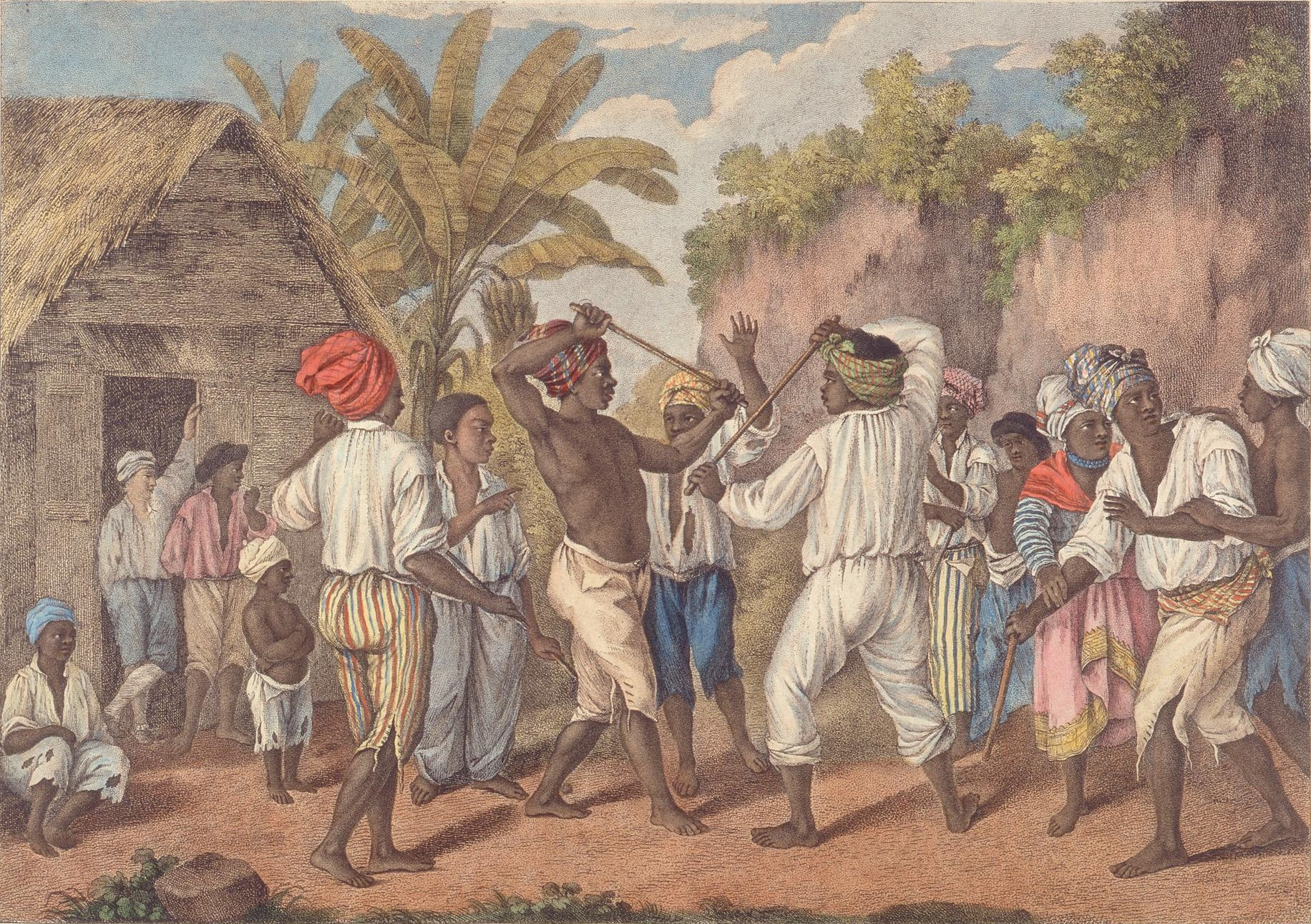
Slaves having a stick fight. A white indentured servant is standing on the left.

Several Caribbean Islands have significant Irish communities descended from indentured servants deported from Ireland by colonial British authorities following the 15th & 16th century Plantations of Ireland, with the like of Montserrat once hosting large Anglo-Irish owned and run sugar plantations that were dependent on slave labour.

Prominent US Civil Rights campaigner Jesse Jackson acknowledges his descent from “Scots-Irish” slave owners (i.e. colonial settlers from Britain who arrived in Ireland in the 17th century during the crown’s Plantation of Ulster) plantation owner, in South Carolina.

An Ulster-Scottish slave-owning great-great grandfather of US Senator Mitch McConnell also came to the US from Ireland. McConnell brought up this family history during the 2020 United States presidential election campaign to liken himself to Barack Obama.

The University College London Legacies of British Slavery database identifies slave owners living with addresses in Ireland compensated by the British Government upon abolition of legal slavery in the British Empire. These were mainly British or Anglo-Irish members of the Protestant Ascendency, or others who took parts in British colonialism such as Howe Peter Browne, who was the British governor of Jamaica from 1834-1836.

=== Modern day ===
The US Department of State criticised Ireland in 2018 for "not meeting the minimum standards for the elimination of trafficking"; types of modern slavery and forced labour include prostitution, trawler fishing and domestic service.

== See also ==
- Racism in Ireland
- Slavery in Britain
- Irish indentured servants
- Penal transportation
- Irish slaves
- White slavery
