= State Patty's Day =

Social event at Pennsylvania State University

State Patty's Day is a student-led social gathering that acts as a Pennsylvania State University alternative to the traditional Saint Patrick's Day. It began on Friday, March 2, 2007, because Saint Patrick's Day fell during spring break, which would have left students unable to celebrate the holiday while at school and with friends. The first annual State Patty's Day (so named because the students replaced Saint with State in the name of the holiday) took place on March 2, 2007. Students began flocking the streets of downtown State College, and bars and restaurants in the area opened early to take advantage of the holiday.

In subsequent years State Patty's Day has been scheduled for the weekend after the Penn State IFC/Panhellenic Dance Marathon (known as THON), giving the event a standardized date. As of 2014, it has persisted as an annual event, attracting more tourism to downtown State College than Saint Patrick's Day itself.

== History ==
State Patty's Day made its debut in early 2007 after a handful of students created a Facebook group entitled "The Official Group to Move St. Patrick's Day." Their hope was to unify the student body in early celebration. With an excess of over 4,600 members in 2008, along with an effort to get bars in downtown State College involved, the group was successful in moving the holiday to Friday March 2, a day that has been dubbed as State Patty's Day. Currently, the State Patty's Day Event Page has grown to nearly 12,000 followers.

The holiday has grown to such an extent that it attracts a significant number of out-of-town visitors; in 2011, nearly 60% of day's 234 arrests were for visitors. In 2012, the number reported was just under 20%.

Magisterial District Judge Carmine Prestia, who serves as president of the Centre County magisterial district judges, has instituted a policy whereby alternative adjudications, resulting in dismissal of summary offense charges, are not available for offenses occurring during State Patty's Day weekend. The effort was made in an attempt to discourage illegal activities and to try to make the event seem less appealing to out-of-town attendees.

Pennsylvania State University attempted to curb the holiday by paying local businesses to close starting in 2013. Initially, the university offered a flat $5,000 to any downtown business that agreed to either prohibit the sale of alcohol or close on the holiday. Penn State used parking revenue collected during previous State Patty’s Day celebrations dating back to 2007. The University paid $211,250 to 34 downtown businesses and $25,000 to five area beer distributors in 2014. The businesses were offered between $2,500 to $7,500 and paid out based on how many patrons each location could accommodate.

The previous two years, State College Borough had issued a "State Patty's Day After Action Report" outlining the financial impact of the event.

== Mixed local feedback ==
Initially, bars in downtown State College opened early and welcomed revelers; however, each year has seen a decrease in the number of bars willing to stay open, as local governance has asked them to cut back due to the nuisance it creates on town resources and local law enforcement.

The holiday sees a significant spike in law-enforcement incidents, a trend that has slightly abated. Starting in 2012, the holiday was banned among campus fraternities and sororities.

In February 2013, just weeks before the event, a committee of university, community, and student leaders created an agreement with three dozen restaurant and beer shops in the area to halt alcohol sales during the drinking holiday. In exchange each business was to receive a $5,000 subsidy to account for lost revenue. Many bar owners had voiced criticism that they had felt "extreme pressure" to close their doors and accept the terms of the deal. Although the subsidy was intended to off-set the financial loss as a result of the closures, the loss of revenue for the employees of the establishments went unaddressed, leaving upwards of 200 bar and restaurant employees without work on what would otherwise be a busy and lucrative Saturday night.

In an apparent lack of support, the State College Tavern Owners Association preemptively elected to reject any proposals made from the University or Borough of State College for the 2014 incarnation of State Patty's Day that would close their businesses. Accordingly, at the UPUA meeting on Jan. 22nd, the motions that were proposed to adopt the University's stance on State Patty's day were amended to reflect the lack of unity on the subject.

== See also ==
- Unofficial Saint Patrick's Day
