= Coatbridge Irish =

Irish community in Coatbridge, Scotland

Coatbridge is an urban town located on the eastern fringes of Glasgow, Scotland. The town quickly expanded during the late-eighteenth century as a centre of iron making, in part because it had a direct canal link to Glasgow. Cheap unskilled labour was in large demand and as result, the town became a very popular destination for vast numbers of people arriving in Scotland during this period.

== History of the Irish community in Coatbridge ==
The Irish first began arriving in Coatbridge in the early-nineteenth century. During this period, there was great tension between the new immigrants and the native miners. The 1851 UK Census notes that the Irish-born population in Coatbridge made up a total of 35.8% of the population. However, it should be acknowledged that a significant proportion of these emigrants would have been Protestant. Sectarian strife was a feature of the nineteenth century Coatbridge. In 1857, there were reports of riots between local Catholics and Protestants. The New York Times reported on serious "riots" between local Catholics and Orangemen which occurred during 1883.

According to James Handley, by 1901, the percentage of Irish-born in Coatbridge had fallen to around 15%, but remained the highest of all the major towns in Scotland. Handley's figures excluded the offspring of Irish-born immigrants and Handley argues that taking into consideration the culturally higher birth rates of Irish Catholic families at this time; the true figure of Irish population in Coatbridge at this time was in fact much greater.

In the late-nineteenth century, the largest and most generous Irish Home Rule organisation in Britain was found in Coatbridge.

Nineteenth century writers Andrew Miller and the Coatbridge poet, Janet Hamilton both refer to the Irish in Coatbridge. Modern-day writer Des Dillon also writes at length about the descendants of the nineteenth-century Irish immigrants in present-day Coatbridge.

The formation of Whifflet Shamrock in 1888 suggests an attempt to set up a football team to represent the Coatbridge community. The now defunct Patrick Sarsfield Hurling Club was set up in 1902 with the Éire Óg club conceived a few years later. Éire Óg went on to win the league title in 1909. Owen Roe O'Neill Gaelic Football Club was founded in the town in 1912.

In 1919, three branches of Sinn Féin were in existence. There was also a Gaelic League branch (Canon O'Keefe branch) in the town in 1901. At the 1950 general election, TP O'Callaghan stood as the candidate for the Irish Anti-Partition League. However, he finished in last place out of three candidates and was not elected. There is also quite a large Orange heritage in Coatbridge, with Men's and Women's Lodges and various flute bands including; Lily Of The Valley and Prince of Orange.

General estimates that at least 60% of the population of Coatbridge have an Irish Catholic background are based upon census figures, factors such as high number of Catholic church parishes in the town (nine) and the fact that there are currently two Catholic secondary schools and one "non-denominational" school. Religious statistics gathered in the 2001 UK Census are not available on the census website due to 'risk' and the statistics being deemed 'sensitive data', but Catholicism was recorded at just over 50%.

== Current Irish immigration to Coatbridge ==
The 2001 census recorded that currently less than 4% of the population of Coatbridge are Irish-born.

== Current culture and sport ==
The Irish in Coatbridge have been a significant influence on the town's social, political and cultural life. In recent years there has been increased interest in the Irish cultural heritage of the town. Evidence of this can be seen in the St Patrick's 10-day-long festival (sponsored by the Irish government) and visits from members of the Irish government such as president Mary McAleese. On her last visit Mary McAleese described Coatbridge as the 'heart of Ireland in Scotland'. Currently there are four Irish dance schools in the area, regular Irish classes, a Gaelic football team (Sands MacSwiney, formed 1986) and an Irish Genealogy Project. St Patrick's Church is situated on the Main Street of Coatbridge and forms a hub of Irish activity in town hosting regular Irish quiz nights and shows of Irish themed films.

In 2006, Coatbridge (along with Port Glasgow and Clydebank) was voted 'the least Scottish town in Scotland' due to having the highest percentage of Irish names in the country. Reportedly more than 28% of adults in Coatbridge had names with Irish origins. Ironically, Barra, the most Scottish place in Scotland is overwhelmingly Catholic compared to Coatbridge's slight majority. In 2008 Coatbridge was subject of an hour-long RTÉ documentary regarding the Irish culture of the town.

Perhaps the most obvious link with between Coatbridge and Ireland are the numerous Celtic F.C. supporters' clubs operating in the area. Phil Coles' Celtic supporters' club holds a legendary place in the folklore of Coatbridge Celtic supporters. Coatbridge is noted as a particular hotbed of Celtic support. A number of locals have also played professionally for the club including Gerry Creaney, Peter Grant, John McNamee and European cup medal winner, John 'Yogi' Hughes.

=== St. Patrick's Day festival ===
The Saint Patrick's Day Festival in Coatbridge commenced in 2003 with a single event and has run every year since. The festival has grown and, by 2007, it included an art exhibition, theatre, sports, music, film, street festival and dance events. The festival now runs for 10 days and each year the day-long Saturday street-party in Main Street with Irish music and Irish dancing is the festival highlight. In 2006, 9,000 people took part in the festival.

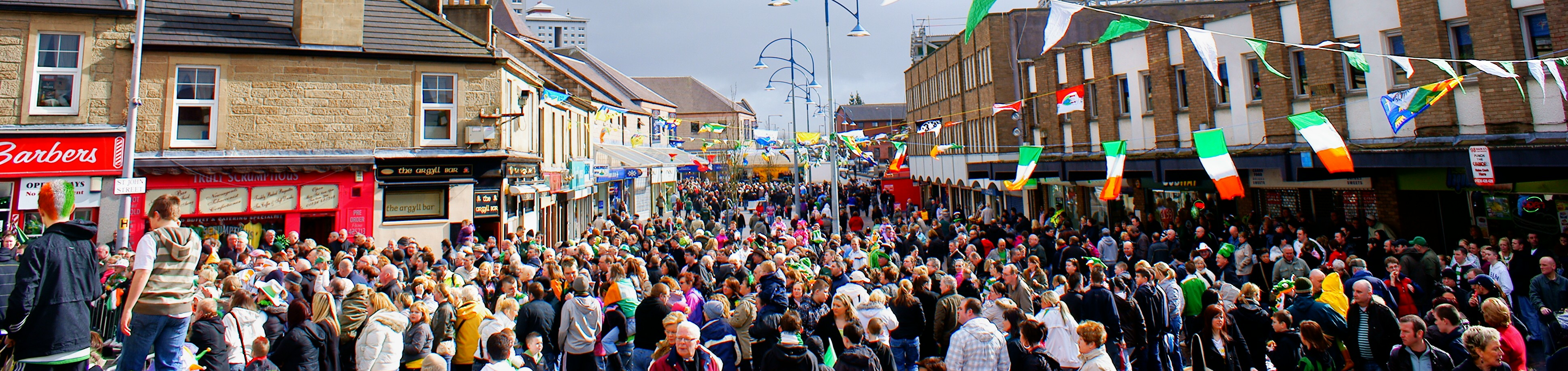
St. Patrick's Day Festival Saturday in Coatbridge 2009.

Guinness Diageo and the Irish government both sponsor the event. Irish President Mary McAleese visited Coatbridge in 2007. In 2006, Des Dillon's anti-sectarian play "Singin' I'm no a Billy he's a Tim" was performed at St Bartholomew's Church hall.

== Coatbridge accent ==
In 'Celtic minded', Des Dillon wrote about the notion of a separate Coatbridge accent influenced by the successive waves of Irish immigrants into the town. The Coatbridge accent has been categorised as generally less usage of the Scots tongue and the tendency to stress the 'a' vowel differently, e.g. stair (sterr), hair (herr), fair (ferr) etc. and this is attributed to the impact of successive influxes of Irish immigrants, particularly from Ulster. Another notable language trait reminiscent of Hiberno-English that is practiced commonly in Coatbridge is the use of the 'reaffirmative' after a sentence, e.g. "I need to go up the street tomorrow so I do," or "Tommy Tango's is always open so it is". This use of the re-affirmative is still common although, due to intermingling of the population, the Coatbridge accent is no longer so distinct from the neighbouring Glasgow accent.

== Notable people ==
Notable residents representing the links between Ireland and Coatbridge have included Margaret Skinnider (1893–1971), a Coatbridge teacher who fought in the Irish 1916 Easter Rising, acting variously as scout and sniper before being wounded in action. She went on to become paymaster-general of the Irish Republican Army. Dr. Charles O'Neill from Coatbridge represented South Armagh as the member of parliament. Eddie McAteer who was born in Coatbridge was perhaps the most important nationalist political figure in pre-troubles Northern Ireland. Danny Hegan, born in Coatbridge, played international football for Northern Ireland.
