= Unofficial Saint Patrick's Day =

Saint Patrick's Day celebration

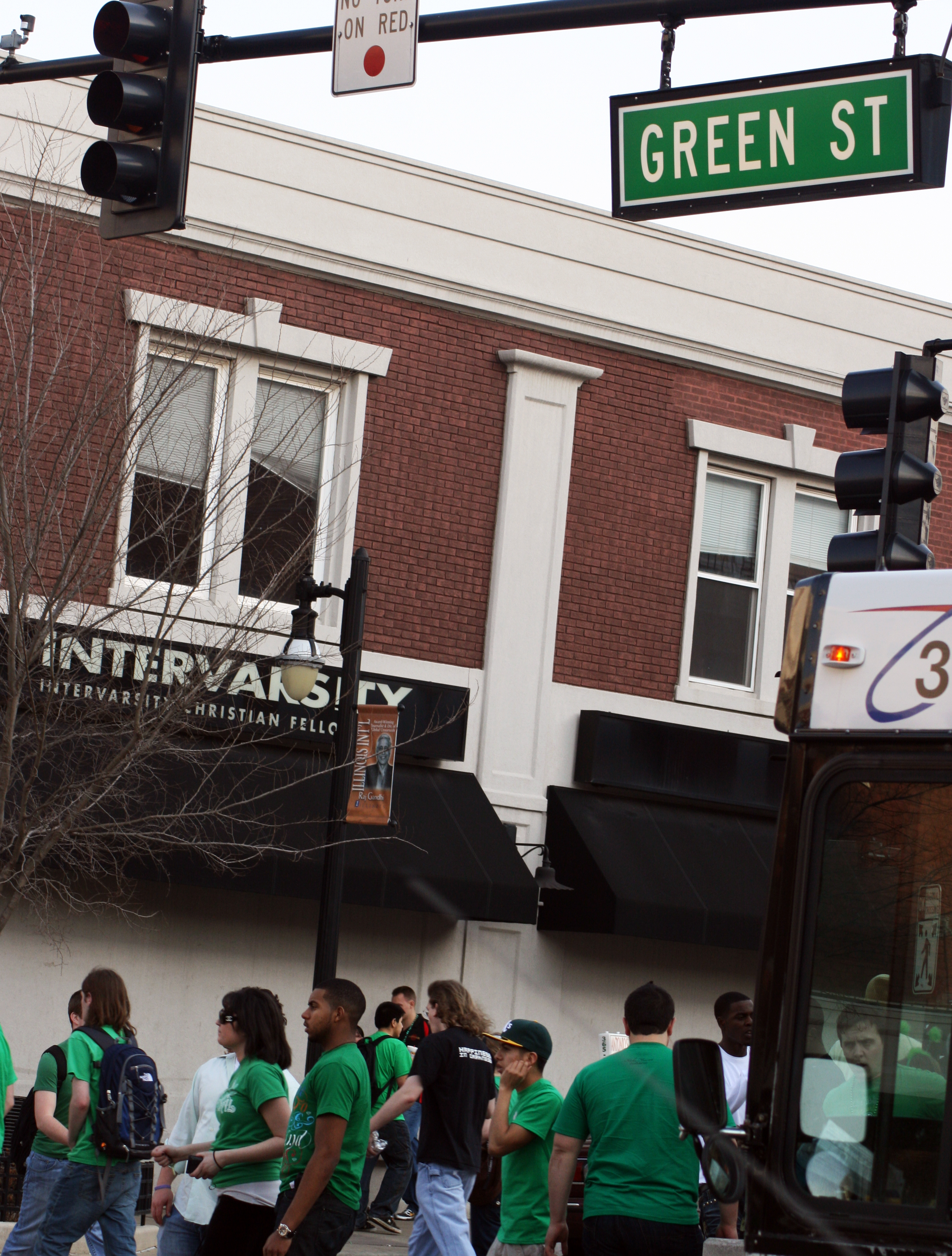
- Students dressed in green for Unofficial, on Green Street in Champaign, 2009
- Also called: Unofficial
- Observed by: University of Illinois Urbana-Champaign
- Type: Local
- Celebrations: Binge drinking
- Date: First Friday in March
- 2025 date: March 7
- 2026 date: March 6
- 2027 date: March 5
- 2028 date: March 3
- Duration: 2 days
- Frequency: Annual
- Related to: Saint Patrick's Day

Unofficial Saint Patrick's Day, commonly known as Unofficial, is an annual holiday at the University of Illinois Urbana-Champaign. It is celebrated by students starting on the first Friday of March, with celebrations continuing throughout the weekend, as an alternative to Saint Patrick's Day, which has historically fallen during the university's spring break.

The holiday has become a "destination event", with alumni and visitors from other universities joining students in celebration. Participants typically wear green clothing, attend parties, and engage in binge drinking, often beginning early in the morning. Not officially sanctioned by the university, Unofficial has received criticism by the university and local government after leading to several fatalities.

== History ==
The first event resembling Unofficial took place in March 1995, when Saint Patrick's Day at University of Illinois Urbana-Champaign was scheduled during spring break. To avoid losing profits, ten bars in Champaign's Campustown, including several owned by Scott Cochrane, held a Saint Patrick's Day-themed event called "Shamrock Stagger" on March 8, 1995, two days before the university's spring break. Shamrock Stagger was promoted as the university's "official Saint Patrick's Day party", despite not being officially endorsed by the university.

The following year, in 1996, presumably after pushback from the university, events held at Cochrane-owned Campustown bars the week before spring break were advertised as "Unofficial Saint Patrick's Day" for the first time. In 1997, Unofficial Saint Patrick's Day was moved to the Friday eight days before spring break, and it has since fallen on the first Friday of March each year.

Cochrane, who is credited with creating the holiday, acquired a service mark and later a trademark on the name "Unofficial". In 2016, the "Unofficial" trademark was sold to apparel company UpMerch, with a licensing agreement allowing two other companies to use the name on merchandise.

According to University of Illinois Police Communications Director Patrick Wade, Unofficial reached its peak sometime between 2006 and 2011, with interest somewhat dwindling since then. During the event in 2011, Champaign police officers issued 364 court notices to students, compared to only 12 issued in 2020 in what Champaign Police Sergeant Greg Manzana called "essentially a non-event". In 2021, amid the COVID-19 pandemic, Cochrane declared "Unofficial is dead", citing the local government and university's opposition to the holiday, but some student celebrations still took place.

== Incidents ==
Due to the chaotic nature of the event, Unofficial has led to several incidents, including at least three deaths. In 2006, 22-year-old Caroline Yoon died from injuries after falling off a motorcycle. In 2011, 21-year-old Brad Bunte died from injuries after being struck by two cars on University Avenue.

In 2017, 23-year-old university student Jonathan Morales, a junior majoring in communications from Franklin Park, Illinois, fell over the railing of a fourth-floor balcony during an Unofficial party. He was taken to Carle Foundation Hospital, where he was pronounced dead later that night. Toxicology tests later confirmed that Morales had been drinking. In response, the university chancellor Robert J. Jones issued a statement mourning Morales's death and calling for an end to Unofficial.

Other negative consequences of Unofficial have included vandalism of university bathrooms, disruption of classes, an uptick in parking violations on campus, and a significant increase in tickets and arrests, especially for underage drinking and drunk driving.

== Response ==
Campustown sees heightened police presence during Unofficial, including officers representing the university, the cities of Urbana and Champaign, and the state of Illinois. Champaign has also imposed limits on packaged alcohol sales at campus bars and convenience stores during the event. The university has repeatedly condemned the event, routinely sending a letter to parents and a mass email to students discouraging participation. The university has also banned overnight guests in residence halls and prohibited fraternity and sorority parties during the weekend.

== See also ==
- State Patty's Day
