= Des Dillon (writer) =

Scottish writer

- Born: Derrick Daniel Dillon; 8 June 1960 (age 66); Coatbridge, Scotland
- Occupations: Novelist, screenwriter, dramatist, poet
- Children: 5
- Writing career
- Genres: Fiction, poetry, drama
- Notable works: Me And Ma Gal (1995), Six Black Candles (2002), Singin' I'm No A Billy He's A Tim (2005) My Epileptic Lurcher (2008)

Derrick Daniel Dillon (born 8 June 1960) is a Scottish writer. He was Writer-in-Residence at Castlemilk from 1998-2000. He is a poet, short story writer, novelist, dramatist, broadcaster, screenwriter, and scriptwriter for TV, stage and radio. His books have been published in the US, India, Russia, Sweden, in Catalan, French and Spanish. His poetry has been anthologised internationally.

== Early years ==
He was born in Coatbridge and studied English literature at Strathclyde University before becoming a teacher.

== Career ==
His novel Me and Ma Gal (1995), chronicles a day in the lives of two best friends, Derek and Gal, set against the Coatbridge landscape of slagpits and steelworks, and was shortlisted for the Saltire Society Scottish First Book of the Year Award, was included in The 100 Greatest Ever Scottish Books and won the World Book Day ‘We Are What We Read’ poll for the novel that best describes Scotland today.

In Six Black Candles (2002) (a novel originally written as a play for Birds of Paradise Theatre Company in 1999) the heroine Caroline, who has been deserted by her wayward husband Bobby, finds her sisters embarking on a ritualistic revenge, centered on the six black candles of the title.

Des Dillon's play, Singin I'm No a Billy He's a Tim gained critical acclaim at the Edinburgh Fringe Festival in 2005 and toured Scotland and Ireland in 2007. Monks (2006) was originally published as The Big Q (2001) and was adapted into play which enjoyed its world premiere in the Royal Lyceum, Edinburgh in 2007.

My Epileptic Lurcher (2008) is the story of Manny Riley, a recovering alcoholic and struggling scriptwriter with a serious anger management problem, and his newly adopted lurcher, Bailey, who has epilepsy. The book is loosely based on Des Dillon's own life, and his lurcher (also called Bailey) who has epilepsy.

== Awards and honors ==
His latest award was The Lion and Unicorn prize for the best of Irish and British literature in the Russian Language (2007).

== Personal life ==
Des lives in Galloway with his wife and dogs.

== Published work ==
- Sniz Bloody Write, 1994
- Me and Ma Gal Argyll Publishing, 1995
- The Big Empty: A Collection of Short Stories, Argyll Publishing, 1997
- Duck Argyll Publishing, 1998
- Itchycooblue Headline Review, 1999
- Return of the Busby Babes Headline Review, 2000
- New Writing 10 (contributor) Picador in Association with the British Council, 2001
- The Big Q Headline Review, 2001
- Six Black Candles Headline, 2002
- Picking Brambles Luath Press, 2003
- The Glasgow Dragon Luath Press, 2004
- The Blue Hen Novella Sandstone Press, 2004
- Singin I'm No a Billy He's a Tim Luath Press, 2005
- They Scream When You Kill Them Luath Press, 2006
- Monks, Luath Press, 2007
- My Epileptic Lurcher, Luath Press, 2008
- An Experiment in Compassion, Luath Press, 2011
- Yalena;s Leningrad, Kindle, 2013
