= Saint Patrick's Day =

Cultural and religious celebration on 17 March

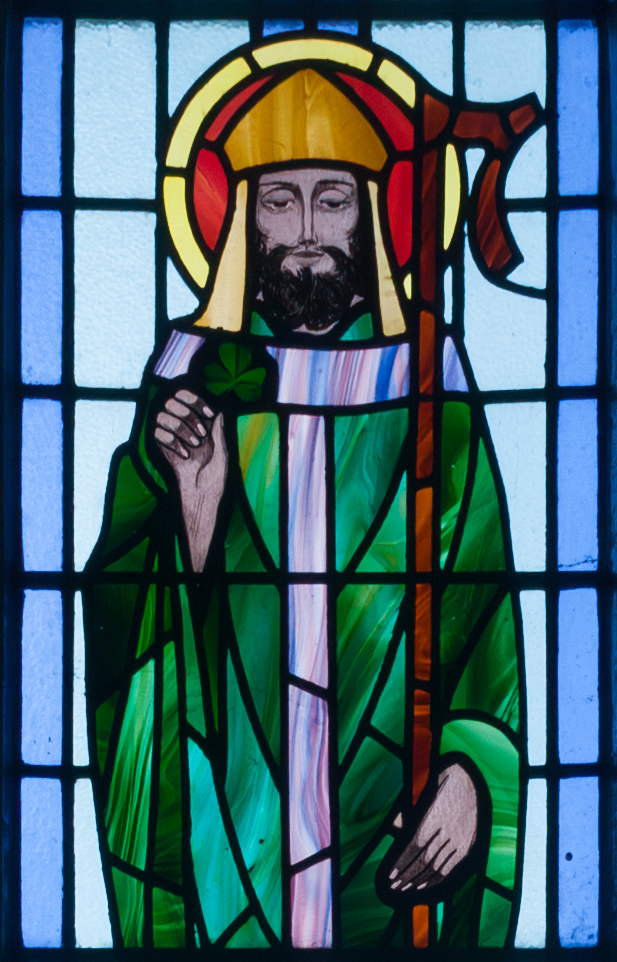
- Saint Patrick depicted in a stained-glass window at Saint Benin's Church in Kilbennen, near Tuam, in County Galway, Ireland
- Official name: Saint Patrick's Day
- Also called: Feast of Saint Patrick; Lá Fhéile Pádraig; Patrick's Day; (St.) Paddy's Day; (St.) Patty's Day (mainly North America)
- Observed by: Irish people and people of Irish descent; Catholic Church (see calendar); Anglican Communion (see calendars); Eastern Orthodox Church (see calendar); Lutheran Church (see calendar)
- Type: Ethnic, national, Christian
- Significance: Feast day of Saint Patrick, commemoration of the arrival of Christianity in Ireland
- Celebrations: Attending parades and a céilí; Wearing green and shamrocks; Eating Irish food; Drinking Irish beer and Irish whiskey
- Observances: Christian processions; attending Mass or service
- Date: 17 March
- Frequency: Annual

Saint Patrick's Day, or the Feast of Saint Patrick (Irish: Lá Fhéile Pádraig, lit. 'the Day of the Festival of Patrick'), is a religious and cultural holiday held on 17 March, the traditional death date of Saint Patrick (c. 385 – c. 461), the foremost patron saint of Ireland.

Saint Patrick's Day was made an official Christian feast day in the early 17th century and is observed by the Catholic Church, the Anglican Communion (especially the Church of Ireland), the Eastern Orthodox Church, and the Lutheran Church. The day commemorates Saint Patrick and the arrival of Christianity in Ireland, and, by extension, celebrates the heritage and culture of the Irish in general. Celebrations generally involve public parades and festivals, céilithe, and the wearing of green attire or shamrocks. Christians who belong to liturgical denominations also attend church services. Historically, the Lenten restrictions on fasting and drinking alcohol were lifted for the day, which has encouraged the holiday's tradition of revelry.

Saint Patrick's Day is a public holiday in the Republic of Ireland, Northern Ireland, the Canadian province of Newfoundland and Labrador (for provincial government employees), and the British Overseas Territory of Montserrat. It is also widely celebrated in places with a large Irish diaspora community, such as Great Britain, Canada, the United States, Australia, New Zealand, and South Africa. Saint Patrick's Day is celebrated in more countries than any other national festival. Modern celebrations have been greatly influenced by those of the Irish diaspora, particularly those that developed in North America. However, there has been criticism of Saint Patrick's Day celebrations for having become too commercialised, for their connections to drinking culture, and for fostering negative stereotypes of the Irish people.

== Saint Patrick ==
Saint Patrick was a 5th-century Christian missionary and bishop in Ireland. Much of what is known about Saint Patrick comes from the Declaration, which was allegedly written by Patrick himself. It is believed that he was born in Roman Britain in the fourth century, into a wealthy Romano-British family. His father was a Christian deacon and his grandfather a priest. According to the Declaration, at the age of sixteen, he was kidnapped by Irish raiders and taken as a slave to Gaelic Ireland. It says that he spent six years there working as a shepherd and that during this time he found God. The Declaration says that God told Patrick to flee to the coast, where a ship would be waiting to take him home. After making his way home, Patrick went on to become a priest.

According to tradition, Patrick returned to Ireland to convert the pagan Irish to Christianity. The Declaration says that he spent many years evangelising in the northern half of Ireland and converted thousands.

Tradition holds that he died on 17 March and was buried at Downpatrick. Over the following centuries, many legends grew up around Patrick and he became Ireland's foremost saint.

== Celebration and traditions ==
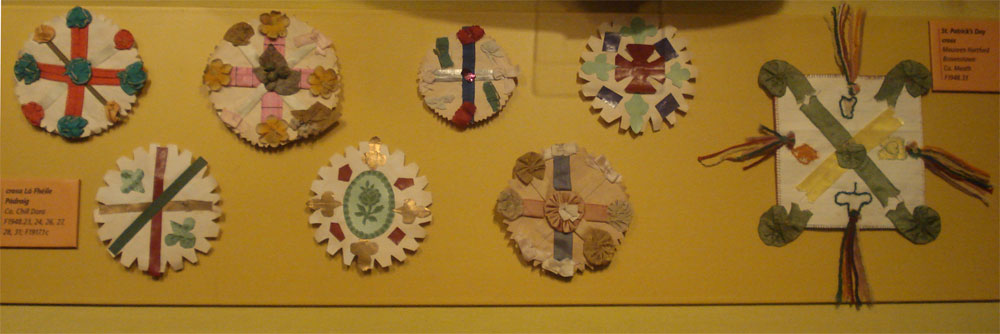
Traditional Saint Patrick's Day badges from the early 20th century, Museum of Country Life in County Mayo

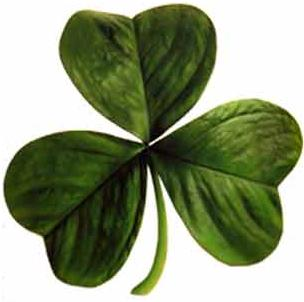
According to legend, Saint Patrick used the three-leaved shamrock to explain the Holy Trinity to Irish pagans.

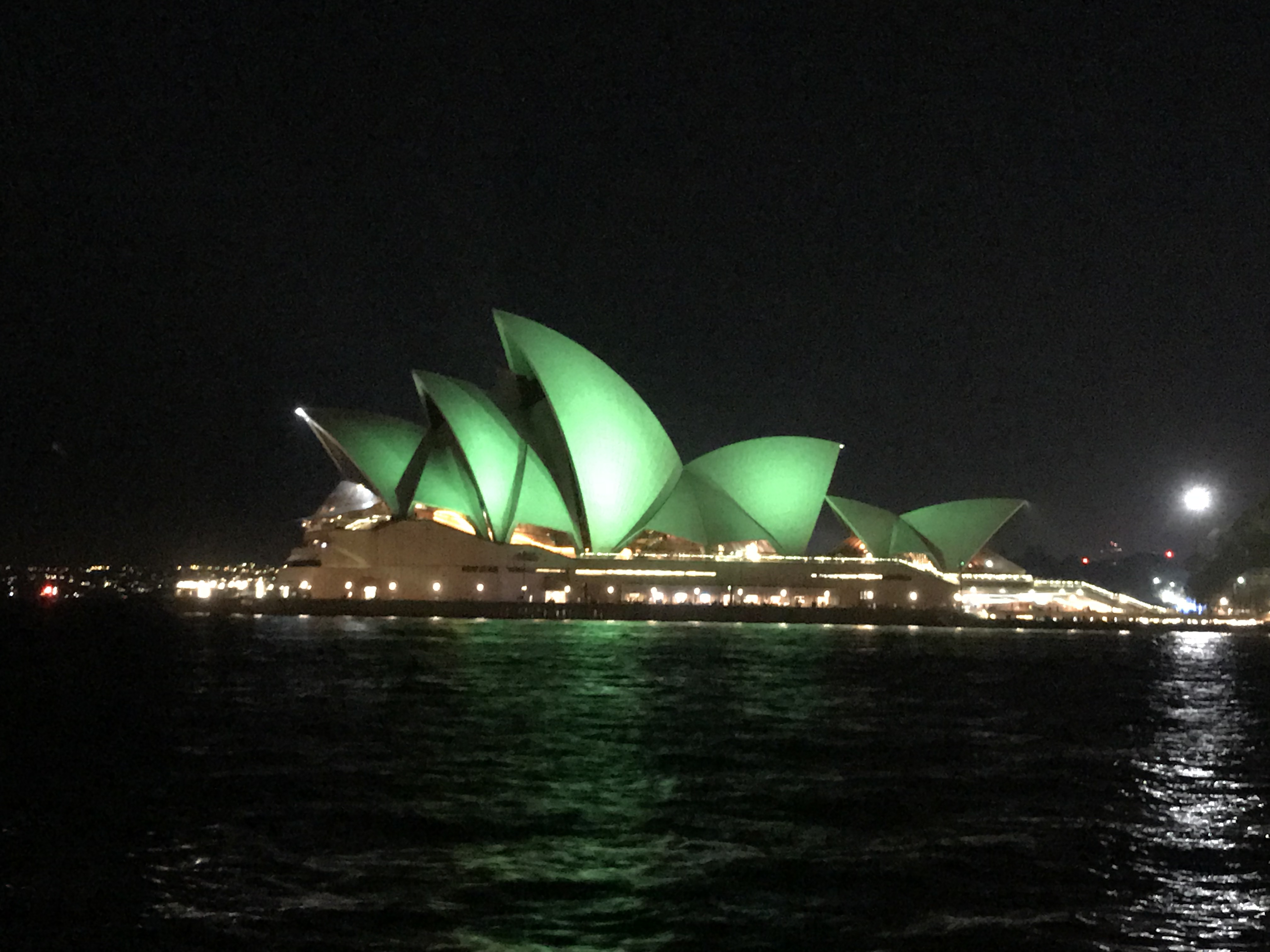
Sydney Opera House lit up green in honour of Saint Patrick in Sydney, Australia

Present day Saint Patrick's Day celebrations have been greatly influenced by those that developed among the Irish diaspora, especially in North America. Until the late 20th century, Saint Patrick's Day was often a bigger celebration among the diaspora than it was in Ireland.

Celebrations generally involve public parades and festivals, Irish traditional music sessions (céilithe), and the wearing of green attire or shamrocks. There are also formal gatherings such as banquets and dances, although these were more common in the past. Saint Patrick's Day parades began in North America in the 18th century but did not spread to Ireland until the 20th century. The participants generally include marching bands, the military, fire brigades, cultural organisations, charitable organisations, voluntary associations, youth groups, fraternities, and so on. However, over time, many of the parades have become more akin to a carnival. More effort is made to use the Irish language, especially in Ireland, where 1 March to St Patrick's Day on 17 March is Seachtain na Gaeilge ("Irish language week").

Since 2010, famous landmarks have been lit up in green on Saint Patrick's Day as part of Tourism Ireland's "Global Greening Initiative" or "Going Green for St Patrick's Day". The Sydney Opera House and the Sky Tower in Auckland were the first landmarks to participate and since then over 300 landmarks in fifty countries across the globe have gone green for Saint Patrick's Day.

Many Irish people also attend church services with their families, and the Lenten restrictions on eating and drinking alcohol are lifted for the day. Perhaps because of this, drinking alcohol – particularly Irish whiskey, beer, or cider – has become an integral part of the celebrations. In Ireland, this relaxation of fasting rules is notably marked by the consumption of stout, a dark ale beer that is a key part of the celebration, with breweries preparing months in advance for the demand. The Saint Patrick's Day custom of "drowning the shamrock" or "wetting the shamrock" was historically popular. At the end of the celebrations, especially in Ireland, a shamrock is put into the bottom of a cup, which is then filled with whiskey, beer, or cider. It is then drunk as a toast to Saint Patrick, Ireland, or those present. The shamrock would either be swallowed with the drink or taken out and tossed over the shoulder for good luck.

Irish Government ministers travel abroad on official visits to various countries around Saint Patrick's Day to promote Ireland.

=== Wearing green and shamrocks ===
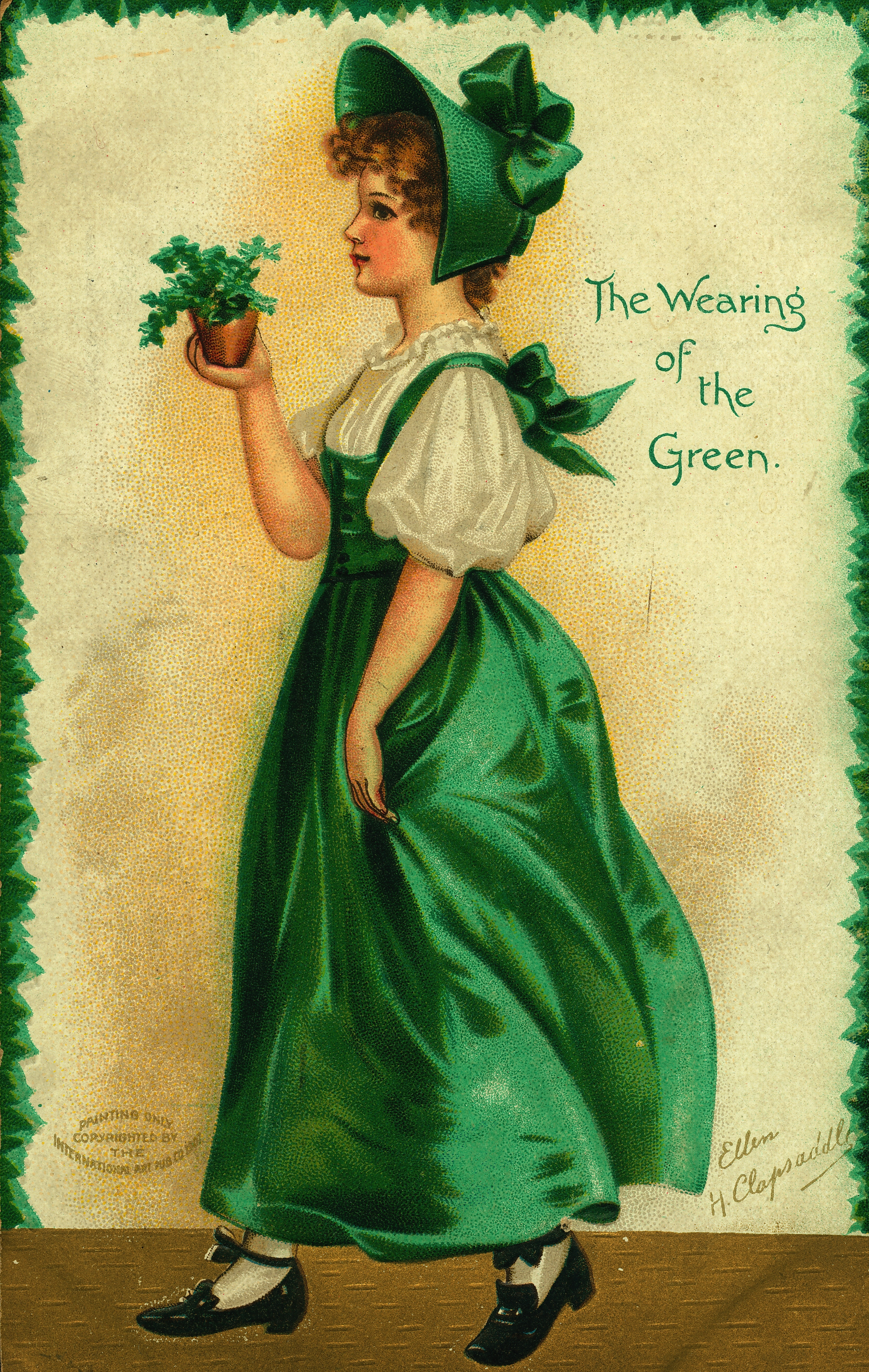
A Saint Patrick's Day greeting card from 1907

On Saint Patrick's Day, it is customary to wear shamrocks, green clothing, or green accessories. Saint Patrick is said to have used the shamrock, a three-leaved plant, to explain the Holy Trinity to the pagan Irish. This story first appears in writing in 1726, though it may be older. In pagan Ireland, three was a significant number and the Irish had many triple deities, which may have aided St Patrick in his evangelisation efforts. Roger Homan writes, "We can perhaps see St Patrick drawing upon the visual concept of the triskele when he uses the shamrock to explain the Trinity". Patricia Monaghan says there is no evidence the shamrock was sacred to the pagan Irish. Jack Santino speculates that it may have represented the regenerative powers of nature, and was recast in a Christian context‍—‌icons of Saint Patrick often depict the saint "with a cross in one hand and a sprig of shamrocks in the other".

The first association of the colour green with Ireland is from a legend in the 11th century Lebor Gabála Érenn (The Book of the Taking of Ireland). It tells of Goídel Glas (Goídel the green), the eponymous ancestor of the Gaels and creator of the Goidelic languages (Irish, Scottish Gaelic, Manx). Goídel is bitten by a venomous snake but saved from death by Moses placing his staff on the snakebite, leaving him with a green mark. His descendants settle in Ireland, a land free of snakes. One of the first, Íth, visits Ireland after climbing the Tower of Hercules and being captivated by the sight of a beautiful green island in the distance.

The colour green was further associated with Ireland from the 1640s, when the green harp flag was used by the Irish Catholic Confederation. Later, James Connolly described this flag as representing "the sacred emblem of Ireland's unconquered soul". Green ribbons and shamrocks have been worn on Saint Patrick's Day since at least the 1680s. Since then, the colour green and its association with St Patrick's Day have grown.

The Friendly Brothers of St Patrick, an Irish fraternity founded in about 1750, adopted green as its colour. The Order of St Patrick, an Anglo-Irish chivalric order founded in 1783, instead adopted blue as its colour, which led to blue being associated with Saint Patrick. In the 1790s, the colour green was adopted by the United Irishmen. This was a republican organisation—founded mostly by Protestants but with a mainly Catholic membership—who launched a rebellion in 1798 against British rule. Ireland was first called "the Emerald Isle" in "When Erin First Rose" (1795), a poem by a co-founder of the United Irishmen, William Drennan, which stresses the historical importance of green to the Irish. The phrase "wearing of the green" comes from a song of the same name about United Irishmen being persecuted for wearing green. The flags of the 1916 Easter Rising featured green, such as the Starry Plough banner and the Proclamation Flag of the Irish Republic. When the Irish Free State was founded in 1922, the government ordered all post boxes be painted green, with the slogan "green paint for a green people"; in 1924, the government introduced a green Irish passport.

The wearing of the 'St Patrick's Day Cross' was also a popular custom in Ireland until the early 20th century. These were a Celtic Christian cross made of paper that was "covered with silk or ribbon of different colours, and a bunch or rosette of green silk in the centre".

== In Ireland ==
=== History ===
Saint Patrick's feast day, as a kind of national day, was already being celebrated by the Irish in Europe in the ninth and tenth centuries. Saint Patrick's feast day was finally placed on the liturgical calendar of the Catholic Church in the early 1600s, due to the influence of Waterford-born Franciscan scholar Luke Wadding. Saint Patrick's Day thus became a holy day of obligation for Catholics in Ireland. It is also a feast day in the Church of Ireland, part of the Anglican Communion. The church calendar avoids the observance of saints' feasts during certain solemnities, moving the saint's day to a time outside those periods. Saint Patrick's Day is occasionally affected by this requirement, when 17 March falls during Holy Week. This happened in 1940, when Saint Patrick's Day was officially observed on 3 April to avoid it coinciding with Palm Sunday, and again in 2008, where it was officially observed on 15 March. Saint Patrick's Day will not fall within Holy Week again until 2160. However, the popular festivities may still be held on 17 March or on a weekend near to the feast day.

Saint Patrick's was perceived as the middle day of spring in the Irish calendar. People expected that weather would be improved following the festival, and farmers would begin planting potato.

=== Modern era ===
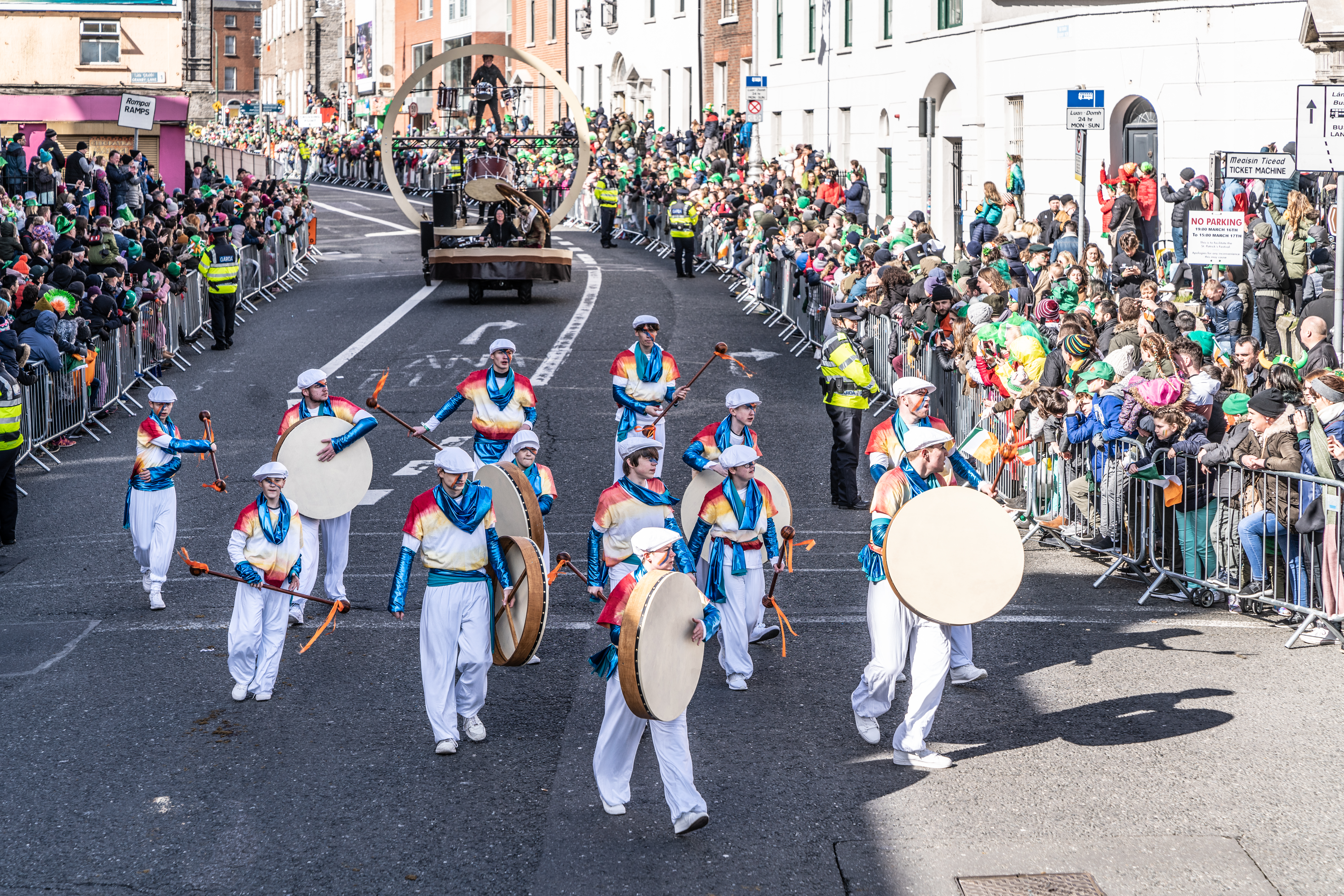
Buí Bolg at the St. Patrick's Day parade in Dublin

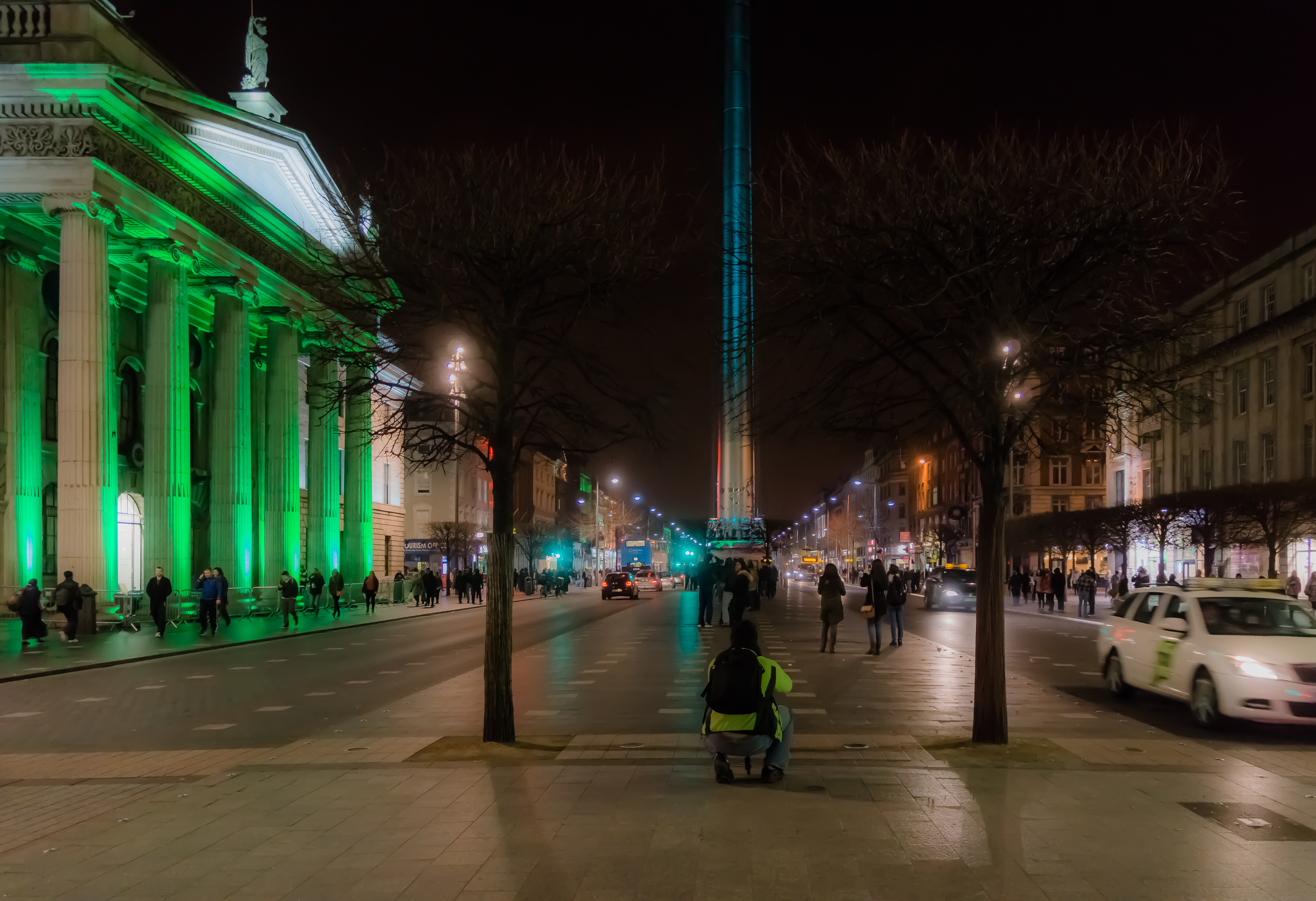
Dublin's General Post Office and the Spire on O'Connell Street on Saint Patrick's Day

In 1903, Saint Patrick's Day became an official public holiday in Ireland due to the Bank Holiday (Ireland) Act 1903, an Act of the Parliament of the United Kingdom introduced by James O'Mara, an MP from the Irish Parliamentary Party (IPP).

The first Saint Patrick's Day parade in Ireland was held in Waterford in 1903, hundreds of years after the first parade in North America. The week of Saint Patrick's Day 1903 had been declared Irish Language Week by the Gaelic League and in Waterford they opted to have a procession on Sunday 15 March. The procession comprised the Mayor and members of Waterford Corporation, the Trades Hall, the various trade unions and bands who included the 'Barrack St Band' and the 'Thomas Francis Meagher Band'. The parade began at the premises of the Gaelic League in George's St and finished in the Peoples Park, where the public were addressed by the Mayor and other dignitaries. On Tuesday 17 March, most Waterford businesses—including public houses—were closed and marching bands paraded as they had two days previously.

On Saint Patrick's Day 1916, the Irish Volunteers—an Irish nationalist paramilitary organisation—held parades throughout Ireland. The authorities recorded 38 St Patrick's Day parades, involving 6,000 marchers, almost half of whom were reported to be armed. The following month, the Irish Volunteers launched the Easter Rising against British rule. This marked the beginning of the Irish revolutionary period and led to the Irish War of Independence and Civil War. During this time, Saint Patrick's Day celebrations in Ireland were muted, although the day was sometimes chosen to hold large political rallies.

The celebrations remained low-key after the creation of the Irish Free State in 1922; the only state-organized observance was a military procession and trooping of the colours, and an Irish-language mass attended by government ministers. In 1927, the Irish Free State government banned the selling of alcohol on St Patrick's Day, although it remained legal in Northern Ireland. The ban was not repealed until 1961.

The first official, state-sponsored Saint Patrick's Day parade in Dublin took place in 1931. Public St Patrick's Day festivities in Ireland have been cancelled three times, all for public health reasons. In 2001, celebrations were postponed to May due to the foot-and-mouth outbreak, while in 2020 and 2021 they were cancelled outright due to the COVID-19 pandemic.

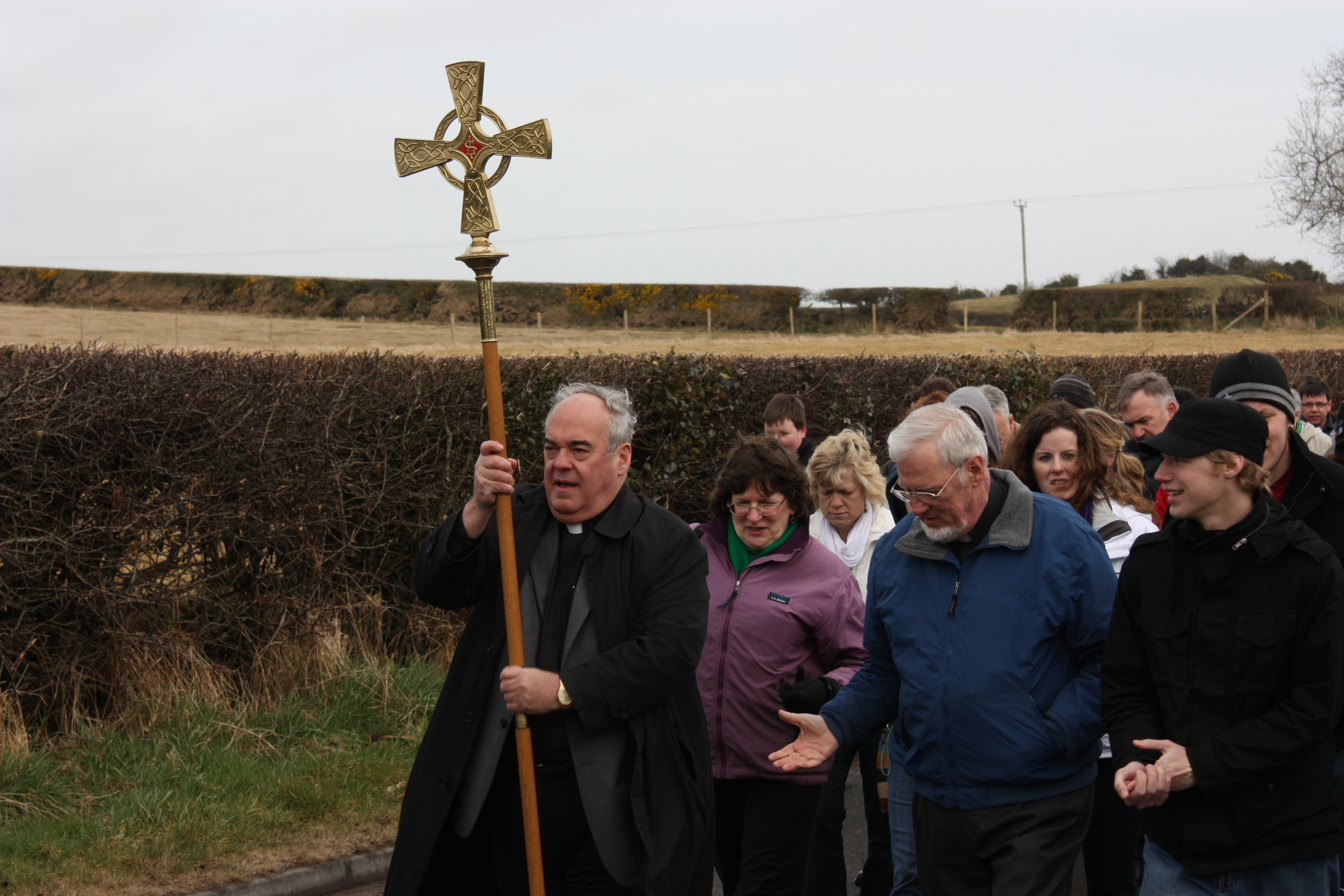
A Saint Patrick's Day Christian procession in Downpatrick, where Saint Patrick is said to be buried

In Ulster, especially within Northern Ireland and County Donegal (particularly East Donegal), the celebration of Saint Patrick's Day was affected by sectarian divisions. Up until the late twentieth century, a majority of the population in Ulster, the northern province in Ireland, were Protestant Ulster unionists who saw themselves primarily as British, while a substantial minority were Catholic Irish nationalists who saw themselves primarily as Irish. Although it was a public holiday, Northern Ireland's Unionist government did not officially observe St Patrick's Day. During the conflict in Northern Ireland known as the Troubles (late 1960s–late 1990s), public St Patrick's Day celebrations were rare and tended to be associated with the Catholic community. In 1976, loyalists detonated a car bomb outside a pub crowded with Catholics celebrating St Patrick's Day in Dungannon in the south-east of County Tyrone; four civilians were killed and many injured. However, some Protestant unionists attempted to 're-claim' the festival, and in 1985 the Orange Order held its own Saint Patrick's Day parade. Since the end of the conflict in 1998 there have been cross-community St Patrick's Day parades in towns throughout Northern Ireland, which have attracted thousands of spectators. In Belfast, Belfast City Hall flies the St Patrick's Saltire alongside the Union Jack on St Patrick's Day.

In the mid-1990s the government of the Republic of Ireland began a campaign to use Saint Patrick's Day to showcase Ireland and its culture. The government set up a group called St. Patrick's Festival, with the aims of creating a world-class national festival and "to project, internationally, an accurate image of Ireland as a creative, professional and sophisticated country with wide appeal". The first Saint Patrick's Festival was held on 17 March 1996. In 1997, it became a three-day event, and by 2006, the festival was five days long. More than 675,000 people attended the 2009 parade, and that year's festival saw almost 1 million visitors, who took part in festivities that included concerts, outdoor theatre performances, and fireworks. From 2006 to 2012 the Skyfest formed the centrepiece of the Saint Patrick's Festival.

The week around Saint Patrick's Day is Seachtain na Gaeilge ("Irish Language Week"), when more Irish language events are held and there is more effort to use the language.

Christian leaders in Ireland have expressed concern about the secularisation of Saint Patrick's Day. In The Word magazine's March 2007 issue, Fr Vincent Twomey wrote, "It is time to reclaim St Patrick's Day as a church festival". He questioned the need for "mindless alcohol-fuelled revelry" and concluded that "it is time to bring the piety and the fun together".

One of the biggest celebrations outside the cities is in Downpatrick, County Down, where Saint Patrick is said to be buried. The shortest Saint Patrick's Day parade in the world formerly took place in Dripsey, County Cork. The parade lasted just 23.4 metres and traveled between the village's two pubs. The tradition began in 1999, but ended after five years when one of the pubs closed. The current shortest Saint Paddy's Day parade has been held in Little Compton, Rhode Island, since 2022. The parade lasts only 89 feet. The title is disputed by Hot Springs, Arkansas, which has hosted the shortest St. Patrick's Day parade since 2004, measuring at 98 feet.

== Celebrations elsewhere ==
=== Europe ===
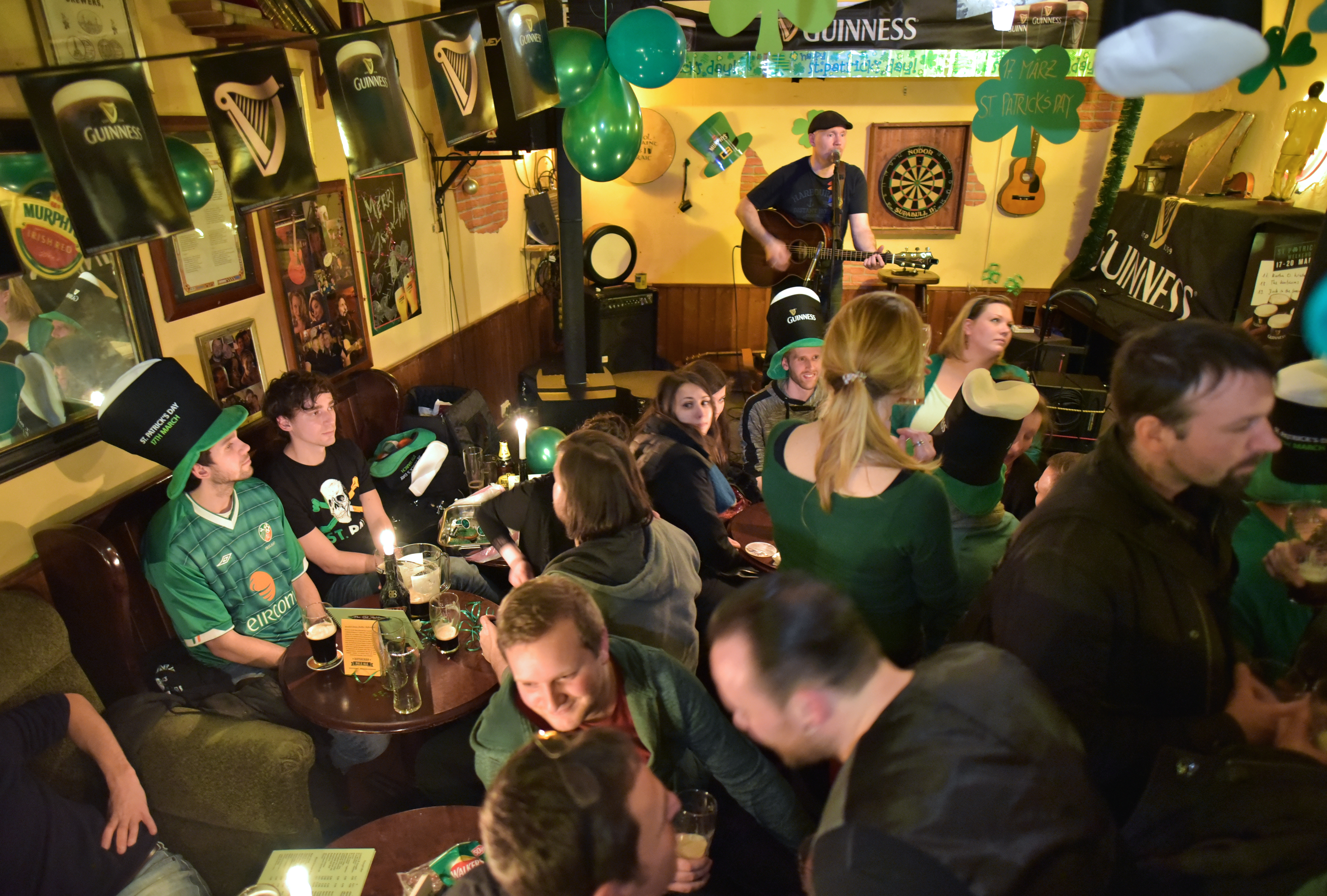
Saint Patrick's Day 2016 in an Irish pub in Hamburg, Germany

==== England ====
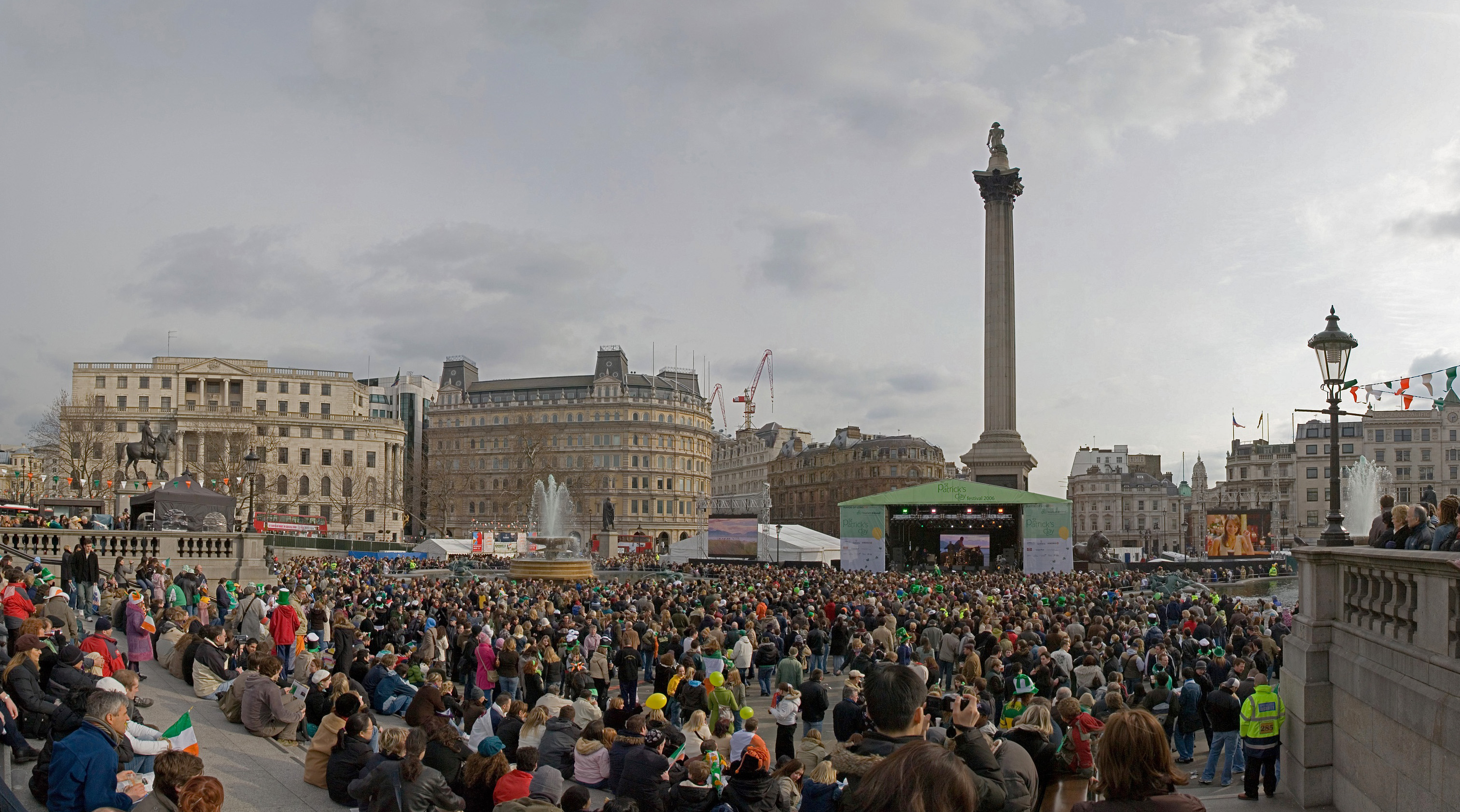
Saint Patrick's Day celebration at Trafalgar Square in London, 2006

In England, the Royal Colonel or Colonel-in-chief traditionally present bowls of shamrock to members of the Irish Guards, a regiment in the British Army, following Queen Alexandra introducing the tradition in 1901. Since 2012, Catherine, Princess of Wales has presented the bowls of shamrock to the Irish Guards. While female royals are often tasked with presenting the bowls of shamrock, male royals have also undertaken the role, such as King George VI in 1950 to mark the 50th anniversary of the formation of the Irish Guards, and in 2016 the Duke of Cambridge in place of his wife. Fresh Shamrocks are presented to the Irish Guards, regardless of where they are stationed, and are flown in from Ireland.

While some Saint Patrick's Day celebrations could be conducted openly in Britain pre 1960s, this would change following the commencement by the IRA's bombing campaign on mainland Britain and as a consequence this resulted in a suspicion of all things Irish and those who supported them which led to people of Irish descent wearing a sprig of shamrock on Saint Patrick's day in private or attending specific events. Today, after many years following the Good Friday Agreement, people of Irish descent openly wear a sprig of shamrock to celebrate their Irishness.

Christian denominations in Great Britain observing his feast day include the Church of England and the Roman Catholic Church.

Birmingham holds the largest Saint Patrick's Day parade in Britain with a city centre parade over a two-mile (3 km) route through the city centre. The organisers describe it as the third biggest parade in the world after Dublin and New York.

London, since 2002, has had an annual Saint Patrick's Day parade which takes place on weekends around the 17th, usually in Trafalgar Square. In 2008, the water in the Trafalgar Square fountains was dyed green. In 2020, the parade was cancelled due to the COVID-19 pandemic.

Liverpool has the highest proportion of residents with Irish ancestry of any English city. This has led to a long-standing celebration on Saint Patrick's Day in terms of music, cultural events and the parade.

Manchester hosts a two-week Irish festival in the weeks prior to Saint Patrick's Day. The festival includes an Irish Market based at the city's town hall which flies the Irish tricolour opposite the Union Flag, a large parade as well as a large number of cultural and learning events throughout the two-week period.

==== Scotland ====
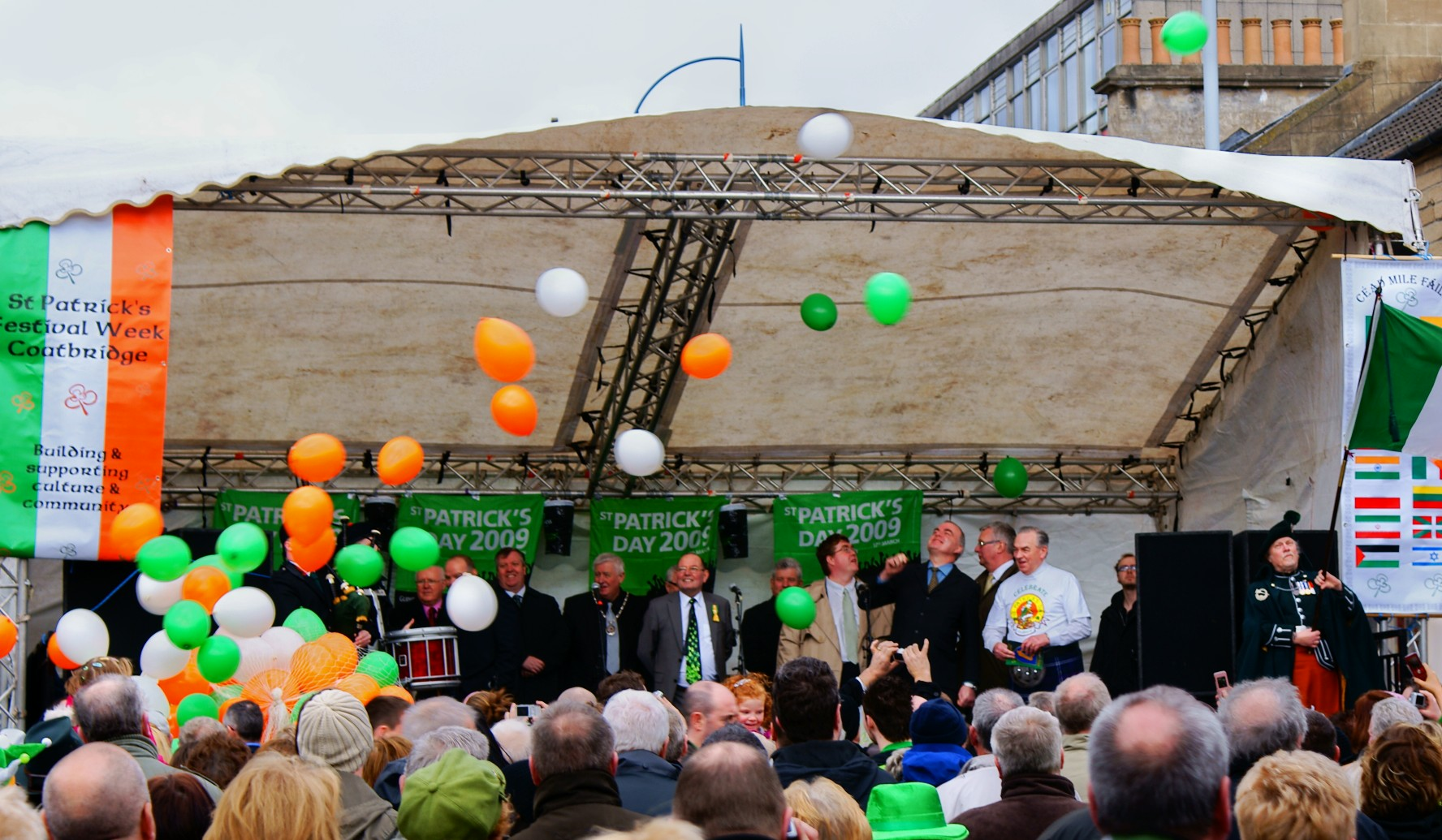
2009 Saint Patrick's Day festival celebration in Coatbridge, Scotland

The Scottish town of Coatbridge, where the majority of the town's population are of Irish descent, also has a Saint Patrick's Day Festival which includes celebrations and parades in the town centre.

Glasgow has a considerably large Irish population; due, for the most part, to the Irish immigration during the 19th century. This immigration was the main cause in raising the population of Glasgow by over 100,000 people. Due to this large Irish population, there are many Irish-themed pubs and Irish interest groups who hold yearly celebrations on Saint Patrick's day in Glasgow. Glasgow has held a yearly Saint Patrick's Day parade and festival since 2007.

==== Malta ====
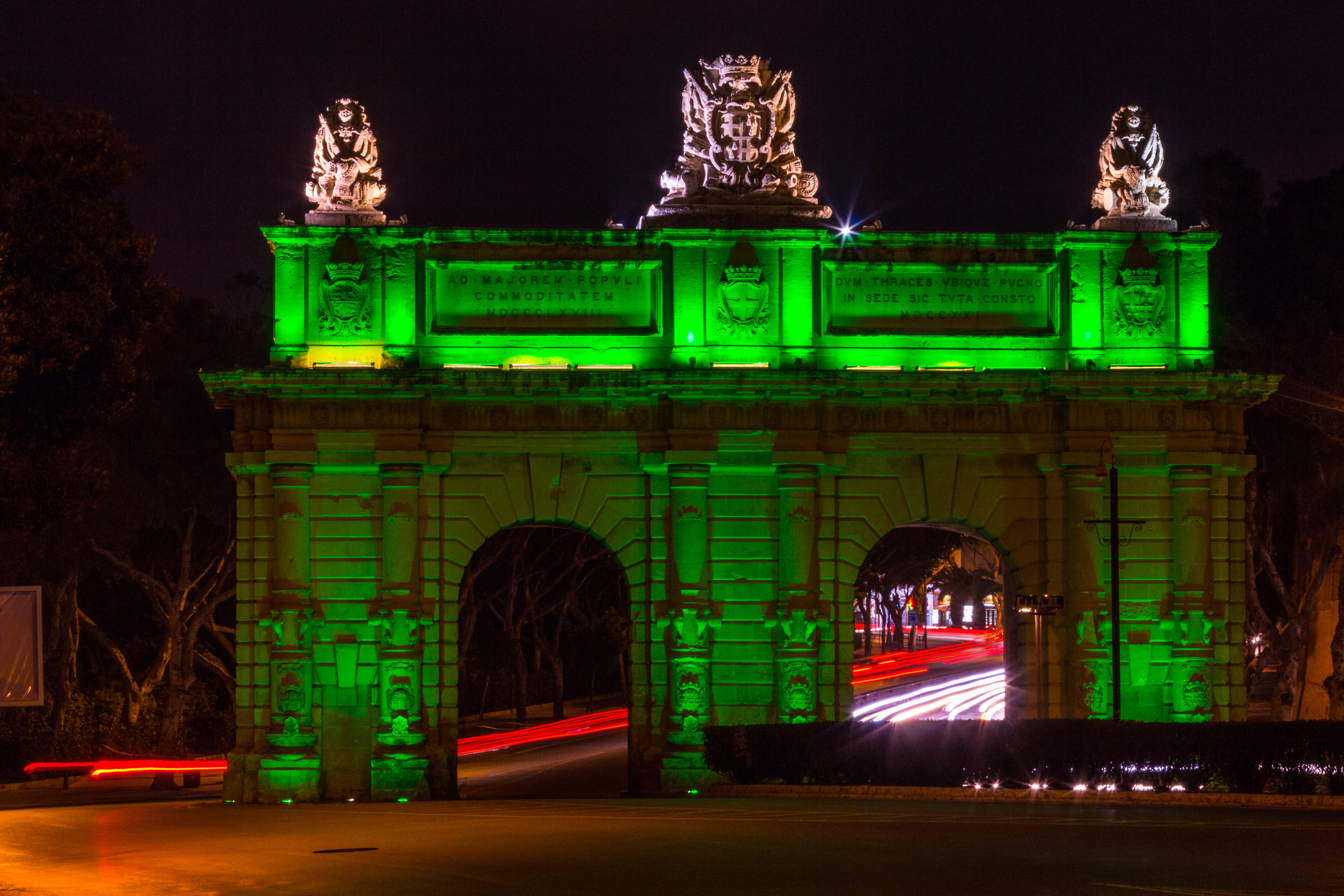
Porte des Bombes illuminated in green on Saint Patrick's Day of 2014

The first Saint Patrick's Day celebrations in Malta took place in the early 20th century by soldiers of the Royal Dublin Fusiliers who were stationed in Floriana. Celebrations were held in the Balzunetta area of the town, which contained a number of bars and was located close to the barracks. The Irish diaspora in Malta continued to celebrate the feast annually.

Today, Saint Patrick's Day is mainly celebrated in Spinola Bay and Paceville areas of St Julian's, although other celebrations still occur at Floriana and other locations. Thousands of Maltese attend the celebrations, "which are more associated with drinking beer than traditional Irish culture."

==== Russia ====
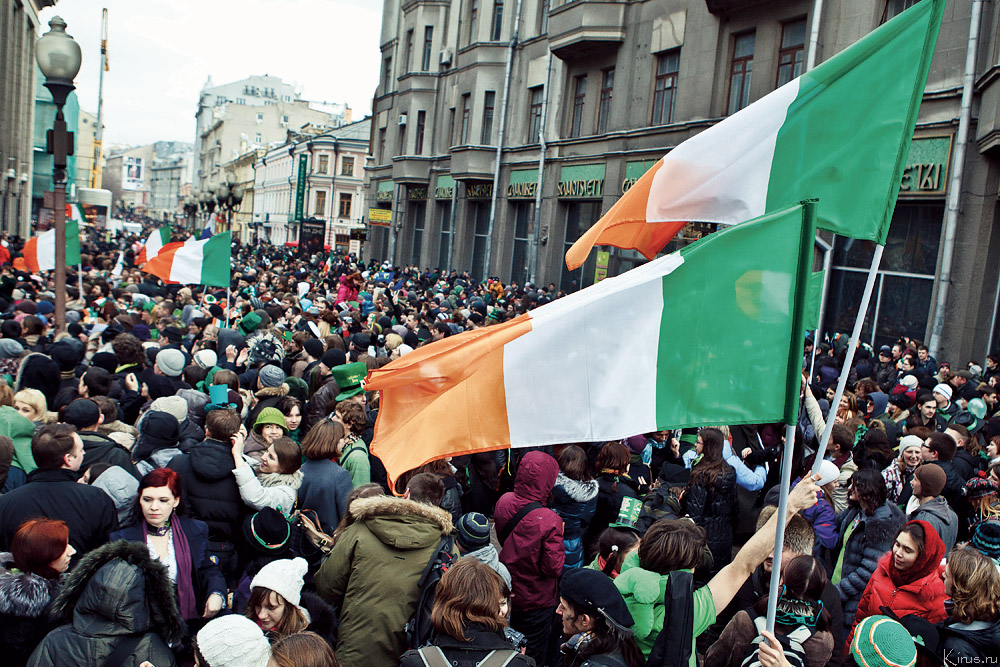
Moscow hosts an annual Saint Patrick's Day festival

The first Saint Patrick's Day parade in Russia took place in 1992. Since 1999, there has been a yearly "Saint Patrick's Day" festival in Moscow and other Russian cities. The official part of the Moscow parade is a military-style parade and is held in collaboration with the Moscow government and the Irish embassy in Moscow. The unofficial parade is held by volunteers and resembles a carnival. In 2014, Moscow Irish Week was celebrated from 12 to 23 March, which includes Saint Patrick's Day on 17 March. Over 70 events celebrating Irish culture in Moscow, St Petersburg, Yekaterinburg, Voronezh, and Volgograd were sponsored by the Irish Embassy, the Moscow City Government, and other organisations.

In 2017, the Russian Orthodox Church added the feast day of Saint Patrick to its liturgical calendar, to be celebrated on 30 March [O.S. 17 March].

==== Spain ====
Madrid, Barcelona, A Coruña and Benidorm are the biggest cities where great celebrations take place in Spain, but some other smaller cities have started to host Saint Patrick's Day in recent years, such as El Espinar, Caldas de Reyes, Pontevedra, Salamanca, Elda, Valladolid and Maspalomas.

==== Other European countries ====
Sarajevo, the capital city of Bosnia and Herzegovina has an Irish expatriate community. The community established the Sarajevo Irish Festival in 2015, which is held for three days around and including Saint Patrick's Day. The festival organizes an annual parade, hosts Irish theatre companies, screens Irish films and organizes concerts of Irish folk musicians. The festival has hosted numerous Irish artists, filmmakers, theatre directors and musicians such as Conor Horgan, Ailis Ni Riain, Dermot Dunne, Mick Moloney, Chloë Agnew and others.

Although it is not a national holiday in Lithuania, the Vilnia River is dyed green every year on the Saint Patrick's Day in the capital Vilnius.

Norway has had a Saint Patrick's Day parade in Oslo since 2000, first organized by Irish expatriates living in Norway, and partially coordinated with the Irish embassy in Oslo.

While Saint Patrick's Day in Switzerland is commonly celebrated on 17 March with festivities similar to those in neighbouring central European countries, it is not unusual for Swiss students to organise celebrations in their own living spaces on Saint Patrick's Eve. Most popular are usually those in Zurich's Kreis 4. Traditionally, guests also contribute with beverages and dress in green.

In Germany since 1996 the city of Munich holds a parade on the weekend before the 17th of March, which has turned into one of the biggest St. Patrck's Day celebrations in continental Europe. In 2026, 30 years after the first parade, around 70 groups comprising together of 1,500 participants marched in the parade and attracted 45,000 spectators.

=== Americas ===
==== Canada ====
Saint Patrick's Day is a government holiday in Newfoundland and Labrador. The island Newfoundland has strong historic and cultural ties to Ireland and is cited as the most Irish place outside of Ireland. Approximately 20% of Newfoundland's population consists of Irish Newfoundlanders.

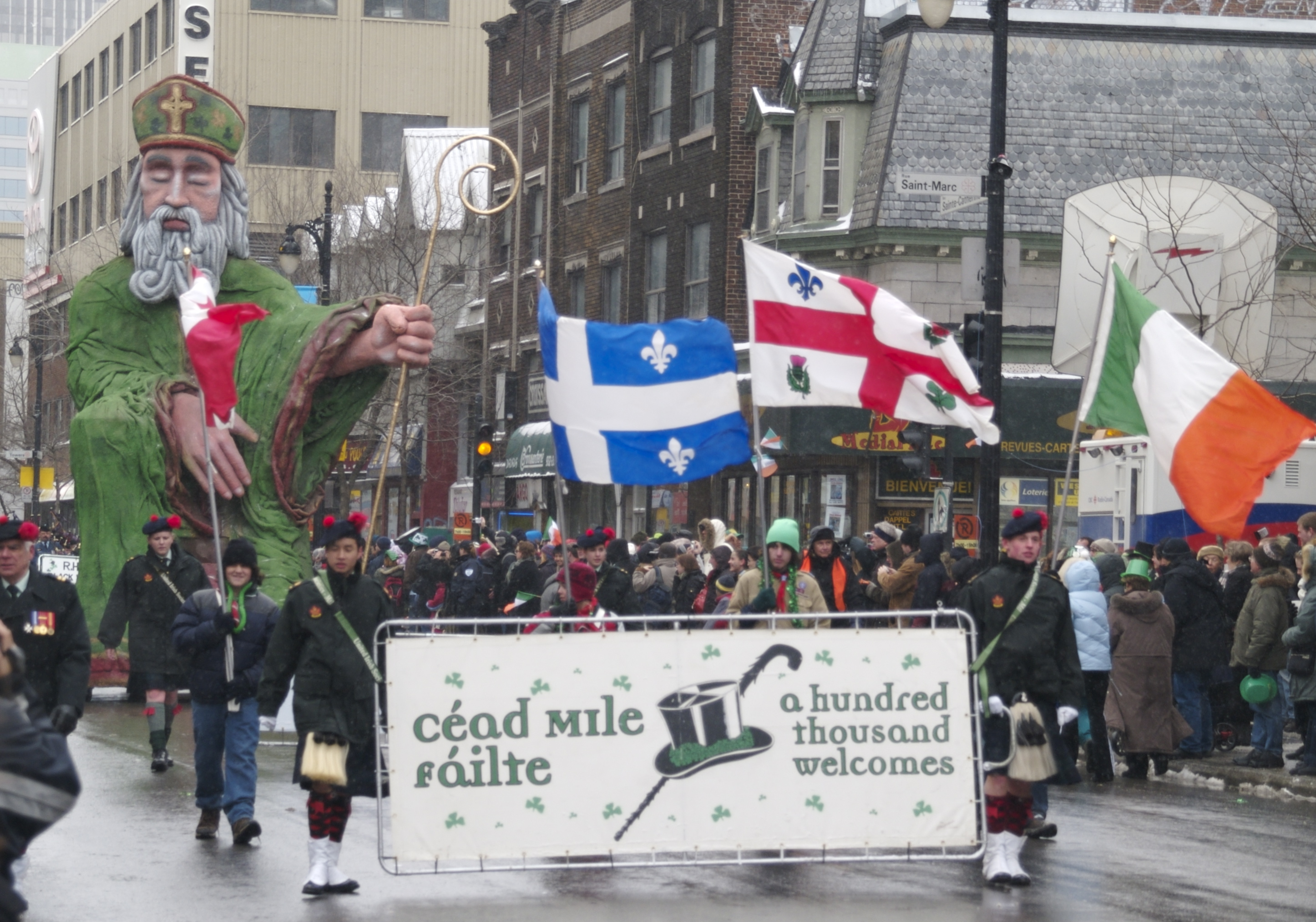
Montreal hosts one of the longest-running and largest Saint Patrick's Day parades in North America

One of the longest-running and largest Saint Patrick's Day (French: le jour de la Saint-Patrick) parades in North America occurs each year in Montreal, whose city flag includes a shamrock in its lower-right quadrant. The yearly celebration has been organised by the United Irish Societies of Montreal since 1929. The parade has been held yearly without interruption since 1824. Saint Patrick's Day itself, however, has been celebrated in Montreal since as far back as 1759 by Irish soldiers in the Montreal Garrison following the British conquest of New France.

In Saint John, New Brunswick Saint Patrick's Day is celebrated as a week-long celebration. Shortly after the JP Collins Celtic Festival is an Irish festival celebrating Saint John's Irish heritage. The festival is named for a young Irish doctor James Patrick Collins who worked on Partridge Island (Saint John County) quarantine station tending to sick Irish immigrants before he died there himself.

In Manitoba, the Irish Association of Manitoba runs a yearly three-day festival of music and culture based around Saint Patrick's Day.

In 2004, the CelticFest Vancouver Society organised its first yearly festival in downtown Vancouver to celebrate the Celtic Nations and their cultures. This event, which includes a parade, occurs each year during the weekend nearest Saint Patrick's Day.

In Quebec City, there was a parade from 1837 to 1926. The Quebec City St-Patrick Parade returned in 2010 after more than 84 years. For the occasion, a portion of the New York Police Department Pipes and Drums were present as special guests.

There has been a parade held in Toronto since at least 1863.

The Toronto Maple Leafs hockey team was known as the Toronto St. Patricks from 1919 to 1927, and wore green jerseys. In 1999, when the Maple Leafs played on Saint Patrick's Day, they wore green St Patrick's retro uniforms.

Some groups, notably Guinness, have lobbied to make Saint Patrick's Day a national holiday.

In March 2009, the Calgary Tower changed its top exterior lights to new green CFL bulbs just in time for Saint Patrick's Day. Part of an environmental non-profit organisation's campaign (Project Porchlight), the green represented environmental concerns. Approximately 210 lights were changed in time for Saint Patrick's Day, and resembled a Leprechaun's hat. After a week, white CFLs took their place. The change was estimated to save the Calgary Tower some $12,000 and reduce greenhouse gas emissions by 104 tonnes.

Since 2019, the City of Waterloo, Ontario has had to contend with an ever-growing massive street party that has coincided with the Saint Patrick's Day celebrations. In 2023, police could be seen putting fences up on Ezra Avenue to discourage partiers to participate in the unauthorized event that has cost the city as much as $750,000 a year for police, paramedics, and municipal services.

==== United States ====
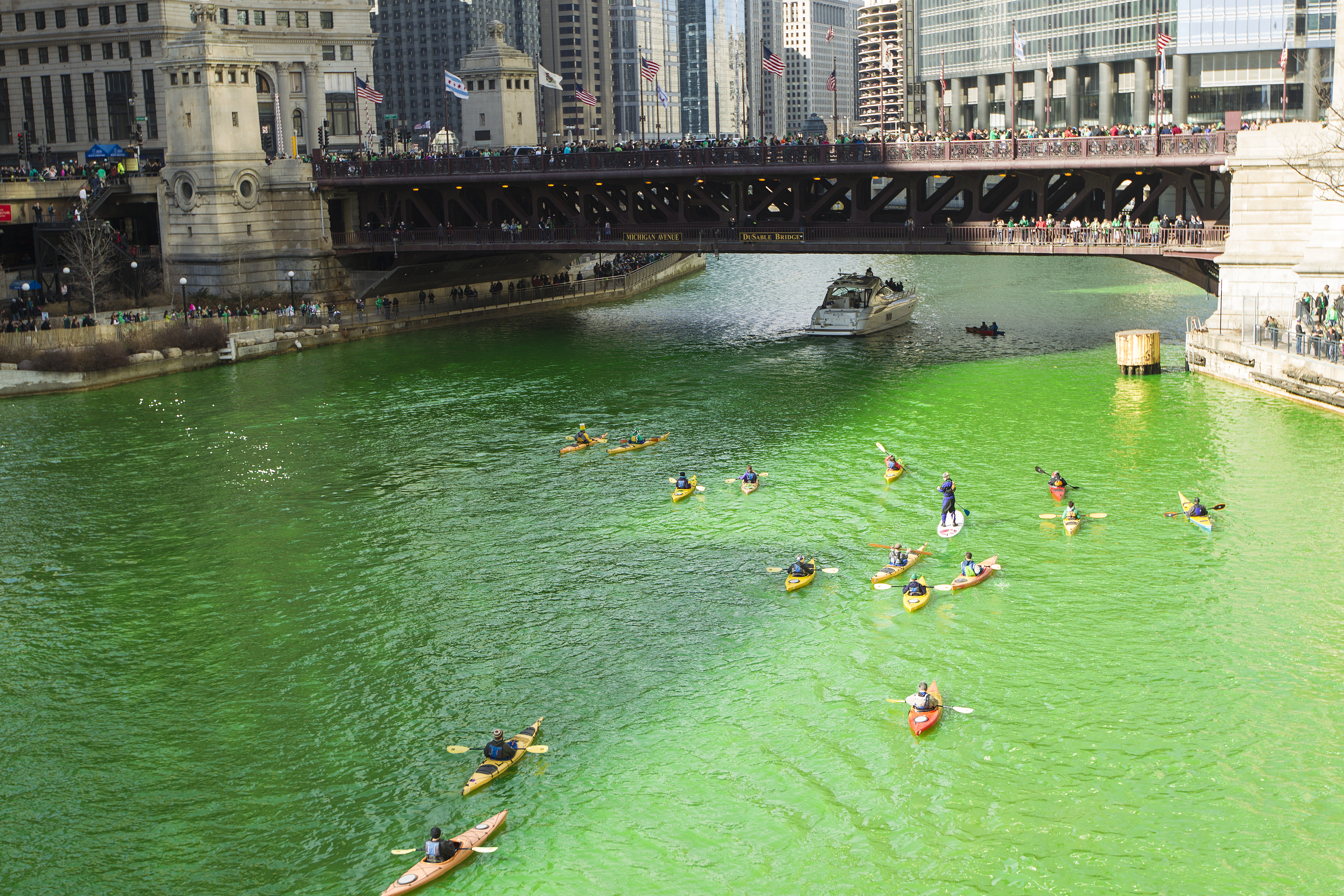
The Chicago River dyed green

Saint Patrick's Day, while not a legal holiday in the United States, is nonetheless widely recognised and observed throughout the country as a celebration of Irish and Irish-American culture. Celebrations include prominent displays of the colour green, religious observances, numerous parades, and copious consumption of alcohol. The holiday has been celebrated in what is now the U.S. since 1600, with the first parade occurring in 1601.

It is customary for the Irish Taoiseach (Irish Prime Minister) to meet with the President of the United States on or around Saint Patrick's Day. Traditionally, the Taoiseach presents the US president a Waterford Crystal bowl filled with shamrocks. This tradition began in 1952 when the Irish Ambassador to the US, John Hearne, sent a box of shamrocks to President Harry S. Truman. From then, it became a yearly custom for the Irish ambassador to send Saint Patrick's Day shamrocks to an official in the US President's administration, although on some occasions the shamrocks were given personally by the Irish Taoiseach or Irish President to the US president in Washington. After the meeting between Taoiseach Albert Reynolds and President Bill Clinton in 1994, the presenting of the shamrocks became a yearly custom.

==== Mexico ====
The Saint Patrick's Battalion is honored in Mexico on Saint Patrick's Day.

==== Argentina ====
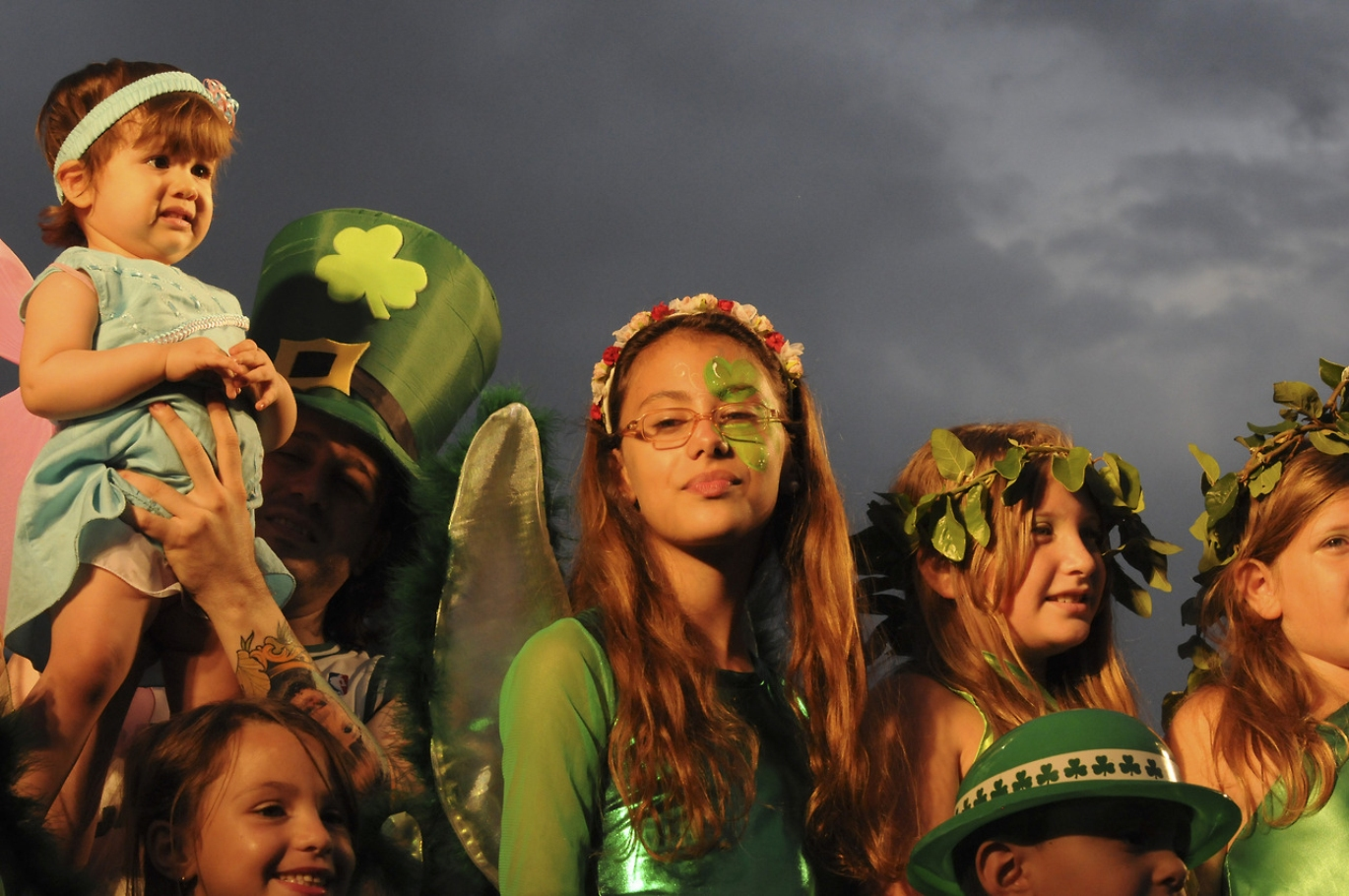
Celebrations in Buenos Aires centre on Reconquista street

In Buenos Aires, a party is held in the downtown street of Reconquista, where there are several Irish pubs; in 2006, there were 50,000 people in this street and the pubs nearby. Neither the Catholic Church nor the Irish community, the fifth largest in the world outside Ireland, take part in the organisation of the parties.

==== Montserrat ====
The island of Montserrat is known as the "Emerald Island of the Caribbean" because of its founding by Irish refugees from Saint Kitts and Nevis. Montserrat is one of three places where Saint Patrick's Day is a public holiday, along with Ireland and the Canadian province of Newfoundland and Labrador. The holiday in Montserrat also commemorates a failed slave uprising that occurred on 17 March 1768.

=== Oceania ===
==== Australia ====
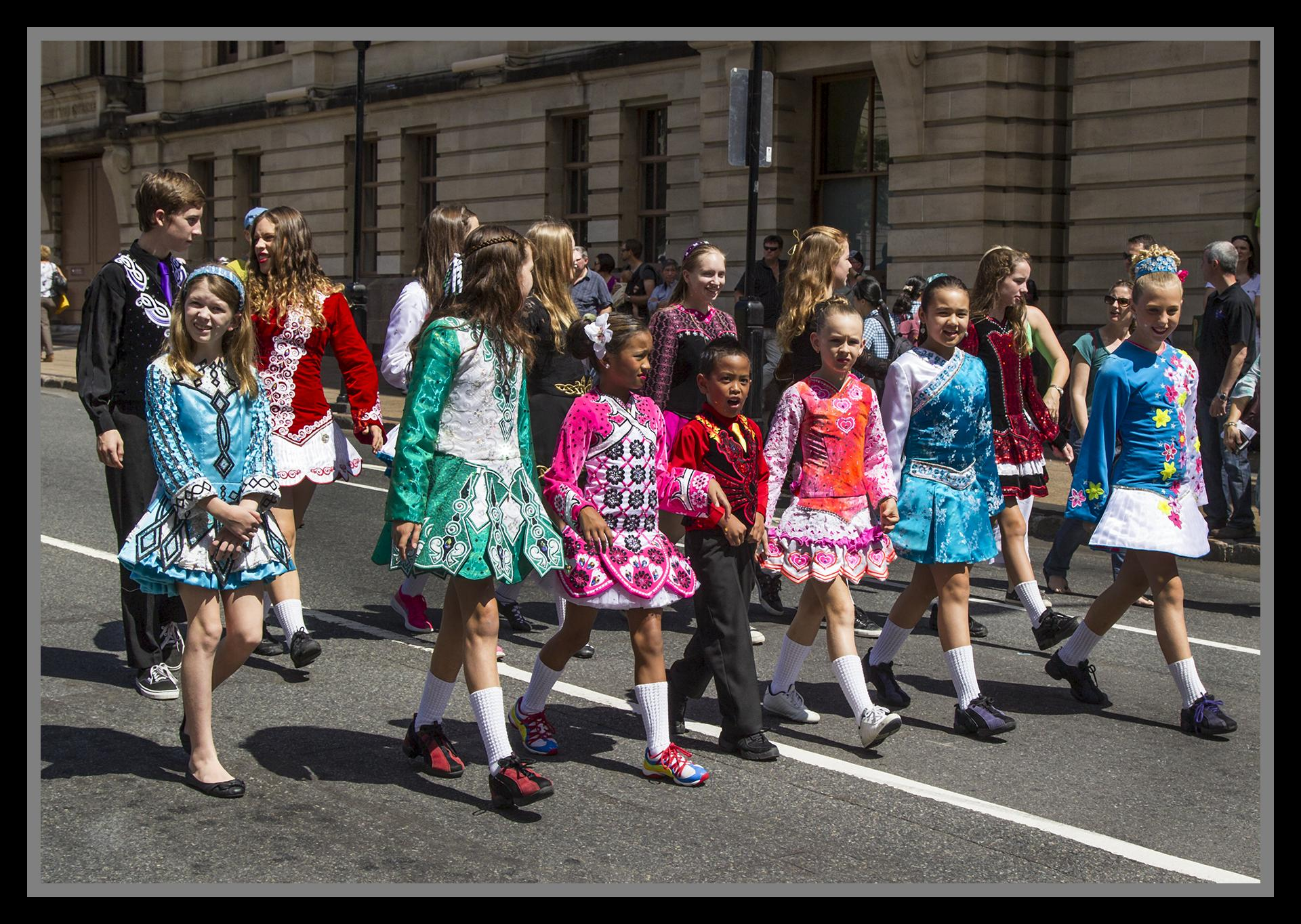
Saint Patrick's Parade in Brisbane

Saint Patrick's Day is not a public holiday in Australia, although it is celebrated each year across the country's states and territories. Festivals and parades are often held on weekends around 17 March in cities such as Sydney, Brisbane, Adelaide, and Melbourne. On occasion, festivals and parades are cancelled. For instance, Melbourne's 2006 and 2007 Saint Patrick's Day festivals and parades were cancelled due to sporting events (Commonwealth Games and Australian Grand Prix) being booked on and around the planned Saint Patrick's Day festivals and parades in the city. In Sydney the parade and family day was cancelled in 2016 due to financial problems. However, Brisbane's Saint Patrick's Day parade, which was cancelled at the outbreak of World War II and wasn't revived until 1990, was not called off in 2020 as precaution for the COVID-19 pandemic, in contrast to many other Saint Patrick's Day parades around the world.

The first mention of Saint Patrick's Day being celebrated in Australia was in 1795, when Irish convicts and administrators, Catholic and Protestant, in the penal colony came together to celebrate the day as a national holiday, despite a ban against assemblies being in place at the time. This unified day of Irish nationalist observance would soon dissipate over time, with celebrations on Saint Patrick's Day becoming divisive between religions and social classes, representative more of Australianness than of Irishness and held intermittingly throughout the years. Historian Patrick O'Farrell credits the 1916 Easter Rising in Dublin and Archbishop Daniel Mannix of Melbourne for re-igniting St Patrick's Day celebrations in Australia and reviving the sense of Irishness amongst those with Irish heritage. The organisers of the Saint Patrick's festivities in the past were, more often than not, the Catholic clergy which often courted controversy. Bishop Patrick Phelan of Sale described in 1921 how the authorities in Victoria had ordered that a Union Jack be flown at the front of the Saint Patrick's Day parade and following the refusal by Irishmen and Irish-Australians to do so, the authorities paid for an individual to carry the flag at the head of the parade. This individual was later assaulted by two men who were later fined in court.

==== New Zealand ====
From 1878 to 1955, Saint Patrick's Day was recognised as a public holiday in New Zealand, together with St George's Day (England) and St Andrew's Day (Scotland). Auckland attracted many Irish migrants in the 1850s and 1860s, and it was here where some of the earliest Saint Patrick's Day celebrations took place, which often entailed the hosting of community picnics. However, this rapidly evolved from the late 1860s onwards to include holding parades with pipe bands and marching children wearing green, sporting events, concerts, balls and other social events, where people displayed their Irishness with pride. While Saint Patrick's Day is no longer recognised as a public holiday, it continues to be celebrated across New Zealand with festivals and parades at weekends on or around 17 March.

In the university city of Dunedin, Saint Patrick's Day (commonly referred to as "St Paddy's") is widely regarded as one of the largest social events of the year. Among the student population, the day is associated with informal drinking traditions such as "six before six" (consuming six alcoholic drinks before 6:00 am), "wine before nine" (consuming a bottle of wine before 9:00 am), and "goon before noon" (consuming a cask of wine before 12:00 pm).

=== Asia ===
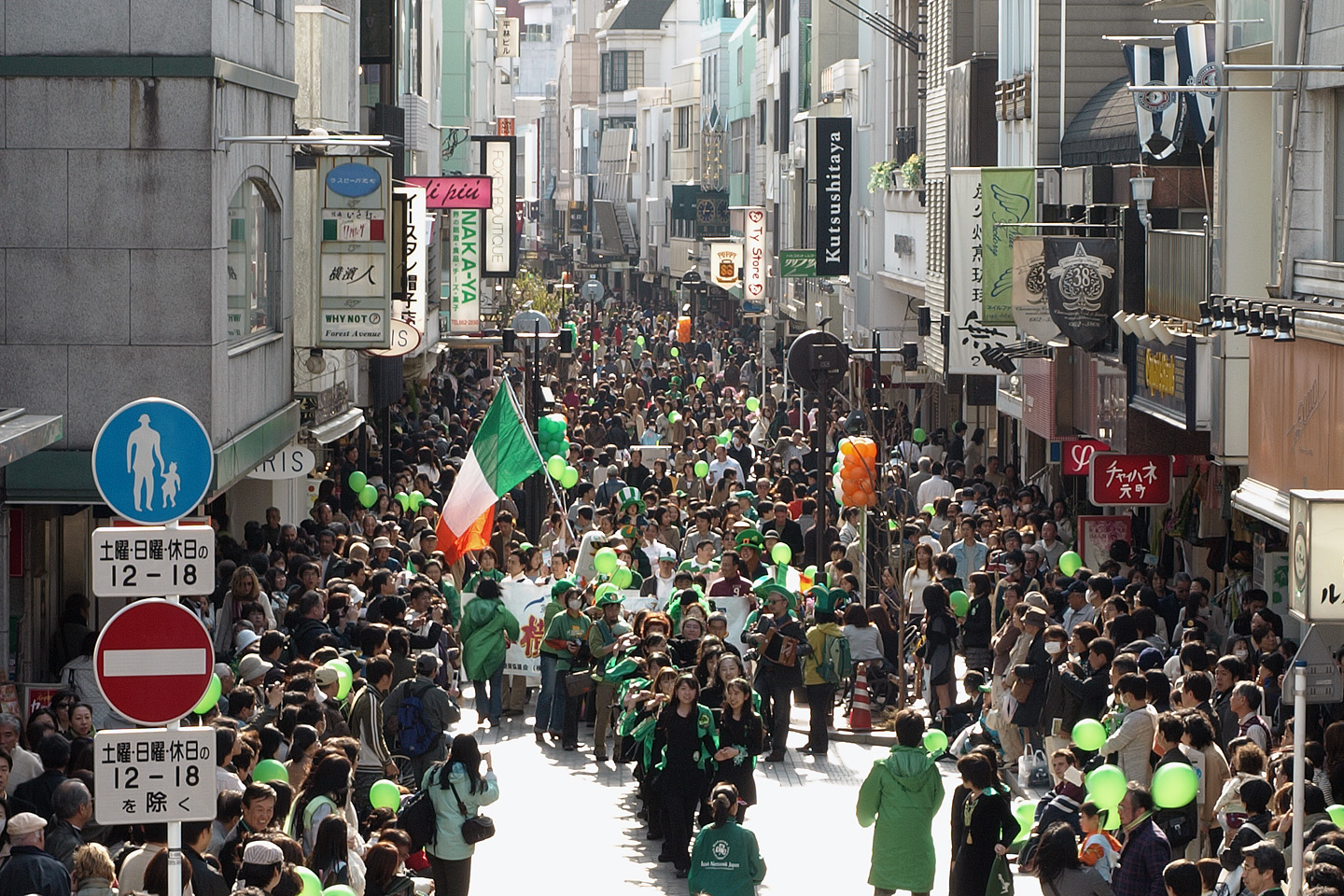
Saint Patrick's Day in Motomachi, Yokohama

Saint Patrick's parades are now held in many locations across Japan. The first parade, in Tokyo, was organised by The Irish Network Japan (INJ) in 1992.

The Irish Association of Korea has celebrated Saint Patrick's Day since 1976 in Seoul, the capital city of Korea and Busan, second largest city in Korea. The plaxe of the parade and festivals are Itaewon of Seoul and Seomyeon of Busan. It is sponsored by Embassy of Ireland in Korea.

In Malaysia, the St Patrick's Society of Selangor, founded in 1925, organises a yearly St Patrick's Ball, described as the biggest Saint Patrick's Day celebration in Asia. Guinness Anchor Berhad also organises 36 parties across the country in places like the Klang Valley, Penang, Johor Bahru, Malacca, Ipoh, Kuantan, Kota Kinabalu, Miri and Kuching.

=== UN Peacekeeping missions ===
Irish United Nations (UN) peacekeepers outside Ireland also celebrate Saint Patrick's Day. For example, in 2021, the United Nations Disengagement Observer Force's Irish contingent led a parade in Syria where members received shamrocks and 35 personnel were presented with the UN Peacekeeping Medal.

=== International Space Station ===
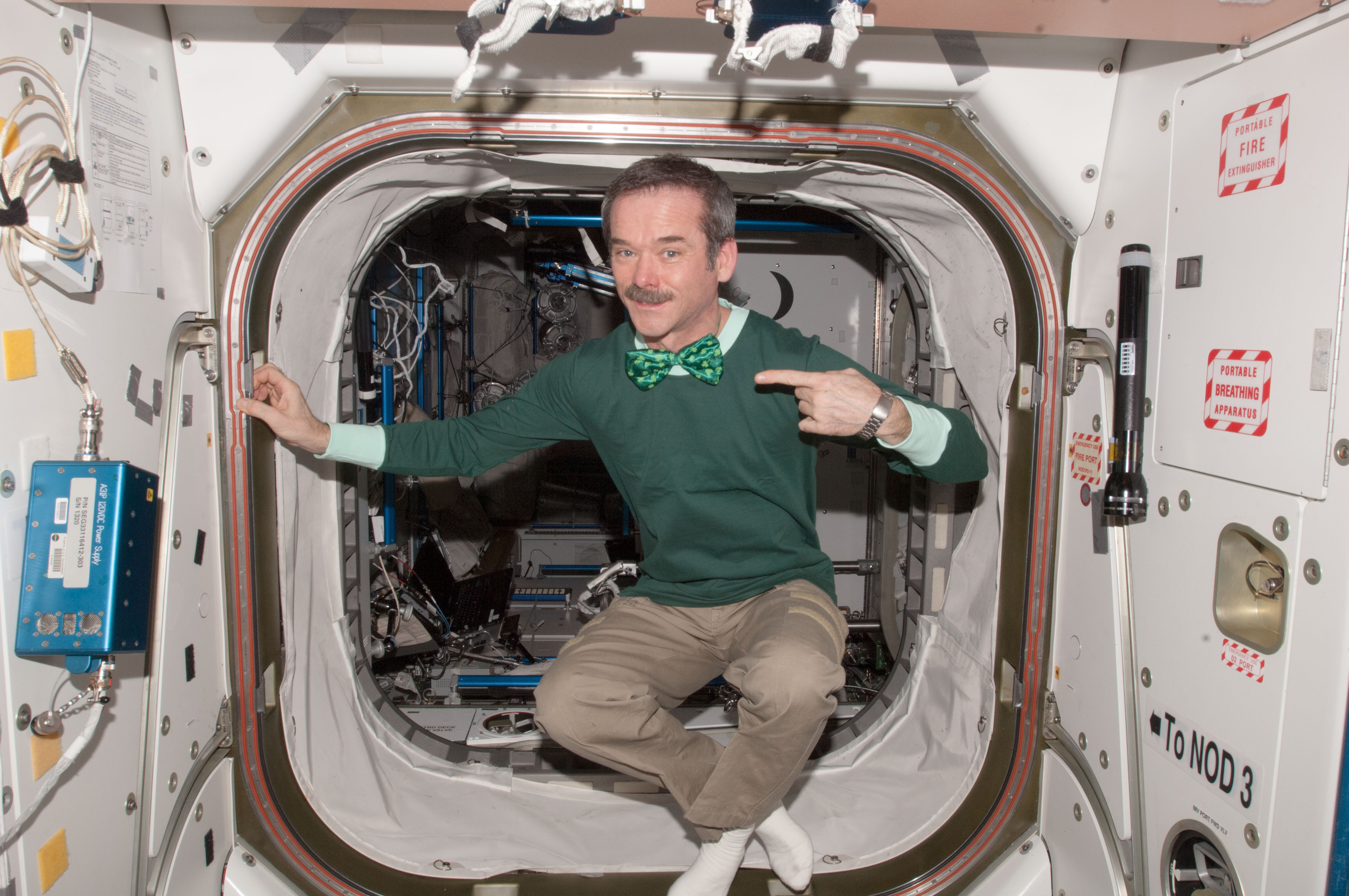
Astronaut Chris Hadfield wearing green in the International Space Station on Saint Patrick's Day, 2013

Astronauts on board the International Space Station have celebrated the festival in different ways. Irish-American Catherine Coleman played a hundred-year-old flute belonging to Matt Molloy and a tin whistle belonging to Paddy Moloney, both members of the Irish music group The Chieftains, while floating weightless in the space station on Saint Patrick's Day in 2011. Her performance was later included in a track called "The Chieftains in Orbit" on the group's 2012 album, Voice of Ages.

Chris Hadfield took photographs of Ireland from Earth orbit, and a picture of himself wearing green clothing in the space station, and posted them online on Saint Patrick's Day in 2013. He also posted online a recording of himself singing "Danny Boy" in space.

== Criticism ==
Saint Patrick's Day celebrations have been criticised, particularly for their association with public drunkenness and disorderly conduct. Some argue that the festivities have become too commercialised and tacky, and have strayed from their original purpose of honouring Saint Patrick and Irish heritage. Irish American journalist Niall O'Dowd has criticised attempts to recast Saint Patrick's Day as a celebration of multiculturalism rather than a celebration of Irishness.

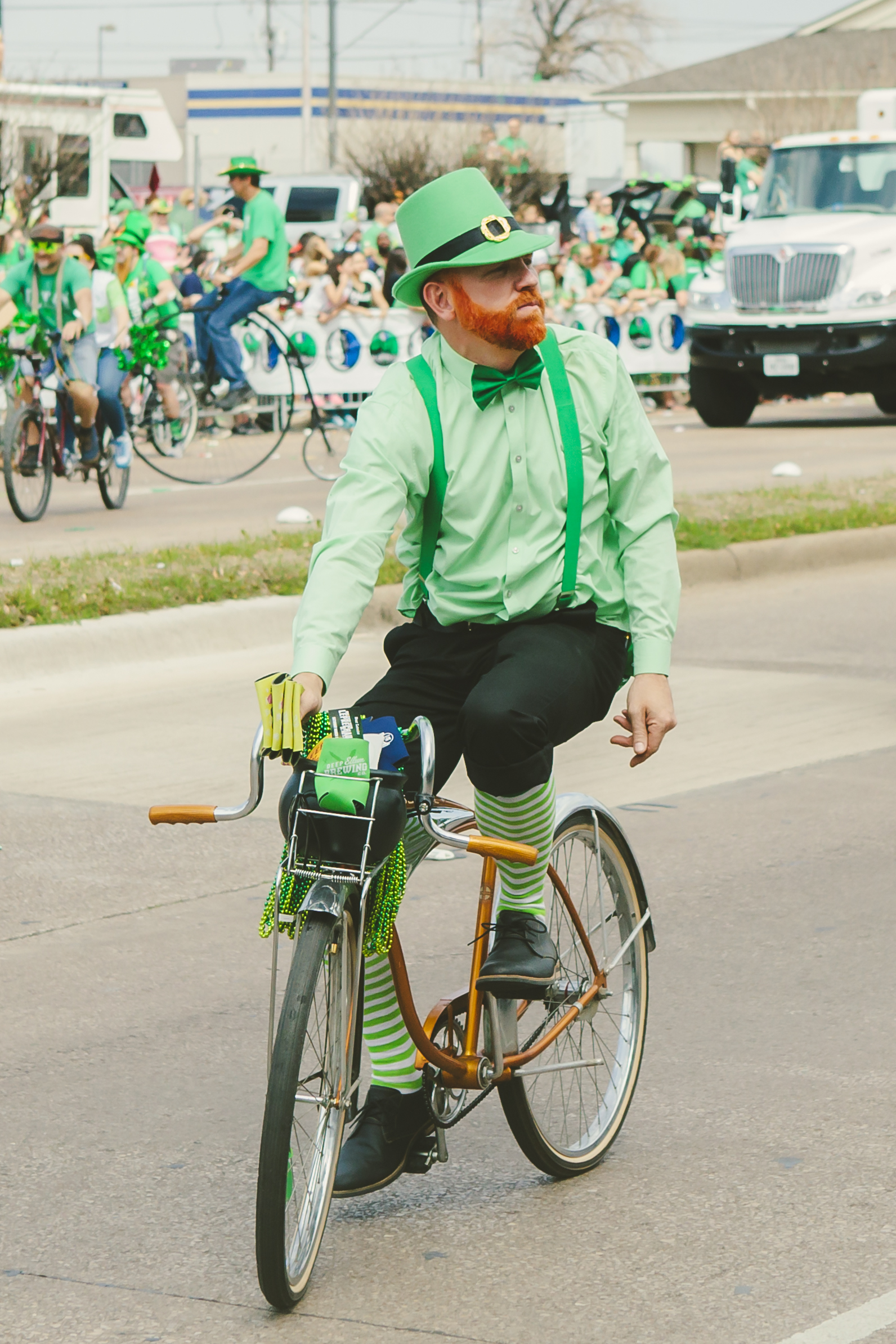
Man in a leprechaun outfit on Saint Patrick's Day

Saint Patrick's Day celebrations have also been criticised for fostering demeaning stereotypes of Ireland and Irish people. An example is the wearing of 'leprechaun outfits', which are based on derogatory 19th century caricatures of the Irish. In the run up to Saint Patrick's Day 2014, the Ancient Order of Hibernians successfully campaigned to stop major American retailers from selling novelty merchandise that promoted negative Irish stereotypes.

Saint Patrick's Day celebrations outside Ireland have been described by critics as displays of "Plastic Paddyness"; where foreigners appropriate and misrepresent Irish culture, claim Irish identity, and enact Irish stereotypes.

LGBTQ groups in the US were long banned from marching in Saint Patrick's Day parades in New York City and Boston. In 1995, the Supreme Court's landmark decision in Hurley v. Irish-American Gay, Lesbian, and Bisexual Group of Boston affirmed event organizers' rights to determine the messages that their events conveyed, effectively permitting the exclusion of LGBTQ groups. The bans on LGBTQ group participation in New York City and Boston were lifted in 2014 and 2015, respectively. However, LGBTQ groups still experience barriers to participation and have organized alternative, inclusive events such as St. Pat's for All in Queens.

== Sports events ==
- Traditionally the finals of the All-Ireland Senior Club Football Championship and All-Ireland Senior Club Hurling Championship were held on Saint Patrick's Day in Croke Park, Dublin, but since 2020 these now take place in January. The Interprovincial Championship was previously held on 17 March but this was switched to games being played in Autumn.
- The Leinster Schools Rugby Senior Cup, Munster Schools Rugby Senior Cup and Ulster Schools Senior Cup finals are held on Saint Patrick's Day. The Connacht Schools Rugby Senior Cup final is held on the weekend before Saint Patrick's Day.
- Horse racing at the Cheltenham Festival attracts large numbers of Irish people, both residents of Britain and many who travel from Ireland, and usually coincides with Saint Patrick's Day.
- The Six Nations Championship is an annual international rugby Union tournament competed by England, France, Ireland, Italy, Scotland, and Wales and reaches its climax on or around Saint Patrick's Day. On St Patrick's Day 2018, Ireland defeated England 24–15 at Twickenham, London to claim the third Grand Slam in their history.
- The Saint Patrick's Day Test is an international rugby league tournament that is played between the US and Ireland. The competition was first started in 1995 and continued in 1996, 2000, 2002, 2003, 2004, 2011, and 2012. Ireland won the first two tests as well as the one in 2011, with the US winning the remaining 5. The game is usually held on or around 17 March to coincide with Saint Patrick's Day.
- The major professional sports leagues of the United States and Canada that play during March often wear special third jerseys to acknowledge the holiday. Examples include the Buffalo Sabres (who have worn special Irish-themed practice jerseys), Toronto Maple Leafs (who wear Toronto St. Patricks throwbacks), New York Knicks, Toronto Raptors, and most Major League Baseball teams. The New Jersey Devils have worn their green-and-red throwback jerseys on or around Saint Patrick's Day in recent years.

== See also ==
- Gaelic calendar, also known as Irish calendar
- "It's a Great Day for the Irish"
- Order of St. Patrick
- Saint Patrick's Breastplate
- St. Patrick's Day Snowstorm of 1892
- Saint Brigid of Ireland
- Saint Urho
- Unofficial Saint Patrick's Day
- Saint Andrew's Day
- Saint David's Day
- Saint George's Day
